= List of Lepidoptera of Albania =

Location of Albania

Lepidoptera of Albania consist of both the butterflies and moths recorded from Albania.

== Butterflies ==
=== Hesperiidae ===
- Carcharodus alceae (Esper, 1780)
- Carcharodus floccifera (Zeller, 1847)
- Carcharodus lavatherae (Esper, 1783)
- Carcharodus orientalis Reverdin, 1913
- Erynnis marloyi (Boisduval, 1834)
- Erynnis tages (Linnaeus, 1758)
- Gegenes nostrodamus (Fabricius, 1793)
- Gegenes pumilio (Hoffmannsegg, 1804)
- Hesperia comma (Linnaeus, 1758)
- Ochlodes sylvanus (Esper, 1777)
- Pyrgus alveus (Hübner, 1803)
- Pyrgus armoricanus (Oberthür, 1910)
- Pyrgus carthami (Hübner, 1813)
- Pyrgus cinarae (Rambur, 1839)
- Pyrgus malvae (Linnaeus, 1758)
- Pyrgus serratulae (Rambur, 1839)
- Pyrgus sidae (Esper, 1784)
- Spialia orbifer (Hübner, 1823)
- Spialia phlomidis (Herrich-Schäffer, 1845)
- Thymelicus acteon (Rottemburg, 1775)
- Thymelicus lineola (Ochsenheimer, 1808)
- Thymelicus sylvestris (Poda, 1761)

=== Lycaenidae ===
- Aricia agestis (Denis & Schiffermüller, 1775)
- Aricia anteros (Freyer, 1838)
- Aricia artaxerxes (Fabricius, 1793)
- Callophrys rubi (Linnaeus, 1758)
- Celastrina argiolus (Linnaeus, 1758)
- Cupido alcetas (Hoffmannsegg, 1804)
- Cupido argiades (Pallas, 1771)
- Cupido decolorata (Staudinger, 1886)
- Cupido minimus (Fuessly, 1775)
- Cupido osiris (Meigen, 1829)
- Cyaniris semiargus (Rottemburg, 1775)
- Eumedonia eumedon (Esper, 1780)
- Favonius quercus (Linnaeus, 1758)
- Glaucopsyche alexis (Poda, 1761)
- Iolana iolas (Ochsenheimer, 1816)
- Kretania sephirus (Frivaldszky, 1835)
- Lampides boeticus (Linnaeus, 1767)
- Leptotes pirithous (Linnaeus, 1767)
- Lycaena alciphron (Rottemburg, 1775)
- Lycaena candens (Herrich-Schäffer, 1844)
- Lycaena ottomanus (Lefebvre, 1830)
- Lycaena phlaeas (Linnaeus, 1761)
- Lycaena tityrus (Poda, 1761)
- Lycaena virgaureae (Linnaeus, 1758)
- Lysandra bellargus (Rottemburg, 1775)
- Lysandra coridon (Poda, 1761)
- Phengaris alcon (Denis & Schiffermüller, 1775)
- Phengaris arion (Linnaeus, 1758)
- Plebejus argus (Linnaeus, 1758)
- Plebejus argyrognomon (Bergsträsser, 1779)
- Polyommatus amandus (Schneider, 1792)
- Polyommatus damon (Denis & Schiffermüller, 1775)
- Polyommatus daphnis (Denis & Schiffermüller, 1775)
- Polyommatus dorylas (Denis & Schiffermüller, 1775)
- Polyommatus eros (Ochsenheimer, 1808)
- Polyommatus icarus (Rottemburg, 1775)
- Polyommatus ripartii (Freyer, 1830)
- Pseudophilotes vicrama (Moore, 1865)
- Satyrium acaciae (Fabricius, 1787)
- Satyrium ilicis (Esper, 1779)
- Satyrium spini (Denis & Schiffermüller, 1775)
- Satyrium w-album (Knoch, 1782)
- Scolitantides orion (Pallas, 1771)
- Tarucus balkanica (Freyer, 1844)
- Thecla betulae (Linnaeus, 1758)

=== Nymphalidae ===
- Aglais io (Linnaeus, 1758)
- Aglais urticae (Linnaeus, 1758)
- Apatura ilia (Denis & Schiffermüller, 1775)
- Apatura metis Freyer, 1829
- Aphantopus hyperantus (Linnaeus, 1758)
- Arethusana arethusa (Denis & Schiffermüller, 1775)
- Argynnis pandora (Denis & Schiffermüller, 1775)
- Boloria graeca (Staudinger, 1870)
- Boloria pales (Denis & Schiffermüller, 1775)
- Boloria dia (Linnaeus, 1767)
- Boloria euphrosyne (Linnaeus, 1758)
- Boloria titania (Esper, 1793)
- Brenthis daphne (Bergsträsser, 1780)
- Brenthis hecate (Denis & Schiffermüller, 1775)
- Brenthis ino (Rottemburg, 1775)
- Brintesia circe (Fabricius, 1775)
- Charaxes jasius (Linnaeus, 1767)
- Chazara briseis (Linnaeus, 1764)
- Coenonympha arcania (Linnaeus, 1761)
- Coenonympha leander (Esper, 1784)
- Coenonympha orientalis Rebel, 1910
- Coenonympha pamphilus (Linnaeus, 1758)
- Coenonympha tullia (Müller, 1764)
- Erebia aethiops (Esper, 1777)
- Erebia epiphron (Knoch, 1783)
- Erebia euryale (Esper, 1805)
- Erebia gorge (Hübner, 1804)
- Erebia ligea (Linnaeus, 1758)
- Erebia medusa (Denis & Schiffermüller, 1775)
- Erebia melas (Herbst, 1796)
- Erebia oeme (Hübner, 1804)
- Erebia pandrose (Borkhausen, 1788)
- Erebia pronoe (Esper, 1780)
- Erebia rhodopensis Nicholl, 1900
- Erebia triarius (de Prunner, 1798)
- Erebia tyndarus (Esper, 1781)
- Euphydryas aurinia (Rottemburg, 1775)
- Fabriciana adippe (Denis & Schiffermüller, 1775)
- Fabriciana niobe (Linnaeus, 1758)
- Hipparchia fagi (Scopoli, 1763)
- Hipparchia syriaca (Staudinger, 1871)
- Hipparchia statilinus (Hufnagel, 1766)
- Hipparchia semele (Linnaeus, 1758)
- Hyponephele lupinus (O. Costa, 1836)
- Hyponephele lycaon (Rottemburg, 1775)
- Issoria lathonia (Linnaeus, 1758)
- Kirinia climene (Esper, 1783)
- Kirinia roxelana (Cramer, 1777)
- Lasiommata maera (Linnaeus, 1758)
- Lasiommata megera (Linnaeus, 1767)
- Libythea celtis (Laicharting, 1782)
- Maniola jurtina (Linnaeus, 1758)
- Melanargia galathea (Linnaeus, 1758)
- Melanargia larissa (Geyer, 1828)
- Melanargia russiae (Esper, 1783)
- Melitaea athalia (Rottemburg, 1775)
- Melitaea cinxia (Linnaeus, 1758)
- Melitaea didyma (Esper, 1778)
- Melitaea ornata Christoph, 1893
- Melitaea phoebe (Denis & Schiffermüller, 1775)
- Melitaea trivia (Denis & Schiffermüller, 1775)
- Minois dryas (Scopoli, 1763)
- Neptis rivularis (Scopoli, 1763)
- Nymphalis antiopa (Linnaeus, 1758)
- Nymphalis polychloros (Linnaeus, 1758)
- Nymphalis xanthomelas (Esper, 1781)
- Pararge aegeria (Linnaeus, 1758)
- Polygonia c-album (Linnaeus, 1758)
- Polygonia egea (Cramer, 1775)
- Pseudochazara anthelea (Hübner, 1824)
- Pseudochazara geyeri (Herrich-Schäffer, 1846)
- Pyronia cecilia (Vallantin, 1894)
- Pyronia tithonus (Linnaeus, 1767)
- Satyrus ferula (Fabricius, 1793)
- Speyeria aglaja (Linnaeus, 1758)
- Vanessa atalanta (Linnaeus, 1758)
- Vanessa cardui (Linnaeus, 1758)

=== Papilionidae ===
- Iphiclides podalirius (Linnaeus, 1758)
- Papilio alexanor Esper, 1800
- Papilio machaon Linnaeus, 1758
- Parnassius apollo (Linnaeus, 1758)
- Parnassius mnemosyne (Linnaeus, 1758)
- Zerynthia cerisy (Godart, 1824)
- Zerynthia polyxena (Denis & Schiffermüller, 1775)

=== Pieridae ===
- Anthocharis cardamines (Linnaeus, 1758)
- Anthocharis gruneri Herrich-Schäffer, 1851
- Aporia crataegi (Linnaeus, 1758)
- Colias croceus (Fourcroy, 1785)
- Colias hyale (Linnaeus, 1758)
- Euchloe ausonia (Hübner, 1804)
- Gonepteryx cleopatra (Linnaeus, 1767)
- Gonepteryx farinosa (Zeller, 1847)
- Gonepteryx rhamni (Linnaeus, 1758)
- Leptidea duponcheli (Staudinger, 1871)
- Leptidea sinapis (Linnaeus, 1758)
- Pieris brassicae (Linnaeus, 1758)
- Pieris ergane (Geyer, 1828)
- Pieris krueperi Staudinger, 1860
- Pieris mannii (Mayer, 1851)
- Pieris napi (Linnaeus, 1758)
- Pieris rapae (Linnaeus, 1758)
- Pontia chloridice (Hübner, 1813)
- Pontia edusa (Fabricius, 1777)

=== Riodinidae ===
- Hamearis lucina (Linnaeus, 1758)

== Moths ==
=== Adelidae ===
- Adela australis (Heydenreich, 1851)
- Adela croesella (Scopoli, 1763)
- Adela homalella Staudinger, 1859
- Adela reaumurella (Linnaeus, 1758)
- Adela violella (Denis & Schiffermüller, 1775)
- Cauchas fibulella (Denis & Schiffermüller, 1775)
- Cauchas leucocerella (Scopoli, 1763)
- Cauchas rufifrontella (Treitschke, 1833)
- Cauchas rufimitrella (Scopoli, 1763)
- Nematopogon adansoniella (Villers, 1789)
- Nematopogon pilella (Denis & Schiffermüller, 1775)
- Nematopogon robertella (Clerck, 1759)
- Nematopogon schwarziellus Zeller, 1839
- Nematopogon swammerdamella (Linnaeus, 1758)
- Nemophora associatella (Zeller, 1839)
- Nemophora barbatellus (Zeller, 1847)
- Nemophora congruella (Zeller, 1839)
- Nemophora cupriacella (Hübner, 1819)
- Nemophora degeerella (Linnaeus, 1758)
- Nemophora dumerilella (Duponchel, 1839)
- Nemophora fasciella (Fabricius, 1775)
- Nemophora metallica (Poda, 1761)
- Nemophora minimella (Denis & Schiffermüller, 1775)
- Nemophora prodigellus (Zeller, 1853)
- Nemophora raddaella (Hübner, 1793)
- Nemophora violellus (Herrich-Schäffer in Stainton, 1851)

=== Alucitidae ===
- Alucita cymatodactyla Zeller, 1852
- Alucita grammodactyla Zeller, 1841

=== Argyresthiidae ===
- Argyresthia pruniella (Clerck, 1759)

=== Autostichidae ===
- Apatema apolausticum Gozmany, 1996
- Apatema mediopallidum Walsingham, 1900
- Aprominta designatella (Herrich-Schäffer, 1855)
- Donaspastus pannonicus Gozmany, 1952
- Dysspastus undecimpunctella (Mann, 1864)
- Holcopogon bubulcellus (Staudinger, 1859)
- Nukusa cinerella (Rebel, 1941)
- Nukusa praeditella (Rebel, 1891)

=== Blastobasidae ===
- Blastobasis phycidella (Zeller, 1839)

=== Brachodidae ===
- Brachodes nana (Treitschke, 1834)
- Brachodes pumila (Ochsenheimer, 1808)

=== Brahmaeidae ===
- Lemonia balcanica (Herrich-Schäffer, 1847)
- Lemonia taraxaci (Denis & Schiffermüller, 1775)

=== Bucculatricidae ===
- Bucculatrix bechsteinella (Bechstein & Scharfenberg, 1805)

=== Chimabachidae ===
- Diurnea fagella (Denis & Schiffermüller, 1775)
- Diurnea lipsiella (Denis & Schiffermüller, 1775)

=== Choreutidae ===
- Anthophila fabriciana (Linnaeus, 1767)
- Choreutis nemorana (Hübner, 1799)
- Prochoreutis myllerana (Fabricius, 1794)
- Prochoreutis stellaris (Zeller, 1847)
- Tebenna micalis (Mann, 1857)

=== Coleophoridae ===
- Coleophora albicostella (Duponchel, 1842)
- Coleophora albitarsella Zeller, 1849
- Coleophora alcyonipennella (Kollar, 1832)
- Coleophora anatipenella (Hübner, 1796)
- Coleophora argentula (Stephens, 1834)
- Coleophora calycotomella Stainton, 1869
- Coleophora chamaedriella Bruand, 1852
- Coleophora coarctataephaga Toll, 1961
- Coleophora conyzae Zeller, 1868
- Coleophora deauratella Lienig & Zeller, 1846
- Coleophora follicularis (Vallot, 1802)
- Coleophora fuscocuprella Herrich-Schäffer, 1855
- Coleophora glaucicolella Wood, 1892
- Coleophora gryphipennella (Hübner, 1796)
- Coleophora hartigi Toll, 1944
- Coleophora insulicola Toll, 1942
- Coleophora kuehnella (Goeze, 1783)
- Coleophora limosipennella (Duponchel, 1843)
- Coleophora lixella Zeller, 1849
- Coleophora lusciniaepennella (Treitschke, 1833)
- Coleophora lutipennella (Zeller, 1838)
- Coleophora maritimella Newman, 1863
- Coleophora mayrella (Hübner, 1813)
- Coleophora millefolii Zeller, 1849
- Coleophora niveicostella Zeller, 1839
- Coleophora obviella Rebel, 1914
- Coleophora oriolella Zeller, 1849
- Coleophora ornatipennella (Hübner, 1796)
- Coleophora saturatella Stainton, 1850
- Coleophora soffneriella Toll, 1961
- Coleophora taeniipennella Herrich-Schäffer, 1855
- Coleophora trigeminella Fuchs, 1881
- Coleophora trochilella (Duponchel, 1843)
- Coleophora variicornis Toll, 1952
- Coleophora versurella Zeller, 1849
- Coleophora vibicella (Hübner, 1813)
- Coleophora vulnerariae Zeller, 1839
- Coleophora wockeella Zeller, 1849
- Coleophora zelleriella Heinemann, 1854
- Metriotes lutarea (Haworth, 1828)

=== Cosmopterigidae ===
- Cosmopterix pulchrimella Chambers, 1875
- Eteobalea isabellella (O. G. Costa, 1836)
- Eteobalea serratella (Treitschke, 1833)
- Eteobalea sumptuosella (Lederer, 1855)
- Hodgesiella rebeli (Krone, 1905)
- Pancalia leuwenhoekella (Linnaeus, 1761)
- Pancalia nodosella (Bruand, 1851)
- Pancalia schwarzella (Fabricius, 1798)
- Pyroderces argyrogrammos (Zeller, 1847)
- Sorhagenia lophyrella (Douglas, 1846)

=== Cossidae ===
- Cossus cossus (Linnaeus, 1758)
- Dyspessa ulula (Borkhausen, 1790)
- Parahypopta caestrum (Hübner, 1808)
- Phragmataecia castaneae (Hübner, 1790)
- Zeuzera pyrina (Linnaeus, 1761)

=== Crambidae ===
- Achyra nudalis (Hübner, 1796)
- Agriphila brioniellus (Zerny, 1914)
- Agriphila inquinatella (Denis & Schiffermüller, 1775)
- Agriphila straminella (Denis & Schiffermüller, 1775)
- Agriphila tolli (Błeszyński, 1952)
- Agriphila tristella (Denis & Schiffermüller, 1775)
- Anania crocealis (Hübner, 1796)
- Anania funebris (Strom, 1768)
- Anania fuscalis (Denis & Schiffermüller, 1775)
- Anania hortulata (Linnaeus, 1758)
- Anania verbascalis (Denis & Schiffermüller, 1775)
- Ancylolomia palpella (Denis & Schiffermüller, 1775)
- Ancylolomia tentaculella (Hübner, 1796)
- Aporodes floralis (Hübner, 1809)
- Cataclysta lemnata (Linnaeus, 1758)
- Catoptria acutangulellus (Herrich-Schäffer, 1847)
- Catoptria confusellus (Staudinger, 1882)
- Catoptria falsella (Denis & Schiffermüller, 1775)
- Catoptria kasyi Błeszyński, 1960
- Catoptria languidellus (Zeller, 1863)
- Catoptria mytilella (Hübner, 1805)
- Catoptria pauperellus (Treitschke, 1832)
- Catoptria pinella (Linnaeus, 1758)
- Chrysocrambus craterella (Scopoli, 1763)
- Chrysocrambus linetella (Fabricius, 1781)
- Chrysoteuchia culmella (Linnaeus, 1758)
- Cornifrons ulceratalis Lederer, 1858
- Crambus lathoniellus (Zincken, 1817)
- Crambus pascuella (Linnaeus, 1758)
- Crambus pratella (Linnaeus, 1758)
- Cynaeda dentalis (Denis & Schiffermüller, 1775)
- Diasemia reticularis (Linnaeus, 1761)
- Diasemiopsis ramburialis (Duponchel, 1834)
- Dolicharthria bruguieralis (Duponchel, 1833)
- Dolicharthria punctalis (Denis & Schiffermüller, 1775)
- Ecpyrrhorrhoe diffusalis (Guenée, 1854)
- Ecpyrrhorrhoe rubiginalis (Hübner, 1796)
- Elophila nymphaeata (Linnaeus, 1758)
- Euchromius superbellus (Zeller, 1849)
- Eudonia mercurella (Linnaeus, 1758)
- Eudonia petrophila (Standfuss, 1848)
- Eudonia phaeoleuca (Zeller, 1846)
- Eurrhypis pollinalis (Denis & Schiffermüller, 1775)
- Evergestis aenealis (Denis & Schiffermüller, 1775)
- Evergestis frumentalis (Linnaeus, 1761)
- Evergestis sophialis (Fabricius, 1787)
- Heliothela wulfeniana (Scopoli, 1763)
- Loxostege aeruginalis (Hübner, 1796)
- Loxostege manualis (Geyer, 1832)
- Loxostege sticticalis (Linnaeus, 1761)
- Mecyna lutealis (Duponchel, 1833)
- Mecyna trinalis (Denis & Schiffermüller, 1775)
- Mesocrambus candiellus (Herrich-Schäffer, 1848)
- Metacrambus carectellus (Zeller, 1847)
- Metasia carnealis (Treitschke, 1829)
- Metasia ophialis (Treitschke, 1829)
- Metasia suppandalis (Hübner, 1823)
- Metaxmeste phrygialis (Hübner, 1796)
- Metaxmeste schrankiana (Hochenwarth, 1785)
- Nomophila noctuella (Denis & Schiffermüller, 1775)
- Orenaia alpestralis (Fabricius, 1787)
- Ostrinia nubilalis (Hübner, 1796)
- Ostrinia quadripunctalis (Denis & Schiffermüller, 1775)
- Paratalanta hyalinalis (Hübner, 1796)
- Paratalanta pandalis (Hübner, 1825)
- Pediasia contaminella (Hübner, 1796)
- Pediasia luteella (Denis & Schiffermüller, 1775)
- Platytes cerussella (Denis & Schiffermüller, 1775)
- Pleuroptya ruralis (Scopoli, 1763)
- Psammotis pulveralis (Hübner, 1796)
- Pyrausta aerealis (Hübner, 1793)
- Pyrausta aurata (Scopoli, 1763)
- Pyrausta castalis Treitschke, 1829
- Pyrausta cingulata (Linnaeus, 1758)
- Pyrausta coracinalis Leraut, 1982
- Pyrausta despicata (Scopoli, 1763)
- Pyrausta nigrata (Scopoli, 1763)
- Pyrausta obfuscata (Scopoli, 1763)
- Pyrausta purpuralis (Linnaeus, 1758)
- Pyrausta sanguinalis (Linnaeus, 1767)
- Pyrausta virginalis Duponchel, 1832
- Scoparia ingratella (Zeller, 1846)
- Scoparia manifestella (Herrich-Schäffer, 1848)
- Scoparia pyralella (Denis & Schiffermüller, 1775)
- Scoparia subfusca Haworth, 1811
- Sitochroa palealis (Denis & Schiffermüller, 1775)
- Sitochroa verticalis (Linnaeus, 1758)
- Thisanotia chrysonuchella (Scopoli, 1763)
- Udea alpinalis (Denis & Schiffermüller, 1775)
- Udea austriacalis (Herrich-Schäffer, 1851)
- Udea decrepitalis (Herrich-Schäffer, 1848)
- Udea ferrugalis (Hübner, 1796)
- Udea fulvalis (Hübner, 1809)
- Udea languidalis (Eversmann, 1842)
- Udea lutealis (Hübner, 1809)
- Udea olivalis (Denis & Schiffermüller, 1775)
- Udea rhododendronalis (Duponchel, 1834)
- Udea uliginosalis (Stephens, 1834)
- Xanthocrambus saxonellus (Zincken, 1821)

=== Douglasiidae ===
- Tinagma perdicella Zeller, 1839

=== Drepanidae ===
- Cilix glaucata (Scopoli, 1763)
- Habrosyne pyritoides (Hufnagel, 1766)
- Ochropacha duplaris (Linnaeus, 1761)
- Polyploca ridens (Fabricius, 1787)
- Tethea ocularis (Linnaeus, 1767)
- Watsonalla cultraria (Fabricius, 1775)

=== Elachistidae ===
- Agonopterix alstromeriana (Clerck, 1759)
- Agonopterix assimilella (Treitschke, 1832)
- Agonopterix capreolella (Zeller, 1839)
- Agonopterix carduella (Hübner, 1817)
- Agonopterix cnicella (Treitschke, 1832)
- Agonopterix curvipunctosa (Haworth, 1811)
- Agonopterix doronicella (Wocke, 1849)
- Agonopterix furvella (Treitschke, 1832)
- Agonopterix kaekeritziana (Linnaeus, 1767)
- Agonopterix nervosa (Haworth, 1811)
- Agonopterix pallorella (Zeller, 1839)
- Agonopterix propinquella (Treitschke, 1835)
- Agonopterix purpurea (Haworth, 1811)
- Agonopterix subpropinquella (Stainton, 1849)
- Agonopterix yeatiana (Fabricius, 1781)
- Blastodacna atra (Haworth, 1828)
- Depressaria absynthiella Herrich-Schäffer, 1865
- Depressaria beckmanni Heinemann, 1870
- Depressaria daucella (Denis & Schiffermüller, 1775)
- Depressaria depressana (Fabricius, 1775)
- Depressaria douglasella Stainton, 1849
- Depressaria pentheri Rebel, 1904
- Dystebenna stephensi (Stainton, 1849)
- Elachista stenopterella Rebel, 1932
- Ethmia aurifluella (Hübner, 1810)
- Ethmia bipunctella (Fabricius, 1775)
- Ethmia chrysopyga (Zeller, 1844)
- Ethmia flavianella (Treitschke, 1832)
- Ethmia haemorrhoidella (Eversmann, 1844)
- Ethmia pusiella (Linnaeus, 1758)
- Haplochrois albanica (Rebel & Zerny, 1932)
- Haplochrois ochraceella (Rebel, 1903)
- Heinemannia festivella (Denis & Schiffermüller, 1775)
- Heinemannia laspeyrella (Hübner, 1796)
- Hypercallia citrinalis (Scopoli, 1763)
- Luquetia orientella (Rebel, 1893)
- Orophia sordidella (Hübner, 1796)
- Telechrysis tripuncta (Haworth, 1828)

=== Epermeniidae ===
- Epermenia aequidentellus (E. Hofmann, 1867)
- Epermenia insecurella (Stainton, 1854)
- Epermenia ochreomaculellus (Millière, 1854)
- Epermenia pontificella (Hübner, 1796)
- Epermenia scurella (Stainton, 1851)
- Ochromolopis ictella (Hübner, 1813)

=== Erebidae ===
- Amata kruegeri (Ragusa, 1904)
- Amata phegea (Linnaeus, 1758)
- Apopestes spectrum (Esper, 1787)
- Arctia festiva (Hufnagel, 1766)
- Arctia villica (Linnaeus, 1758)
- Arctornis l-nigrum (Müller, 1764)
- Autophila dilucida (Hübner, 1808)
- Autophila anaphanes Boursin, 1940
- Callimorpha dominula (Linnaeus, 1758)
- Calliteara pudibunda (Linnaeus, 1758)
- Calymma communimacula (Denis & Schiffermüller, 1775)
- Calyptra thalictri (Borkhausen, 1790)
- Catocala coniuncta (Esper, 1787)
- Catocala conversa (Esper, 1783)
- Catocala disjuncta (Geyer, 1828)
- Catocala diversa (Geyer, 1828)
- Catocala elocata (Esper, 1787)
- Catocala eutychea Treitschke, 1835
- Catocala nupta (Linnaeus, 1767)
- Catocala nymphaea (Esper, 1787)
- Catocala nymphagoga (Esper, 1787)
- Catocala puerpera (Giorna, 1791)
- Chelis maculosa (Gerning, 1780)
- Clytie syriaca (Bugnion, 1837)
- Coscinia cribraria (Linnaeus, 1758)
- Coscinia striata (Linnaeus, 1758)
- Cybosia mesomella (Linnaeus, 1758)
- Cymbalophora pudica (Esper, 1785)
- Cymbalophora rivularis (Ménétries, 1832)
- Diacrisia sannio (Linnaeus, 1758)
- Diaphora luctuosa (Hübner, 1831)
- Diaphora mendica (Clerck, 1759)
- Drasteria cailino (Lefebvre, 1827)
- Dysauxes ancilla (Linnaeus, 1767)
- Dysauxes famula (Freyer, 1836)
- Dysgonia algira (Linnaeus, 1767)
- Dysgonia torrida (Guenée, 1852)
- Eilema caniola (Hübner, 1808)
- Eilema complana (Linnaeus, 1758)
- Eilema costalis (Zeller, 1847)
- Eilema depressa (Esper, 1787)
- Eilema lurideola (Zincken, 1817)
- Eilema lutarella (Linnaeus, 1758)
- Eilema palliatella (Scopoli, 1763)
- Eilema pygmaeola (Doubleday, 1847)
- Eilema sororcula (Hufnagel, 1766)
- Eublemma amoena (Hübner, 1803)
- Eublemma himmighoffeni (Millière, 1867)
- Eublemma minutata (Fabricius, 1794)
- Eublemma ostrina (Hübner, 1808)
- Eublemma parva (Hübner, 1808)
- Eublemma polygramma (Duponchel, 1842)
- Eublemma purpurina (Denis & Schiffermüller, 1775)
- Euclidia mi (Clerck, 1759)
- Euclidia glyphica (Linnaeus, 1758)
- Euplagia quadripunctaria (Poda, 1761)
- Euproctis chrysorrhoea (Linnaeus, 1758)
- Euproctis similis (Fuessly, 1775)
- Exophyla rectangularis (Geyer, 1828)
- Grammodes bifasciata (Petagna, 1787)
- Grammodes stolida (Fabricius, 1775)
- Honeyania ragusana (Freyer, 1844)
- Hypena lividalis (Hübner, 1796)
- Hypena obesalis Treitschke, 1829
- Hypena obsitalis (Hübner, 1813)
- Hypena palpalis (Hübner, 1796)
- Hypena rostralis (Linnaeus, 1758)
- Idia calvaria (Denis & Schiffermüller, 1775)
- Leucoma salicis (Linnaeus, 1758)
- Lithosia quadra (Linnaeus, 1758)
- Lygephila pastinum (Treitschke, 1826)
- Lygephila viciae (Hübner, 1822)
- Lymantria monacha (Linnaeus, 1758)
- Metachrostis velocior (Hübner, 1813)
- Miltochrista miniata (Forster, 1771)
- Minucia lunaris (Denis & Schiffermüller, 1775)
- Nodaria nodosalis (Herrich-Schäffer, 1851)
- Ocneria rubea (Denis & Schiffermüller, 1775)
- Odice suava (Hübner, 1813)
- Orectis proboscidata (Herrich-Schäffer, 1851)
- Paracolax tristalis (Fabricius, 1794)
- Parasemia plantaginis (Linnaeus, 1758)
- Parocneria terebinthi (Freyer, 1838)
- Pechipogo plumigeralis Hübner, 1825
- Phragmatobia fuliginosa (Linnaeus, 1758)
- Phragmatobia luctifera (Denis & Schiffermüller, 1775)
- Phragmatobia placida (Frivaldszky, 1835)
- Phytometra viridaria (Clerck, 1759)
- Polypogon tentacularia (Linnaeus, 1758)
- Rhypagla lacernaria (Hübner, 1813)
- Rhyparia purpurata (Linnaeus, 1758)
- Rivula sericealis (Scopoli, 1763)
- Schrankia costaestrigalis (Stephens, 1834)
- Scoliopteryx libatrix (Linnaeus, 1758)
- Setina irrorella (Linnaeus, 1758)
- Spilosoma lubricipeda (Linnaeus, 1758)
- Spilosoma lutea (Hufnagel, 1766)
- Trisateles emortualis (Denis & Schiffermüller, 1775)
- Tyria jacobaeae (Linnaeus, 1758)
- Utetheisa pulchella (Linnaeus, 1758)
- Watsonarctia deserta (Bartel, 1902)
- Zanclognatha lunalis (Scopoli, 1763)
- Zanclognatha zelleralis (Wocke, 1850)
- Zebeeba falsalis (Herrich-Schäffer, 1839)
- Zekelita antiqualis (Hübner, 1809)

=== Euteliidae ===
- Eutelia adulatrix (Hübner, 1813)

=== Gelechiidae ===
- Acompsia cinerella (Clerck, 1759)
- Acompsia ponomarenkoae Huemer & Karsholt, 2002
- Agonochaetia terrestrella (Zeller, 1872)
- Anacampsis obscurella (Denis & Schiffermüller, 1775)
- Anacampsis scintillella (Fischer von Röslerstamm, 1841)
- Anacampsis timidella (Wocke, 1887)
- Anarsia lineatella Zeller, 1839
- Apodia bifractella (Duponchel, 1843)
- Aproaerema anthyllidella (Hübner, 1813)
- Aristotelia decurtella (Hübner, 1813)
- Aristotelia subdecurtella (Stainton, 1859)
- Aroga velocella (Duponchel, 1838)
- Brachmia dimidiella (Denis & Schiffermüller, 1775)
- Bryotropha affinis (Haworth, 1828)
- Bryotropha desertella (Douglas, 1850)
- Bryotropha domestica (Haworth, 1828)
- Bryotropha dryadella (Zeller, 1850)
- Bryotropha senectella (Zeller, 1839)
- Bryotropha similis (Stainton, 1854)
- Bryotropha terrella (Denis & Schiffermüller, 1775)
- Carpatolechia decorella (Haworth, 1812)
- Carpatolechia proximella (Hübner, 1796)
- Caryocolum leucomelanella (Zeller, 1839)
- Caryocolum marmorea (Haworth, 1828)
- Caryocolum proxima (Haworth, 1828)
- Chionodes distinctella (Zeller, 1839)
- Chrysoesthia drurella (Fabricius, 1775)
- Chrysoesthia sexguttella (Thunberg, 1794)
- Crossobela trinotella (Herrich-Schäffer, 1856)
- Dichomeris acuminatus (Staudinger, 1876)
- Dichomeris alacella (Zeller, 1839)
- Eulamprotes atrella (Denis & Schiffermüller, 1775)
- Eulamprotes unicolorella (Duponchel, 1843)
- Filatima spurcella (Duponchel, 1843)
- Isophrictis striatella (Denis & Schiffermüller, 1775)
- Megacraspedus binotella (Duponchel, 1843)
- Megacraspedus dolosellus (Zeller, 1839)
- Megacraspedus separatellus (Fischer von Röslerstamm, 1843)
- Metzneria aprilella (Herrich-Schäffer, 1854)
- Metzneria artificella (Herrich-Schäffer, 1861)
- Metzneria intestinella (Mann, 1864)
- Metzneria lappella (Linnaeus, 1758)
- Metzneria neuropterella (Zeller, 1839)
- Metzneria paucipunctella (Zeller, 1839)
- Mirificarma cytisella (Treitschke, 1833)
- Mirificarma eburnella (Denis & Schiffermüller, 1775)
- Mirificarma maculatella (Hübner, 1796)
- Mirificarma monticolella (Rebel, 1931)
- Monochroa conspersella (Herrich-Schäffer, 1854)
- Monochroa sepicolella (Herrich-Schäffer, 1854)
- Monochroa tenebrella (Hübner, 1817)
- Neofaculta ericetella (Geyer, 1832)
- Neofaculta infernella (Herrich-Schäffer, 1854)
- Nothris lemniscellus (Zeller, 1839)
- Nothris verbascella (Denis & Schiffermüller, 1775)
- Pectinophora gossypiella (Saunders, 1844)
- Platyedra subcinerea (Haworth, 1828)
- Prolita sexpunctella (Fabricius, 1794)
- Prolita solutella (Zeller, 1839)
- Pseudotelphusa paripunctella (Thunberg, 1794)
- Recurvaria nanella (Denis & Schiffermüller, 1775)
- Sattleria triglavica Povolny, 1987
- Scrobipalpa artemisiella (Treitschke, 1833)
- Scrobipalpa obsoletella (Fischer von Röslerstamm, 1841)
- Scrobipalpa ocellatella (Boyd, 1858)
- Scrobipalpa salinella (Zeller, 1847)
- Sitotroga cerealella (Olivier, 1789)
- Sophronia humerella (Denis & Schiffermüller, 1775)
- Sophronia illustrella (Hübner, 1796)
- Sophronia semicostella (Hübner, 1813)
- Stenolechia gemmella (Linnaeus, 1758)
- Stomopteryx detersella (Zeller, 1847)
- Syncopacma taeniolella (Zeller, 1839)
- Teleiodes vulgella (Denis & Schiffermüller, 1775)
- Teleiopsis diffinis (Haworth, 1828)
- Teleiopsis terebinthinella (Herrich-Schäffer, 1856)

=== Geometridae ===
- Abraxas grossulariata (Linnaeus, 1758)
- Agriopis leucophaearia (Denis & Schiffermüller, 1775)
- Alcis repandata (Linnaeus, 1758)
- Alsophila aceraria (Denis & Schiffermüller, 1775)
- Angerona prunaria (Linnaeus, 1758)
- Anticollix sparsata (Treitschke, 1828)
- Aplasta ononaria (Fuessly, 1783)
- Aplocera efformata (Guenée, 1858)
- Aplocera plagiata (Linnaeus, 1758)
- Aplocera praeformata (Hübner, 1826)
- Aplocera simpliciata (Treitschke, 1835)
- Ascotis selenaria (Denis & Schiffermüller, 1775)
- Aspitates gilvaria (Denis & Schiffermüller, 1775)
- Aspitates ochrearia (Rossi, 1794)
- Asthena albulata (Hufnagel, 1767)
- Bupalus piniaria (Linnaeus, 1758)
- Cabera exanthemata (Scopoli, 1763)
- Cabera pusaria (Linnaeus, 1758)
- Campaea honoraria (Denis & Schiffermüller, 1775)
- Campaea margaritaria (Linnaeus, 1761)
- Camptogramma bilineata (Linnaeus, 1758)
- Camptogramma scripturata (Hübner, 1799)
- Carsia lythoxylata (Hübner, 1799)
- Casilda antophilaria (Hübner, 1813)
- Cataclysme riguata (Hübner, 1813)
- Catarhoe putridaria (Herrich-Schäffer, 1852)
- Catarhoe rubidata (Denis & Schiffermüller, 1775)
- Charissa certhiatus (Rebel & Zerny, 1931)
- Charissa obscurata (Denis & Schiffermüller, 1775)
- Charissa pullata (Denis & Schiffermüller, 1775)
- Charissa variegata (Duponchel, 1830)
- Charissa onustaria (Herrich-Schäffer, 1852)
- Charissa supinaria (Mann, 1854)
- Charissa glaucinaria (Hübner, 1799)
- Chiasmia aestimaria (Hübner, 1809)
- Chiasmia clathrata (Linnaeus, 1758)
- Chlorissa cloraria (Hübner, 1813)
- Chlorissa viridata (Linnaeus, 1758)
- Chloroclysta siterata (Hufnagel, 1767)
- Cidaria fulvata (Forster, 1771)
- Cleora cinctaria (Denis & Schiffermüller, 1775)
- Cleorodes lichenaria (Hufnagel, 1767)
- Cleta filacearia (Herrich-Schäffer, 1847)
- Coenotephria ablutaria (Boisduval, 1840)
- Colostygia aptata (Hübner, 1813)
- Colostygia aqueata (Hübner, 1813)
- Colostygia pectinataria (Knoch, 1781)
- Colotois pennaria (Linnaeus, 1761)
- Cosmorhoe ocellata (Linnaeus, 1758)
- Costaconvexa polygrammata (Borkhausen, 1794)
- Cyclophora porata (Linnaeus, 1767)
- Cyclophora punctaria (Linnaeus, 1758)
- Cyclophora suppunctaria (Zeller, 1847)
- Cyclophora albiocellaria (Hübner, 1789)
- Cyclophora annularia (Fabricius, 1775)
- Cyclophora puppillaria (Hübner, 1799)
- Cyclophora quercimontaria (Bastelberger, 1897)
- Cyclophora ruficiliaria (Herrich-Schäffer, 1855)
- Dyscia innocentaria (Christoph, 1885)
- Dyscia raunaria (Freyer, 1852)
- Ectropis crepuscularia (Denis & Schiffermüller, 1775)
- Eilicrinia trinotata (Metzner, 1845)
- Ematurga atomaria (Linnaeus, 1758)
- Ennomos quercaria (Hübner, 1813)
- Entephria cyanata (Hübner, 1809)
- Entephria flavicinctata (Hübner, 1813)
- Entephria nobiliaria (Herrich-Schäffer, 1852)
- Epirrhoe alternata (Müller, 1764)
- Epirrhoe galiata (Denis & Schiffermüller, 1775)
- Epirrita christyi (Allen, 1906)
- Epirrita dilutata (Denis & Schiffermüller, 1775)
- Euchoeca nebulata (Scopoli, 1763)
- Eucrostes indigenata (de Villers, 1789)
- Eumannia oppositaria (Mann, 1864)
- Euphyia frustata (Treitschke, 1828)
- Eupithecia actaeata Walderdorff, 1869
- Eupithecia breviculata (Donzel, 1837)
- Eupithecia centaureata (Denis & Schiffermüller, 1775)
- Eupithecia cretaceata (Packard, 1874)
- Eupithecia cuculliaria (Rebel, 1901)
- Eupithecia distinctaria Herrich-Schäffer, 1848
- Eupithecia dodoneata Guenée, 1858
- Eupithecia druentiata Dietze, 1902
- Eupithecia ericeata (Rambur, 1833)
- Eupithecia extraversaria Herrich-Schäffer, 1852
- Eupithecia extremata (Fabricius, 1787)
- Eupithecia gemellata Herrich-Schäffer, 1861
- Eupithecia gratiosata Herrich-Schäffer, 1861
- Eupithecia gueneata Millière, 1862
- Eupithecia haworthiata Doubleday, 1856
- Eupithecia icterata (de Villers, 1789)
- Eupithecia impurata (Hübner, 1813)
- Eupithecia innotata (Hufnagel, 1767)
- Eupithecia laquaearia Herrich-Schäffer, 1848
- Eupithecia lariciata (Freyer, 1841)
- Eupithecia orphnata W. Petersen, 1909
- Eupithecia pusillata (Denis & Schiffermüller, 1775)
- Eupithecia pyreneata Mabille, 1871
- Eupithecia riparia Herrich-Schäffer, 1851
- Eupithecia satyrata (Hübner, 1813)
- Eupithecia scalptata Christoph, 1885
- Eupithecia semigraphata Bruand, 1850
- Eupithecia silenata Assmann, 1848
- Eupithecia subfuscata (Haworth, 1809)
- Eupithecia subumbrata (Denis & Schiffermüller, 1775)
- Eupithecia tripunctaria Herrich-Schäffer, 1852
- Eupithecia venosata (Fabricius, 1787)
- Eupithecia vulgata (Haworth, 1809)
- Fagivorina arenaria (Hufnagel, 1767)
- Gandaritis pyraliata (Denis & Schiffermüller, 1775)
- Gnopharmia stevenaria (Boisduval, 1840)
- Gnophos sartata Treitschke, 1827
- Gnophos furvata (Denis & Schiffermüller, 1775)
- Gnophos obfuscata (Denis & Schiffermüller, 1775)
- Gymnoscelis rufifasciata (Haworth, 1809)
- Heliomata glarearia (Denis & Schiffermüller, 1775)
- Hemistola chrysoprasaria (Esper, 1795)
- Horisme calligraphata (Herrich-Schäffer, 1838)
- Horisme corticata (Treitschke, 1835)
- Horisme tersata (Denis & Schiffermüller, 1775)
- Horisme vitalbata (Denis & Schiffermüller, 1775)
- Hydriomena impluviata (Denis & Schiffermüller, 1775)
- Hylaea fasciaria (Linnaeus, 1758)
- Hypomecis punctinalis (Scopoli, 1763)
- Idaea albitorquata (Pungeler, 1909)
- Idaea aureolaria (Denis & Schiffermüller, 1775)
- Idaea aversata (Linnaeus, 1758)
- Idaea camparia (Herrich-Schäffer, 1852)
- Idaea consanguinaria (Lederer, 1853)
- Idaea consolidata (Lederer, 1853)
- Idaea degeneraria (Hübner, 1799)
- Idaea determinata (Staudinger, 1876)
- Idaea deversaria (Herrich-Schäffer, 1847)
- Idaea dilutaria (Hübner, 1799)
- Idaea dimidiata (Hufnagel, 1767)
- Idaea distinctaria (Boisduval, 1840)
- Idaea elongaria (Rambur, 1833)
- Idaea filicata (Hübner, 1799)
- Idaea fuscovenosa (Goeze, 1781)
- Idaea humiliata (Hufnagel, 1767)
- Idaea infirmaria (Rambur, 1833)
- Idaea inquinata (Scopoli, 1763)
- Idaea laevigata (Scopoli, 1763)
- Idaea metohiensis (Rebel, 1900)
- Idaea moniliata (Denis & Schiffermüller, 1775)
- Idaea obsoletaria (Rambur, 1833)
- Idaea ochrata (Scopoli, 1763)
- Idaea ostrinaria (Hübner, 1813)
- Idaea pallidata (Denis & Schiffermüller, 1775)
- Idaea politaria (Hübner, 1799)
- Idaea rubraria (Staudinger, 1901)
- Idaea rufaria (Hübner, 1799)
- Idaea rusticata (Denis & Schiffermüller, 1775)
- Idaea seriata (Schrank, 1802)
- Idaea serpentata (Hufnagel, 1767)
- Idaea straminata (Borkhausen, 1794)
- Idaea subsericeata (Haworth, 1809)
- Idaea trigeminata (Haworth, 1809)
- Isturgia arenacearia (Denis & Schiffermüller, 1775)
- Isturgia roraria (Fabricius, 1776)
- Ligdia adustata (Denis & Schiffermüller, 1775)
- Lomaspilis marginata (Linnaeus, 1758)
- Lycia graecarius (Staudinger, 1861)
- Lycia hirtaria (Clerck, 1759)
- Lythria cruentaria (Hufnagel, 1767)
- Lythria purpuraria (Linnaeus, 1758)
- Macaria artesiaria (Denis & Schiffermüller, 1775)
- Melanthia procellata (Denis & Schiffermüller, 1775)
- Menophra abruptaria (Thunberg, 1792)
- Mesotype didymata (Linnaeus, 1758)
- Mesotype verberata (Scopoli, 1763)
- Microloxia herbaria (Hübner, 1813)
- Minoa murinata (Scopoli, 1763)
- Nebula achromaria (de La Harpe, 1853)
- Nebula nebulata (Treitschke, 1828)
- Nychiodes dalmatina Wagner, 1909
- Nycterosea obstipata (Fabricius, 1794)
- Odezia atrata (Linnaeus, 1758)
- Odontopera bidentata (Clerck, 1759)
- Opisthograptis luteolata (Linnaeus, 1758)
- Orthostixis cribraria (Hübner, 1799)
- Pachycnemia hippocastanaria (Hübner, 1799)
- Pasiphila rectangulata (Linnaeus, 1758)
- Peribatodes correptaria (Zeller, 1847)
- Peribatodes rhomboidaria (Denis & Schiffermüller, 1775)
- Peribatodes umbraria (Hübner, 1809)
- Perizoma albulata (Denis & Schiffermüller, 1775)
- Perizoma alchemillata (Linnaeus, 1758)
- Perizoma bifaciata (Haworth, 1809)
- Perizoma flavofasciata (Thunberg, 1792)
- Perizoma incultaria (Herrich-Schäffer, 1848)
- Perizoma obsoletata (Herrich-Schäffer, 1838)
- Petrophora chlorosata (Scopoli, 1763)
- Phaiogramma etruscaria (Zeller, 1849)
- Philereme transversata (Hufnagel, 1767)
- Protorhoe corollaria (Herrich-Schäffer, 1848)
- Protorhoe unicata (Guenée, 1858)
- Pseudobaptria bogumilaria (Rebel, 1904)
- Pseudopanthera macularia (Linnaeus, 1758)
- Pseudoterpna pruinata (Hufnagel, 1767)
- Psodos quadrifaria (Sulzer, 1776)
- Pungeleria capreolaria (Denis & Schiffermüller, 1775)
- Rhodometra sacraria (Linnaeus, 1767)
- Rhodostrophia calabra (Petagna, 1786)
- Rhodostrophia discopunctata Amsel, 1935
- Rhodostrophia vibicaria (Clerck, 1759)
- Rhoptria asperaria (Hübner, 1817)
- Schistostege decussata (Denis & Schiffermüller, 1775)
- Sciadia tenebraria (Esper, 1806)
- Scopula confinaria (Herrich-Schäffer, 1847)
- Scopula flaccidaria (Zeller, 1852)
- Scopula imitaria (Hübner, 1799)
- Scopula incanata (Linnaeus, 1758)
- Scopula marginepunctata (Goeze, 1781)
- Scopula minorata (Boisduval, 1833)
- Scopula decorata (Denis & Schiffermüller, 1775)
- Scopula immorata (Linnaeus, 1758)
- Scopula nigropunctata (Hufnagel, 1767)
- Scopula ornata (Scopoli, 1763)
- Scopula rubiginata (Hufnagel, 1767)
- Scopula submutata (Treitschke, 1828)
- Scopula tessellaria (Boisduval, 1840)
- Scopula turbulentaria (Staudinger, 1870)
- Scotopteryx bipunctaria (Denis & Schiffermüller, 1775)
- Scotopteryx chenopodiata (Linnaeus, 1758)
- Scotopteryx coarctaria (Denis & Schiffermüller, 1775)
- Scotopteryx moeniata (Scopoli, 1763)
- Scotopteryx mucronata (Scopoli, 1763)
- Selenia lunularia (Hübner, 1788)
- Selidosema brunnearia (de Villers, 1789)
- Selidosema plumaria (Denis & Schiffermüller, 1775)
- Siona lineata (Scopoli, 1763)
- Synopsia sociaria (Hübner, 1799)
- Thalera fimbrialis (Scopoli, 1763)
- Thera cognata (Thunberg, 1792)
- Thera juniperata (Linnaeus, 1758)
- Thera variata (Denis & Schiffermüller, 1775)
- Thetidia smaragdaria (Fabricius, 1787)
- Timandra comae Schmidt, 1931
- Triphosa dubitata (Linnaeus, 1758)
- Triphosa sabaudiata (Duponchel, 1830)
- Xanthorhoe fluctuata (Linnaeus, 1758)
- Xanthorhoe montanata (Denis & Schiffermüller, 1775)
- Xanthorhoe spadicearia (Denis & Schiffermüller, 1775)
- Xenochlorodes olympiaria (Herrich-Schäffer, 1852)

=== Glyphipterigidae ===
- Digitivalva pulicariae (Klimesch, 1956)
- Glyphipterix loricatella (Treitschke, 1833)

=== Gracillariidae ===
- Aspilapteryx limosella (Duponchel, 1843)
- Aspilapteryx tringipennella (Zeller, 1839)
- Caloptilia alchimiella (Scopoli, 1763)
- Caloptilia cuculipennella (Hübner, 1796)
- Caloptilia elongella (Linnaeus, 1761)
- Caloptilia rhodinella (Herrich-Schäffer, 1855)
- Calybites phasianipennella (Hübner, 1813)
- Cameraria ohridella Deschka & Dimic, 1986
- Euspilapteryx auroguttella Stephens, 1835
- Micrurapteryx kollariella (Zeller, 1839)
- Parectopa ononidis (Zeller, 1839)
- Parornix anglicella (Stainton, 1850)
- Parornix fagivora (Frey, 1861)
- Phyllonorycter abrasella (Duponchel, 1843)
- Phyllonorycter acerifoliella (Zeller, 1839)
- Phyllonorycter cavella (Zeller, 1846)
- Phyllonorycter cerasicolella (Herrich-Schäffer, 1855)
- Phyllonorycter cerasinella (Reutti, 1852)
- Phyllonorycter esperella (Goeze, 1783)
- Phyllonorycter froelichiella (Zeller, 1839)
- Phyllonorycter klemannella (Fabricius, 1781)
- Phyllonorycter kuhlweiniella (Zeller, 1839)
- Phyllonorycter maestingella (Müller, 1764)
- Phyllonorycter quercifoliella (Zeller, 1839)
- Phyllonorycter rajella (Linnaeus, 1758)
- Phyllonorycter roboris (Zeller, 1839)
- Phyllonorycter scitulella (Duponchel, 1843)
- Phyllonorycter spinicolella (Zeller, 1846)
- Phyllonorycter strigulatella (Lienig & Zeller, 1846)

=== Heliozelidae ===
- Antispila treitschkiella (Fischer von Röslerstamm, 1843)

=== Hepialidae ===
- Pharmacis lupulina (Linnaeus, 1758)
- Phymatopus hecta (Linnaeus, 1758)
- Triodia amasinus (Herrich-Schäffer, 1851)
- Triodia sylvina (Linnaeus, 1761)

=== Heterogynidae ===
- Heterogynis penella (Hübner, 1819)

=== Incurvariidae ===
- Incurvaria masculella (Denis & Schiffermüller, 1775)
- Incurvaria oehlmanniella (Hübner, 1796)
- Incurvaria pectinea Haworth, 1828
- Incurvaria praelatella (Denis & Schiffermüller, 1775)

=== Lasiocampidae ===
- Gastropacha quercifolia (Linnaeus, 1758)
- Lasiocampa quercus (Linnaeus, 1758)
- Lasiocampa grandis (Rogenhofer, 1891)
- Lasiocampa trifolii (Denis & Schiffermüller, 1775)
- Malacosoma castrensis (Linnaeus, 1758)
- Malacosoma neustria (Linnaeus, 1758)
- Odonestis pruni (Linnaeus, 1758)
- Pachypasa otus (Drury, 1773)
- Phyllodesma tremulifolia (Hübner, 1810)
- Poecilocampa populi (Linnaeus, 1758)

=== Lecithoceridae ===
- Homaloxestis briantiella (Turati, 1879)
- Lecithocera nigrana (Duponchel, 1836)

=== Limacodidae ===
- Heterogenea asella (Denis & Schiffermüller, 1775)

=== Lyonetiidae ===
- Leucoptera malifoliella (O. Costa, 1836)

=== Lypusidae ===
- Lypusa tokari Elsner, Liska & Petru, 2008
- Pseudatemelia flavifrontella (Denis & Schiffermüller, 1775)
- Pseudatemelia subochreella (Doubleday, 1859)

=== Micropterigidae ===
- Micropterix calthella (Linnaeus, 1761)
- Micropterix kardamylensis Rebel, 1903
- Micropterix myrtetella Zeller, 1850

=== Millieridae ===
- Millieria dolosalis (Heydenreich, 1851)

=== Momphidae ===
- Mompha langiella (Hübner, 1796)

=== Nepticulidae ===
- Ectoedemia hannoverella (Glitz, 1872)
- Ectoedemia turbidella (Zeller, 1848)
- Ectoedemia groschkei (Skala, 1943)
- Stigmella anomalella (Goeze, 1783)
- Stigmella aurella (Fabricius, 1775)
- Stigmella centifoliella (Zeller, 1848)
- Stigmella trimaculella (Haworth, 1828)

=== Noctuidae ===
- Abrostola agnorista Dufay, 1956
- Abrostola tripartita (Hufnagel, 1766)
- Abrostola triplasia (Linnaeus, 1758)
- Acontia lucida (Hufnagel, 1766)
- Acontia trabealis (Scopoli, 1763)
- Acontiola lascivalis (Lederer, 1855)
- Acontiola moldavicola (Herrich-Schäffer, 1851)
- Acronicta aceris (Linnaeus, 1758)
- Acronicta psi (Linnaeus, 1758)
- Acronicta tridens (Denis & Schiffermüller, 1775)
- Acronicta euphorbiae (Denis & Schiffermüller, 1775)
- Acronicta orientalis (Mann, 1862)
- Acronicta rumicis (Linnaeus, 1758)
- Actinotia radiosa (Esper, 1804)
- Aedia funesta (Esper, 1786)
- Aedia leucomelas (Linnaeus, 1758)
- Aegle koekeritziana (Hübner, 1799)
- Aegle semicana (Esper, 1798)
- Agrochola lychnidis (Denis & Schiffermüller, 1775)
- Agrochola helvola (Linnaeus, 1758)
- Agrochola nitida (Denis & Schiffermüller, 1775)
- Agrotis bigramma (Esper, 1790)
- Agrotis catalaunensis (Millière, 1873)
- Agrotis cinerea (Denis & Schiffermüller, 1775)
- Agrotis clavis (Hufnagel, 1766)
- Agrotis exclamationis (Linnaeus, 1758)
- Agrotis ipsilon (Hufnagel, 1766)
- Agrotis puta (Hübner, 1803)
- Agrotis segetum (Denis & Schiffermüller, 1775)
- Agrotis spinifera (Hübner, 1808)
- Agrotis trux (Hübner, 1824)
- Allophyes oxyacanthae (Linnaeus, 1758)
- Amephana dalmatica (Rebel, 1919)
- Ammoconia senex (Geyer, 1828)
- Amphipyra effusa Boisduval, 1828
- Amphipyra pyramidea (Linnaeus, 1758)
- Amphipyra tragopoginis (Clerck, 1759)
- Anarta melanopa (Thunberg, 1791)
- Anarta odontites (Boisduval, 1829)
- Anarta stigmosa (Christoph, 1887)
- Anarta trifolii (Hufnagel, 1766)
- Antitype jonis (Lederer, 1865)
- Apamea epomidion (Haworth, 1809)
- Apamea furva (Denis & Schiffermüller, 1775)
- Apamea illyria Freyer, 1846
- Apamea lateritia (Hufnagel, 1766)
- Apamea maillardi (Geyer, 1834)
- Apamea monoglypha (Hufnagel, 1766)
- Apamea platinea (Treitschke, 1825)
- Apamea remissa (Hübner, 1809)
- Apamea sordens (Hufnagel, 1766)
- Apamea sublustris (Esper, 1788)
- Apamea syriaca (Osthelder, 1933)
- Apamea zeta (Treitschke, 1825)
- Aporophyla australis (Boisduval, 1829)
- Aporophyla canescens (Duponchel, 1826)
- Aporophyla nigra (Haworth, 1809)
- Apterogenum ypsillon (Denis & Schiffermüller, 1775)
- Atethmia centrago (Haworth, 1809)
- Athetis hospes (Freyer, 1831)
- Atypha pulmonaris (Esper, 1790)
- Autographa gamma (Linnaeus, 1758)
- Axylia putris (Linnaeus, 1761)
- Brachylomia viminalis (Fabricius, 1776)
- Brithys crini (Fabricius, 1775)
- Bryophila ereptricula Treitschke, 1825
- Bryophila raptricula (Denis & Schiffermüller, 1775)
- Bryophila rectilinea (Warren, 1909)
- Calamia tridens (Hufnagel, 1766)
- Callopistria juventina (Stoll, 1782)
- Callopistria latreillei (Duponchel, 1827)
- Calophasia lunula (Hufnagel, 1766)
- Calophasia opalina (Esper, 1793)
- Calophasia platyptera (Esper, 1788)
- Caradrina gilva (Donzel, 1837)
- Caradrina clavipalpis Scopoli, 1763
- Caradrina flavirena Guenée, 1852
- Caradrina selini Boisduval, 1840
- Caradrina wullschlegeli Pungeler, 1903
- Caradrina aspersa Rambur, 1834
- Caradrina kadenii Freyer, 1836
- Ceramica pisi (Linnaeus, 1758)
- Cerapteryx graminis (Linnaeus, 1758)
- Cerastis rubricosa (Denis & Schiffermüller, 1775)
- Charanyca trigrammica (Hufnagel, 1766)
- Charanyca ferruginea (Esper, 1785)
- Chersotis cuprea (Denis & Schiffermüller, 1775)
- Chersotis fimbriola (Esper, 1803)
- Chersotis laeta (Rebel, 1904)
- Chersotis multangula (Hübner, 1803)
- Chilodes maritima (Tauscher, 1806)
- Chloantha hyperici (Denis & Schiffermüller, 1775)
- Chrysodeixis chalcites (Esper, 1789)
- Condica viscosa (Freyer, 1831)
- Conisania luteago (Denis & Schiffermüller, 1775)
- Conistra erythrocephala (Denis & Schiffermüller, 1775)
- Cornutiplusia circumflexa (Linnaeus, 1767)
- Cosmia trapezina (Linnaeus, 1758)
- Cosmia diffinis (Linnaeus, 1767)
- Cosmia confinis Herrich-Schäffer, 1849
- Craniophora ligustri (Denis & Schiffermüller, 1775)
- Cryphia fraudatricula (Hübner, 1803)
- Cryphia algae (Fabricius, 1775)
- Cryphia ochsi (Boursin, 1940)
- Ctenoplusia accentifera (Lefebvre, 1827)
- Cucullia celsiae Herrich-Schäffer, 1850
- Cucullia calendulae Treitschke, 1835
- Cucullia lactucae (Denis & Schiffermüller, 1775)
- Cucullia scopariae Dorfmeister, 1853
- Cucullia tanaceti (Denis & Schiffermüller, 1775)
- Cucullia umbratica (Linnaeus, 1758)
- Cucullia xeranthemi Boisduval, 1840
- Cucullia blattariae (Esper, 1790)
- Cucullia verbasci (Linnaeus, 1758)
- Deltote pygarga (Hufnagel, 1766)
- Denticucullus pygmina (Haworth, 1809)
- Diachrysia chrysitis (Linnaeus, 1758)
- Diarsia mendica (Fabricius, 1775)
- Dichagyris flammatra (Denis & Schiffermüller, 1775)
- Dichagyris candelisequa (Denis & Schiffermüller, 1775)
- Dichagyris forcipula (Denis & Schiffermüller, 1775)
- Dichagyris nigrescens (Hofner, 1888)
- Dichagyris renigera (Hübner, 1808)
- Dicycla oo (Linnaeus, 1758)
- Diloba caeruleocephala (Linnaeus, 1758)
- Dypterygia scabriuscula (Linnaeus, 1758)
- Elaphria venustula (Hübner, 1790)
- Epilecta linogrisea (Denis & Schiffermüller, 1775)
- Epimecia ustula (Freyer, 1835)
- Epipsilia grisescens (Fabricius, 1794)
- Episema glaucina (Esper, 1789)
- Eucarta amethystina (Hübner, 1803)
- Euchalcia modestoides Poole, 1989
- Eugnorisma depuncta (Linnaeus, 1761)
- Euplexia lucipara (Linnaeus, 1758)
- Eupsilia transversa (Hufnagel, 1766)
- Euxoa birivia (Denis & Schiffermüller, 1775)
- Euxoa decora (Denis & Schiffermüller, 1775)
- Euxoa distinguenda (Lederer, 1857)
- Euxoa hastifera (Donzel, 1847)
- Euxoa nigricans (Linnaeus, 1761)
- Euxoa obelisca (Denis & Schiffermüller, 1775)
- Euxoa temera (Hübner, 1808)
- Globia algae (Esper, 1789)
- Gortyna moesiaca Herrich-Schäffer, 1849
- Hada plebeja (Linnaeus, 1761)
- Hadena perplexa (Denis & Schiffermüller, 1775)
- Hadena caesia (Denis & Schiffermüller, 1775)
- Hadena capsincola (Denis & Schiffermüller, 1775)
- Hadena compta (Denis & Schiffermüller, 1775)
- Hadena confusa (Hufnagel, 1766)
- Hadena filograna (Esper, 1788)
- Hadena magnolii (Boisduval, 1829)
- Hadena vulcanica (Turati, 1907)
- Hadena tephroleuca (Boisduval, 1833)
- Hecatera bicolorata (Hufnagel, 1766)
- Hecatera cappa (Hübner, 1809)
- Hecatera dysodea (Denis & Schiffermüller, 1775)
- Helicoverpa armigera (Hübner, 1808)
- Heliothis nubigera Herrich-Schäffer, 1851
- Heliothis peltigera (Denis & Schiffermüller, 1775)
- Heliothis viriplaca (Hufnagel, 1766)
- Helotropha leucostigma (Hübner, 1808)
- Hoplodrina ambigua (Denis & Schiffermüller, 1775)
- Hoplodrina blanda (Denis & Schiffermüller, 1775)
- Hoplodrina octogenaria (Goeze, 1781)
- Hoplodrina respersa (Denis & Schiffermüller, 1775)
- Hoplodrina superstes (Ochsenheimer, 1816)
- Jodia croceago (Denis & Schiffermüller, 1775)
- Lacanobia oleracea (Linnaeus, 1758)
- Lacanobia w-latinum (Hufnagel, 1766)
- Lamprosticta culta (Denis & Schiffermüller, 1775)
- Lasionycta imbecilla (Fabricius, 1794)
- Lasionycta proxima (Hübner, 1809)
- Leucania comma (Linnaeus, 1761)
- Leucania putrescens (Hübner, 1824)
- Leucania zeae (Duponchel, 1827)
- Macdunnoughia confusa (Stephens, 1850)
- Mamestra brassicae (Linnaeus, 1758)
- Mesapamea secalella Remm, 1983
- Mesapamea secalis (Linnaeus, 1758)
- Mesotrosta signalis (Treitschke, 1829)
- Mniotype adusta (Esper, 1790)
- Mniotype solieri (Boisduval, 1829)
- Mormo maura (Linnaeus, 1758)
- Mythimna riparia (Rambur, 1829)
- Mythimna albipuncta (Denis & Schiffermüller, 1775)
- Mythimna congrua (Hübner, 1817)
- Mythimna ferrago (Fabricius, 1787)
- Mythimna l-album (Linnaeus, 1767)
- Mythimna straminea (Treitschke, 1825)
- Mythimna turca (Linnaeus, 1761)
- Mythimna vitellina (Hübner, 1808)
- Mythimna unipuncta (Haworth, 1809)
- Mythimna andereggii (Boisduval, 1840)
- Mythimna sicula (Treitschke, 1835)
- Noctua comes Hübner, 1813
- Noctua fimbriata (Schreber, 1759)
- Noctua interjecta Hübner, 1803
- Noctua interposita (Hübner, 1790)
- Noctua janthe (Borkhausen, 1792)
- Noctua janthina Denis & Schiffermüller, 1775
- Noctua orbona (Hufnagel, 1766)
- Noctua pronuba (Linnaeus, 1758)
- Noctua tertia Mentzer & al., 1991
- Noctua tirrenica Biebinger, Speidel & Hanigk, 1983
- Nyctobrya muralis (Forster, 1771)
- Ochropleura leucogaster (Freyer, 1831)
- Ochropleura plecta (Linnaeus, 1761)
- Oligia latruncula (Denis & Schiffermüller, 1775)
- Oligia strigilis (Linnaeus, 1758)
- Omphalophana anatolica (Lederer, 1857)
- Omphalophana antirrhinii (Hübner, 1803)
- Opigena polygona (Denis & Schiffermüller, 1775)
- Oria musculosa (Hübner, 1808)
- Orthosia gothica (Linnaeus, 1758)
- Oxytripia orbiculosa (Esper, 1799)
- Pachetra sagittigera (Hufnagel, 1766)
- Panemeria tenebrata (Scopoli, 1763)
- Papestra biren (Goeze, 1781)
- Peridroma saucia (Hübner, 1808)
- Perigrapha rorida Frivaldszky, 1835
- Philareta treitschkei (Frivaldszky, 1835)
- Phlogophora meticulosa (Linnaeus, 1758)
- Phlogophora scita (Hübner, 1790)
- Phyllophila obliterata (Rambur, 1833)
- Plusia festucae (Linnaeus, 1758)
- Polymixis culoti (Schawerda, 1921)
- Polymixis rufocincta (Geyer, 1828)
- Polymixis serpentina (Treitschke, 1825)
- Polyphaenis sericata (Esper, 1787)
- Praestilbia armeniaca Staudinger, 1892
- Pyrrhia umbra (Hufnagel, 1766)
- Rhyacia simulans (Hufnagel, 1766)
- Schinia cardui (Hübner, 1790)
- Sesamia cretica Lederer, 1857
- Sesamia nonagrioides Lefebvre, 1827
- Sideridis reticulata (Goeze, 1781)
- Simyra dentinosa Freyer, 1838
- Spaelotis ravida (Denis & Schiffermüller, 1775)
- Spaelotis senna (Freyer, 1829)
- Spodoptera exigua (Hübner, 1808)
- Spodoptera littoralis (Boisduval, 1833)
- Standfussiana lucernea (Linnaeus, 1758)
- Subacronicta megacephala (Denis & Schiffermüller, 1775)
- Teinoptera olivina (Herrich-Schäffer, 1852)
- Thalpophila matura (Hufnagel, 1766)
- Tholera decimalis (Poda, 1761)
- Trachea atriplicis (Linnaeus, 1758)
- Trichoplusia ni (Hübner, 1803)
- Trigonophora flammea (Esper, 1785)
- Tyta luctuosa (Denis & Schiffermüller, 1775)
- Xanthodes albago (Fabricius, 1794)
- Xestia ashworthii (Doubleday, 1855)
- Xestia c-nigrum (Linnaeus, 1758)
- Xestia triangulum (Hufnagel, 1766)
- Xestia castanea (Esper, 1798)
- Xestia ochreago (Hübner, 1809)
- Xestia xanthographa (Denis & Schiffermüller, 1775)

=== Nolidae ===
- Bena bicolorana (Fuessly, 1775)
- Earias clorana (Linnaeus, 1761)
- Earias syriacana Bartel, 1903
- Nola squalida Staudinger, 1871
- Nycteola revayana (Scopoli, 1772)
- Nycteola siculana (Fuchs, 1899)
- Pseudoips prasinana (Linnaeus, 1758)

=== Notodontidae ===
- Cerura vinula (Linnaeus, 1758)
- Dicranura ulmi (Denis & Schiffermüller, 1775)
- Drymonia dodonaea (Denis & Schiffermüller, 1775)
- Drymonia querna (Denis & Schiffermüller, 1775)
- Drymonia ruficornis (Hufnagel, 1766)
- Furcula bifida (Brahm, 1787)
- Furcula furcula (Clerck, 1759)
- Harpyia milhauseri (Fabricius, 1775)
- Notodonta ziczac (Linnaeus, 1758)
- Peridea anceps (Goeze, 1781)
- Phalera bucephala (Linnaeus, 1758)
- Phalera bucephaloides (Ochsenheimer, 1810)
- Pheosia tremula (Clerck, 1759)
- Pterostoma palpina (Clerck, 1759)
- Ptilodon capucina (Linnaeus, 1758)
- Spatalia argentina (Denis & Schiffermüller, 1775)
- Thaumetopoea pityocampa (Denis & Schiffermüller, 1775)
- Thaumetopoea processionea (Linnaeus, 1758)
- Thaumetopoea solitaria (Freyer, 1838)

=== Oecophoridae ===
- Alabonia staintoniella (Zeller, 1850)
- Borkhausenia fuscescens (Haworth, 1828)
- Crassa unitella (Hübner, 1796)
- Endrosis sarcitrella (Linnaeus, 1758)
- Epicallima formosella (Denis & Schiffermüller, 1775)
- Fabiola pokornyi (Nickerl, 1864)
- Holoscolia homaima Gozmany, 1954
- Holoscolia huebneri Koçak, 1980
- Kasyniana diminutella (Rebel, 1931)
- Minetia labiosella (Hübner, 1810)
- Oecophora bractella (Linnaeus, 1758)
- Oecophora kindermanni (Herrich-Schäffer, 1854)
- Oecophora superior (Rebel, 1918)
- Pleurota aristella (Linnaeus, 1767)
- Pleurota bicostella (Clerck, 1759)
- Pleurota filigerella Mann, 1867
- Pleurota planella (Staudinger, 1859)
- Pleurota pungitiella Herrich-Schäffer, 1854
- Pleurota pyropella (Denis & Schiffermüller, 1775)
- Pleurota vittalba Staudinger, 1871
- Schiffermuelleria schaefferella (Linnaeus, 1758)

=== Opostegidae ===
- Pseudopostega crepusculella (Zeller, 1839)

=== Peleopodidae ===
- Carcina quercana (Fabricius, 1775)

=== Plutellidae ===
- Eidophasia syenitella Herrich-Schäffer, 1854
- Plutella xylostella (Linnaeus, 1758)
- Plutella porrectella (Linnaeus, 1758)
- Rhigognostis hufnagelii (Zeller, 1839)

=== Praydidae ===
- Prays fraxinella (Bjerkander, 1784)
- Prays oleae (Bernard, 1788)

=== Prodoxidae ===
- Lampronia rupella (Denis & Schiffermüller, 1775)

=== Psychidae ===
- Acanthopsyche zelleri (Mann, 1855)
- Apterona helicoidella (Vallot, 1827)
- Bijugis bombycella (Denis & Schiffermüller, 1775)
- Canephora hirsuta (Poda, 1761)
- Diplodoma laichartingella Goeze, 1783
- Eochorica balcanica (Rebel, 1919)
- Epichnopterix plumella (Denis & Schiffermüller, 1775)
- Eumasia parietariella (Heydenreich, 1851)
- Heliopsychidea graecella (Millière, 1866)
- Loebelia crassicornis (Staudinger, 1870)
- Megalophanes viciella (Denis & Schiffermüller, 1775)
- Montanima predotae Sieder, 1949
- Oiketicoides lutea (Staudinger, 1870)
- Pachythelia villosella (Ochsenheimer, 1810)
- Proutia betulina (Zeller, 1839)
- Pseudobankesia macedoniella (Rebel, 1919)
- Psyche casta (Pallas, 1767)
- Psyche crassiorella Bruand, 1851
- Psychidea nudella (Ochsenheimer, 1810)
- Ptilocephala plumifera (Ochsenheimer, 1810)
- Rebelia sapho (Millière, 1864)
- Rebelia surientella (Bruand, 1858)
- Sterrhopterix fusca (Haworth, 1809)
- Taleporia politella (Ochsenheimer, 1816)
- Taleporia tubulosa (Retzius, 1783)
- Typhonia ciliaris (Ochsenheimer, 1810)

=== Pterophoridae ===
- Agdistis bennetii (Curtis, 1833)
- Agdistis heydeni (Zeller, 1852)
- Agdistis meridionalis (Zeller, 1847)
- Agdistis satanas Millière, 1875
- Agdistis tamaricis (Zeller, 1847)
- Amblyptilia acanthadactyla (Hübner, 1813)
- Amblyptilia punctidactyla (Haworth, 1811)
- Buszkoiana capnodactylus (Zeller, 1841)
- Capperia celeusi (Frey, 1886)
- Cnaemidophorus rhododactyla (Denis & Schiffermüller, 1775)
- Crombrugghia distans (Zeller, 1847)
- Crombrugghia laetus (Zeller, 1847)
- Emmelina monodactyla (Linnaeus, 1758)
- Gillmeria ochrodactyla (Denis & Schiffermüller, 1775)
- Hellinsia carphodactyla (Hübner, 1813)
- Merrifieldia baliodactylus (Zeller, 1841)
- Merrifieldia leucodactyla (Denis & Schiffermüller, 1775)
- Merrifieldia malacodactylus (Zeller, 1847)
- Merrifieldia tridactyla (Linnaeus, 1758)
- Oxyptilus parvidactyla (Haworth, 1811)
- Paraplatyptilia metzneri (Zeller, 1841)
- Platyptilia farfarellus Zeller, 1867
- Pterophorus ischnodactyla (Treitschke, 1835)
- Pterophorus pentadactyla (Linnaeus, 1758)
- Stangeia siceliota (Zeller, 1847)
- Stenoptilia bipunctidactyla (Scopoli, 1763)
- Stenoptilia coprodactylus (Stainton, 1851)
- Stenoptilia graphodactyla (Treitschke, 1833)
- Stenoptilia lutescens (Herrich-Schäffer, 1855)
- Stenoptilia pterodactyla (Linnaeus, 1761)
- Stenoptilia stigmatodactylus (Zeller, 1852)
- Stenoptilia zophodactylus (Duponchel, 1840)

=== Pyralidae ===
- Acrobasis advenella (Zincken, 1818)
- Acrobasis dulcella (Zeller, 1848)
- Acrobasis marmorea (Haworth, 1811)
- Acrobasis obliqua (Zeller, 1847)
- Acrobasis sodalella Zeller, 1848
- Acrobasis suavella (Zincken, 1818)
- Acrobasis tumidana (Denis & Schiffermüller, 1775)
- Aglossa caprealis (Hübner, 1809)
- Aglossa pinguinalis (Linnaeus, 1758)
- Ancylosis cinnamomella (Duponchel, 1836)
- Ancylosis imitella Hampson, 1901
- Ancylosis oblitella (Zeller, 1848)
- Ancylosis roscidella (Eversmann, 1844)
- Ancylosis sareptalla (Herrich-Schäffer, 1861)
- Aphomia sociella (Linnaeus, 1758)
- Aphomia zelleri de Joannis, 1932
- Apomyelois ceratoniae (Zeller, 1839)
- Asarta aethiopella (Duponchel, 1837)
- Bradyrrhoa confiniella Zeller, 1848
- Bradyrrhoa gilveolella (Treitschke, 1832)
- Cadra cautella (Walker, 1863)
- Cadra figulilella (Gregson, 1871)
- Cadra furcatella (Herrich-Schäffer, 1849)
- Delplanqueia dilutella (Denis & Schiffermüller, 1775)
- Elegia similella (Zincken, 1818)
- Ematheudes punctella (Treitschke, 1833)
- Endotricha flammealis (Denis & Schiffermüller, 1775)
- Ephestia disparella Hampson, 1901
- Ephestia elutella (Hübner, 1796)
- Ephestia kuehniella Zeller, 1879
- Ephestia unicolorella Staudinger, 1881
- Ephestia welseriella (Zeller, 1848)
- Epischnia illotella Zeller, 1839
- Epischnia prodromella (Hübner, 1799)
- Episcythrastis tabidella (Mann, 1864)
- Etiella zinckenella (Treitschke, 1832)
- Eurhodope monogrammos (Zeller, 1867)
- Eurhodope rosella (Scopoli, 1763)
- Euzophera bigella (Zeller, 1848)
- Euzophera cinerosella (Zeller, 1839)
- Euzophera lunulella (O. Costa, 1836)
- Euzophera pinguis (Haworth, 1811)
- Euzopherodes charlottae (Rebel, 1914)
- Euzopherodes lutisignella (Mann, 1869)
- Euzopherodes vapidella (Mann, 1857)
- Gymnancyla canella (Denis & Schiffermüller, 1775)
- Gymnancyla hornigii (Lederer, 1852)
- Homoeosoma nebulella (Denis & Schiffermüller, 1775)
- Homoeosoma nimbella (Duponchel, 1837)
- Homoeosoma sinuella (Fabricius, 1794)
- Hypochalcia ahenella (Denis & Schiffermüller, 1775)
- Hypsopygia costalis (Fabricius, 1775)
- Hypsopygia fulvocilialis (Duponchel, 1834)
- Hypsopygia glaucinalis (Linnaeus, 1758)
- Hypsopygia rubidalis (Denis & Schiffermüller, 1775)
- Hypsotropa limbella Zeller, 1848
- Khorassania compositella (Treitschke, 1835)
- Merulempista cingillella (Zeller, 1846)
- Michaeliodes friesei Roesler, 1969
- Moitrelia obductella (Zeller, 1839)
- Myelois circumvoluta (Fourcroy, 1785)
- Pempelia alpigenella (Duponchel, 1836)
- Pempelia amoenella (Zeller, 1848)
- Pempelia palumbella (Denis & Schiffermüller, 1775)
- Pempeliella ornatella (Denis & Schiffermüller, 1775)
- Pempeliella sororiella Zeller, 1839
- Phycita coronatella (Guenée, 1845)
- Phycita meliella (Mann, 1864)
- Phycita roborella (Denis & Schiffermüller, 1775)
- Phycitodes albatella (Ragonot, 1887)
- Phycitodes binaevella (Hübner, 1813)
- Phycitodes inquinatella (Ragonot, 1887)
- Phycitodes lacteella (Rothschild, 1915)
- Plodia interpunctella (Hübner, 1813)
- Pterothrixidia rufella (Duponchel, 1836)
- Pyralis farinalis (Linnaeus, 1758)
- Pyralis regalis Denis & Schiffermüller, 1775
- Rhodophaea formosa (Haworth, 1811)
- Sciota hostilis (Stephens, 1834)
- Seeboldia korgosella Ragonot, 1887
- Selagia argyrella (Denis & Schiffermüller, 1775)
- Selagia spadicella (Hübner, 1796)
- Seleucia pectinella (Chretien, 1911)
- Stemmatophora combustalis (Fischer v. Röslerstamm, 1842)
- Stemmatophora honestalis (Treitschke, 1829)
- Synaphe antennalis (Fabricius, 1794)
- Synaphe moldavica (Esper, 1794)
- Synaphe punctalis (Fabricius, 1775)

=== Saturniidae ===
- Saturnia caecigena Kupido, 1825
- Saturnia pyri (Denis & Schiffermüller, 1775)

=== Scythrididae ===
- Scythris albidella (Stainton, 1867)
- Scythris albostriata Hannemann, 1961
- Scythris bubaniae Walsingham, 1907
- Scythris cicadella (Zeller, 1839)
- Scythris crassiuscula (Herrich-Schäffer, 1855)
- Scythris fallacella (Schlager, 1847)
- Scythris flavilaterella (Fuchs, 1886)
- Scythris flaviventrella (Herrich-Schäffer, 1855)
- Scythris gravatella (Zeller, 1847)
- Scythris laminella (Denis & Schiffermüller, 1775)
- Scythris limbella (Fabricius, 1775)
- Scythris moldavicella Caradja, 1905
- Scythris noricella (Zeller, 1843)
- Scythris obscurella (Scopoli, 1763)
- Scythris pascuella (Zeller, 1855)
- Scythris picaepennis (Haworth, 1828)
- Scythris punctivittella (O. Costa, 1836)
- Scythris scipionella (Staudinger, 1859)
- Scythris seliniella (Zeller, 1839)
- Scythris tabidella (Herrich-Schäffer, 1855)
- Scythris tergestinella (Zeller, 1855)
- Scythris tributella (Zeller, 1847)
- Scythris vittella (O. Costa, 1834)

=== Sesiidae ===
- Bembecia albanensis (Rebel, 1918)
- Bembecia ichneumoniformis (Denis & Schiffermüller, 1775)
- Bembecia megillaeformis (Hübner, 1813)
- Bembecia pavicevici Tosevski, 1989
- Bembecia uroceriformis (Treitschke, 1834)
- Chamaesphecia aerifrons (Zeller, 1847)
- Chamaesphecia alysoniformis (Herrich-Schäffer, 1846)
- Chamaesphecia annellata (Zeller, 1847)
- Chamaesphecia bibioniformis (Esper, 1800)
- Chamaesphecia chalciformis (Esper, 1804)
- Chamaesphecia doleriformis (Herrich-Schäffer, 1846)
- Chamaesphecia empiformis (Esper, 1783)
- Chamaesphecia euceraeformis (Ochsenheimer, 1816)
- Chamaesphecia masariformis (Ochsenheimer, 1808)
- Chamaesphecia proximata (Staudinger, 1891)
- Chamaesphecia schmidtiiformis (Freyer, 1836)
- Chamaesphecia tenthrediniformis (Denis & Schiffermüller, 1775)
- Paranthrene tabaniformis (Rottemburg, 1775)
- Pennisetia hylaeiformis (Laspeyres, 1801)
- Pyropteron affinis (Staudinger, 1856)
- Pyropteron leucomelaena (Zeller, 1847)
- Pyropteron minianiformis (Freyer, 1843)
- Pyropteron muscaeformis (Esper, 1783)
- Pyropteron triannuliformis (Freyer, 1843)
- Sesia apiformis (Clerck, 1759)
- Synanthedon andrenaeformis (Laspeyres, 1801)
- Synanthedon cephiformis (Ochsenheimer, 1808)
- Synanthedon conopiformis (Esper, 1782)
- Synanthedon culiciformis (Linnaeus, 1758)
- Synanthedon formicaeformis (Esper, 1783)
- Synanthedon loranthi (Kralicek, 1966)
- Synanthedon myopaeformis (Borkhausen, 1789)
- Synanthedon spheciformis (Denis & Schiffermüller, 1775)
- Synanthedon spuleri (Fuchs, 1908)
- Synanthedon stomoxiformis (Hübner, 1790)
- Synanthedon tipuliformis (Clerck, 1759)
- Synanthedon vespiformis (Linnaeus, 1761)
- Tinthia brosiformis (Hübner, 1813)
- Tinthia myrmosaeformis (Herrich-Schäffer, 1846)
- Tinthia tineiformis (Esper, 1789)

=== Sphingidae ===
- Acherontia atropos (Linnaeus, 1758)
- Agrius convolvuli (Linnaeus, 1758)
- Daphnis nerii (Linnaeus, 1758)
- Deilephila elpenor (Linnaeus, 1758)
- Deilephila porcellus (Linnaeus, 1758)
- Hemaris croatica (Esper, 1800)
- Hippotion celerio (Linnaeus, 1758)
- Hyles euphorbiae (Linnaeus, 1758)
- Hyles livornica (Esper, 1780)
- Hyles nicaea (de Prunner, 1798)
- Hyles vespertilio (Esper, 1780)
- Laothoe populi (Linnaeus, 1758)
- Macroglossum stellatarum (Linnaeus, 1758)
- Marumba quercus (Denis & Schiffermüller, 1775)
- Proserpinus proserpina (Pallas, 1772)
- Rethera komarovi (Christoph, 1885)
- Smerinthus ocellata (Linnaeus, 1758)
- Sphingoneopsis gorgoniades (Hübner, 1819)
- Sphinx ligustri Linnaeus, 1758
- Sphinx pinastri Linnaeus, 1758

=== Tineidae ===
- Cephimallota angusticostella (Zeller, 1839)
- Crassicornella crassicornella (Zeller, 1847)
- Eudarcia granulatella (Zeller, 1852)
- Eudarcia kasyi (Petersen, 1971)
- Euplocamus anthracinalis (Scopoli, 1763)
- Euplocamus ophisus (Cramer, 1779)
- Infurcitinea albanica Petersen, 1963
- Infurcitinea albicomella (Stainton, 1851)
- Infurcitinea banatica Petersen, 1961
- Monopis imella (Hübner, 1813)
- Monopis laevigella (Denis & Schiffermüller, 1775)
- Monopis obviella (Denis & Schiffermüller, 1775)
- Morophaga choragella (Denis & Schiffermüller, 1775)
- Nemapogon clematella (Fabricius, 1781)
- Nemapogon cloacella (Haworth, 1828)
- Nemapogon ruricolella (Stainton, 1849)
- Nemapogon signatellus Petersen, 1957
- Nemapogon variatella (Clemens, 1859)
- Neurothaumasia ankerella (Mann, 1867)
- Niditinea fuscella (Linnaeus, 1758)
- Novotinea klimeschi (Rebel, 1940)
- Reisserita relicinella (Herrich-Schäffer, 1853)
- Tinea basifasciella Ragonot, 1895
- Tinea translucens Meyrick, 1917
- Tinea trinotella Thunberg, 1794
- Triaxomasia caprimulgella (Stainton, 1851)
- Triaxomera parasitella (Hübner, 1796)
- Trichophaga tapetzella (Linnaeus, 1758)

=== Tischeriidae ===
- Coptotriche marginea (Haworth, 1828)
- Tischeria ekebladella (Bjerkander, 1795)

=== Tortricidae ===
- Acleris bergmanniana (Linnaeus, 1758)
- Acleris forsskaleana (Linnaeus, 1758)
- Acleris holmiana (Linnaeus, 1758)
- Acleris literana (Linnaeus, 1758)
- Acleris quercinana (Zeller, 1849)
- Acleris variegana (Denis & Schiffermüller, 1775)
- Aethes bilbaensis (Rossler, 1877)
- Aethes flagellana (Duponchel, 1836)
- Aethes hartmanniana (Clerck, 1759)
- Aethes margaritana (Haworth, 1811)
- Aethes margarotana (Duponchel, 1836)
- Aethes moribundana (Staudinger, 1859)
- Aethes nefandana (Kennel, 1899)
- Aethes rutilana (Hübner, 1817)
- Aethes smeathmanniana (Fabricius, 1781)
- Aethes tesserana (Denis & Schiffermüller, 1775)
- Aethes triangulana (Treitschke, 1835)
- Aethes williana (Brahm, 1791)
- Agapeta hamana (Linnaeus, 1758)
- Agapeta largana (Rebel, 1906)
- Agapeta zoegana (Linnaeus, 1767)
- Aleimma loeflingiana (Linnaeus, 1758)
- Ancylis achatana (Denis & Schiffermüller, 1775)
- Ancylis apicella (Denis & Schiffermüller, 1775)
- Ancylis comptana (Frölich, 1828)
- Ancylis tineana (Hübner, 1799)
- Ancylis unguicella (Linnaeus, 1758)
- Aphelia viburniana (Denis & Schiffermüller, 1775)
- Aphelia ferugana (Hübner, 1793)
- Archips podana (Scopoli, 1763)
- Archips rosana (Linnaeus, 1758)
- Archips xylosteana (Linnaeus, 1758)
- Bactra furfurana (Haworth, 1811)
- Bactra lancealana (Hübner, 1799)
- Bactra robustana (Christoph, 1872)
- Cacoecimorpha pronubana (Hübner, 1799)
- Celypha cespitana (Hübner, 1817)
- Celypha lacunana (Denis & Schiffermüller, 1775)
- Celypha rivulana (Scopoli, 1763)
- Celypha rufana (Scopoli, 1763)
- Celypha striana (Denis & Schiffermüller, 1775)
- Choristoneura hebenstreitella (Müller, 1764)
- Choristoneura murinana (Hübner, 1799)
- Clepsis balcanica (Rebel, 1917)
- Clepsis consimilana (Hübner, 1817)
- Clepsis pallidana (Fabricius, 1776)
- Clepsis senecionana (Hübner, 1819)
- Cnephasia alticolana (Herrich-Schäffer, 1851)
- Cnephasia asseclana (Denis & Schiffermüller, 1775)
- Cnephasia communana (Herrich-Schäffer, 1851)
- Cnephasia cupressivorana (Staudinger, 1871)
- Cnephasia pasiuana (Hübner, 1799)
- Cnephasia stephensiana (Doubleday, 1849)
- Cnephasia abrasana (Duponchel, 1843)
- Cnephasia incertana (Treitschke, 1835)
- Cochylidia heydeniana (Herrich-Schäffer, 1851)
- Cochylidia implicitana (Wocke, 1856)
- Cochylidia subroseana (Haworth, 1811)
- Cochylimorpha meridiana (Staudinger, 1859)
- Cochylimorpha straminea (Haworth, 1811)
- Cochylis epilinana Duponchel, 1842
- Cochylis pallidana Zeller, 1847
- Cochylis posterana Zeller, 1847
- Crocidosema plebejana Zeller, 1847
- Cydia conicolana (Heylaerts, 1874)
- Cydia duplicana (Zetterstedt, 1839)
- Cydia fagiglandana (Zeller, 1841)
- Cydia pactolana (Zeller, 1840)
- Cydia pomonella (Linnaeus, 1758)
- Cydia pyrivora (Danilevsky, 1947)
- Cydia succedana (Denis & Schiffermüller, 1775)
- Diceratura ostrinana (Guenée, 1845)
- Dichrorampha alpinana (Treitschke, 1830)
- Dichrorampha cinerosana (Herrich-Schäffer, 1851)
- Dichrorampha eximia (Danilevsky, 1948)
- Dichrorampha gruneriana (Herrich-Schäffer, 1851)
- Dichrorampha heegerana (Duponchel, 1843)
- Dichrorampha plumbana (Scopoli, 1763)
- Dichrorampha rilana Drenowski, 1909
- Eana incanana (Stephens, 1852)
- Eana italica (Obraztsov, 1950)
- Eana penziana (Thunberg, 1791)
- Eana argentana (Clerck, 1759)
- Eana canescana (Guenée, 1845)
- Enarmonia formosana (Scopoli, 1763)
- Endothenia gentianaeana (Hübner, 1799)
- Endothenia lapideana (Herrich-Schäffer, 1851)
- Endothenia marginana (Haworth, 1811)
- Endothenia nigricostana (Haworth, 1811)
- Endothenia quadrimaculana (Haworth, 1811)
- Epagoge grotiana (Fabricius, 1781)
- Epiblema chretieni Obraztsov, 1952
- Epiblema cnicicolana (Zeller, 1847)
- Epiblema graphana (Treitschke, 1835)
- Epiblema hepaticana (Treitschke, 1835)
- Epiblema inulivora (Meyrick, 1932)
- Epiblema mendiculana (Treitschke, 1835)
- Epiblema scutulana (Denis & Schiffermüller, 1775)
- Epiblema similana (Denis & Schiffermüller, 1775)
- Epiblema sticticana (Fabricius, 1794)
- Epiblema turbidana (Treitschke, 1835)
- Epinotia abbreviana (Fabricius, 1794)
- Epinotia cruciana (Linnaeus, 1761)
- Epinotia festivana (Hübner, 1799)
- Epinotia tedella (Clerck, 1759)
- Epinotia tetraquetrana (Haworth, 1811)
- Epinotia thapsiana (Zeller, 1847)
- Eucosma albidulana (Herrich-Schäffer, 1851)
- Eucosma cana (Haworth, 1811)
- Eucosma conformana (Mann, 1872)
- Eucosma conterminana (Guenée, 1845)
- Eucosma cretaceana (Kennel, 1899)
- Eudemis profundana (Denis & Schiffermüller, 1775)
- Eulia ministrana (Linnaeus, 1758)
- Eupoecilia ambiguella (Hübner, 1796)
- Eupoecilia angustana (Hübner, 1799)
- Falseuncaria ruficiliana (Haworth, 1811)
- Grapholita funebrana Treitschke, 1835
- Grapholita caecana Schlager, 1847
- Grapholita coronillana Lienig & Zeller, 1846
- Grapholita discretana Wocke, 1861
- Grapholita fissana (Frölich, 1828)
- Grapholita gemmiferana Treitschke, 1835
- Grapholita lathyrana (Hübner, 1822)
- Grapholita lunulana (Denis & Schiffermüller, 1775)
- Grapholita nebritana Treitschke, 1830
- Gynnidomorpha minimana (Caradja, 1916)
- Gypsonoma aceriana (Duponchel, 1843)
- Hedya nubiferana (Haworth, 1811)
- Hedya pruniana (Hübner, 1799)
- Hedya salicella (Linnaeus, 1758)
- Isotrias hybridana (Hübner, 1817)
- Lathronympha strigana (Fabricius, 1775)
- Lobesia bicinctana (Duponchel, 1844)
- Lobesia quaggana Mann, 1855
- Neosphaleroptera nubilana (Hübner, 1799)
- Notocelia cynosbatella (Linnaeus, 1758)
- Notocelia incarnatana (Hübner, 1800)
- Notocelia roborana (Denis & Schiffermüller, 1775)
- Notocelia tetragonana (Stephens, 1834)
- Notocelia trimaculana (Haworth, 1811)
- Notocelia uddmanniana (Linnaeus, 1758)
- Olethreutes arcuella (Clerck, 1759)
- Orthotaenia undulana (Denis & Schiffermüller, 1775)
- Pammene albuginana (Guenée, 1845)
- Pammene obscurana (Stephens, 1834)
- Pammene rhediella (Clerck, 1759)
- Pandemis cerasana (Hübner, 1786)
- Pandemis heparana (Denis & Schiffermüller, 1775)
- Paramesia gnomana (Clerck, 1759)
- Pelochrista caecimaculana (Hübner, 1799)
- Pelochrista fusculana (Zeller, 1847)
- Pelochrista modicana (Zeller, 1847)
- Phalonidia affinitana (Douglas, 1846)
- Phalonidia contractana (Zeller, 1847)
- Phalonidia manniana (Fischer v. Röslerstamm, 1839)
- Phiaris stibiana (Guenée, 1845)
- Phiaris umbrosana (Freyer, 1842)
- Phtheochroa drenowskyi (Rebel, 1916)
- Phtheochroa duponchelana (Duponchel, 1843)
- Phtheochroa frigidana (Guenée, 1845)
- Phtheochroa fulvicinctana (Constant, 1893)
- Phtheochroa inopiana (Haworth, 1811)
- Prochlidonia amiantana (Hübner, 1799)
- Propiromorpha rhodophana (Herrich-Schäffer, 1851)
- Pseudargyrotoza conwagana (Fabricius, 1775)
- Pseudococcyx tessulatana (Staudinger, 1871)
- Ptycholoma lecheana (Linnaeus, 1758)
- Sparganothis pilleriana (Denis & Schiffermüller, 1775)
- Spilonota ocellana (Denis & Schiffermüller, 1775)
- Thiodia citrana (Hübner, 1799)
- Thiodia trochilana (Frölich, 1828)
- Tortrix viridana Linnaeus, 1758
- Zeiraphera griseana (Hübner, 1799)
- Zeiraphera isertana (Fabricius, 1794)

=== Yponomeutidae ===
- Kessleria albanica Friese, 1960
- Kessleria alpicella (Stainton, 1851)
- Kessleria mixta Huemer & Tarmann, 1992
- Paraswammerdamia albicapitella (Scharfenberg, 1805)
- Paraswammerdamia nebulella (Goeze, 1783)
- Scythropia crataegella (Linnaeus, 1767)
- Swammerdamia caesiella (Hübner, 1796)
- Swammerdamia compunctella Herrich-Schäffer, 1855
- Yponomeuta cagnagella (Hübner, 1813)
- Yponomeuta malinellus Zeller, 1838
- Yponomeuta padella (Linnaeus, 1758)
- Yponomeuta plumbella (Denis & Schiffermüller, 1775)

=== Ypsolophidae ===
- Ochsenheimeria taurella (Denis & Schiffermüller, 1775)
- Ypsolopha albiramella (Mann, 1861)
- Ypsolopha alpella (Denis & Schiffermüller, 1775)
- Ypsolopha chazariella (Mann, 1866)
- Ypsolopha falcella (Denis & Schiffermüller, 1775)
- Ypsolopha lucella (Fabricius, 1775)
- Ypsolopha minotaurella (Rebel, 1916)
- Ypsolopha mucronella (Scopoli, 1763)
- Ypsolopha nemorella (Linnaeus, 1758)
- Ypsolopha sylvella (Linnaeus, 1767)
- Ypsolopha ustella (Clerck, 1759)

=== Zygaenidae ===
- Adscita albanica (Naufock, 1926)
- Adscita geryon (Hübner, 1813)
- Adscita obscura (Zeller, 1847)
- Adscita statices (Linnaeus, 1758)
- Adscita mannii (Lederer, 1853)
- Jordanita chloros (Hübner, 1813)
- Jordanita globulariae (Hübner, 1793)
- Jordanita graeca (Jordan, 1907)
- Jordanita subsolana (Staudinger, 1862)
- Jordanita budensis (Ad. & Au. Speyer, 1858)
- Jordanita notata (Zeller, 1847)
- Rhagades pruni (Denis & Schiffermüller, 1775)
- Theresimima ampellophaga (Bayle-Barelle, 1808)
- Zygaena carniolica (Scopoli, 1763)
- Zygaena brizae (Esper, 1800)
- Zygaena laeta (Hübner, 1790)
- Zygaena minos (Denis & Schiffermüller, 1775)
- Zygaena punctum Ochsenheimer, 1808
- Zygaena purpuralis (Brunnich, 1763)
- Zygaena angelicae Ochsenheimer, 1808
- Zygaena ephialtes (Linnaeus, 1767)
- Zygaena exulans (Hohenwarth, 1792)
- Zygaena filipendulae (Linnaeus, 1758)
- Zygaena lonicerae (Scheven, 1777)
- Zygaena loti (Denis & Schiffermüller, 1775)
- Zygaena osterodensis Reiss, 1921
- Zygaena viciae (Denis & Schiffermüller, 1775)
