= Coleophora coarctataephaga =

Scientific classification
- Kingdom: Animalia
- Phylum: Arthropoda
- Class: Insecta
- Order: Lepidoptera
- Family: Coleophoridae
- Genus: Coleophora
- Species: C. coarctataephaga

Binomial name
- Coleophora coarctataephaga Toll, 1961

Synonyms
- Coleophora balcanica Baldizzone, 1994

Species of moth

Coleophora coarctataephaga is a moth of the family Coleophoridae. It is found in Romania, Bulgaria, North Macedonia, Albania and Greece.

The larvae feed on the leaves of Achillea coarctata.
