= Scoparia manifestella =

Scientific classification
- Kingdom: Animalia
- Phylum: Arthropoda
- Class: Insecta
- Order: Lepidoptera
- Family: Crambidae
- Genus: Scoparia
- Species: S. manifestella

Binomial name
- Scoparia manifestella (Herrich-Schaffer, 1848)

Synonyms
- Eudorea manifestella Herrich-Schaffer, 1848; Scoparia manifestalis Guenée, 1854; Scoparia manifestella f. fasciata Turati, 1919; Scoparia manifestella f. ticinensis Müller-Rutz, 1920; Scoparia manifestella lasercella Thurner, 1958; Scoparia marioni Viette, 1965

Species of moth

Scoparia manifestella is a species of moth in the family Crambidae. It is found in France, Italy, Austria, Switzerland, Germany and on the Balkan Peninsula.

The wingspan is about 23 mm.
