= Coleophora soffneriella =

Scientific classification
- Kingdom: Animalia
- Phylum: Arthropoda
- Class: Insecta
- Order: Lepidoptera
- Family: Coleophoridae
- Genus: Coleophora
- Species: C. soffneriella

Binomial name
- Coleophora soffneriella Toll, 1961

Species of moth

Coleophora soffneriella is a moth of the family Coleophoridae. It is found in Italy, Croatia, Albania, Greece, Crete and Bulgaria.

The larvae possibly feed on Juncus. They feed on the generative organs of their host plant.
