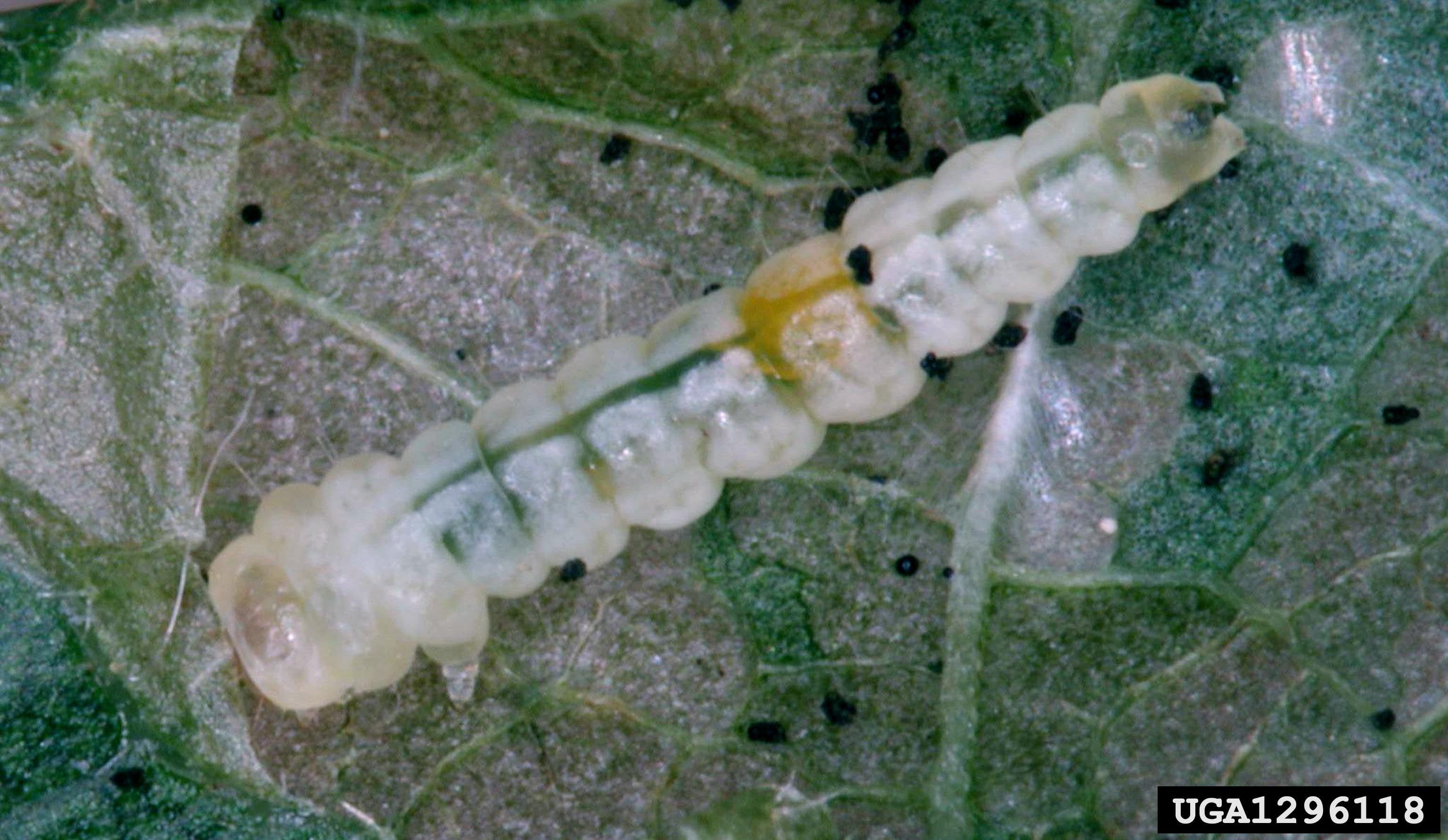
- Larva

Scientific classification
- Domain: Eukaryota
- Kingdom: Animalia
- Phylum: Arthropoda
- Class: Insecta
- Order: Lepidoptera
- Family: Gracillariidae
- Genus: Phyllonorycter
- Species: P. abrasella

Binomial name
- Phyllonorycter abrasella (Duponchel, 1843)

Synonyms
- Elachista abrasella Duponchel, 1843

= Phyllonorycter abrasella =

Species of moth

Phyllonorycter abrasella is a moth of the family Gracillariidae. It is found from the Czech Republic and Slovakia to France, Italy and Greece. There is a disjunct population in southern Russia.

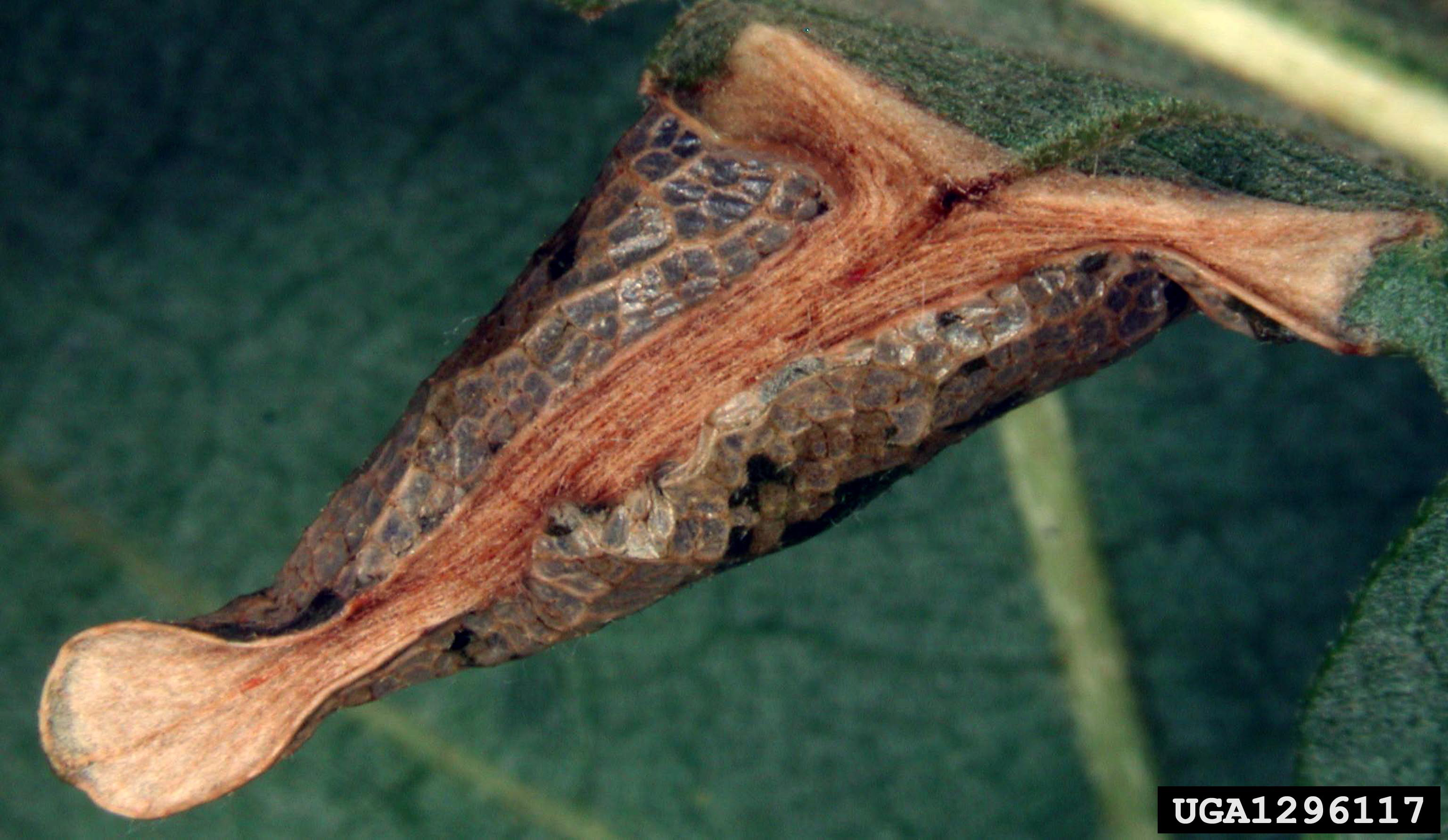
Larval feeding signs

The larvae feed on Quercus cerris. They mine the leaves of their host plant.
