= Acrobasis dulcella =

Scientific classification
- Kingdom: Animalia
- Phylum: Arthropoda
- Clade: Pancrustacea
- Class: Insecta
- Order: Lepidoptera
- Family: Pyralidae
- Genus: Acrobasis
- Species: A. dulcella

Binomial name
- Acrobasis dulcella (Zeller, 1848)

Synonyms
- Myelois dulcella Zeller, 1848; Acrobasis dulcella anatolica Caradja, 1910; Rhodophaea persella Zerny, 1939

Species of moth

Acrobasis dulcella is a species of snout moth in the genus Acrobasis. It was described by Zeller in 1848. It is found in most of Europe, except the north.
