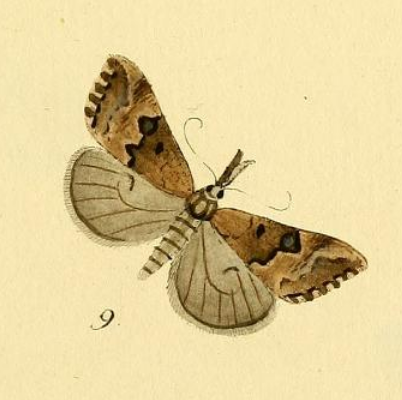

Scientific classification
- Kingdom: Animalia
- Phylum: Arthropoda
- Clade: Pancrustacea
- Class: Insecta
- Order: Lepidoptera
- Superfamily: Noctuoidea
- Family: Erebidae
- Genus: Hypena
- Species: H. palpalis

Binomial name
- Hypena palpalis Hübner, 1796

Synonyms
- Pyralis palpalis (Hübner, 1796); Hypena extensalis (Guenée, 1854); Hypena armenialis (Staudinger, 1901)

= Hypena palpalis =

Species of moth

Hypena palpalis is a moth in the family Erebidae. It was first described by Jacob Hübner in 1793. It has been observed in Southeastern Europe, Bulgaria, Ukraine, Turkey and Armenia.

== Bibliography ==
- Millière, P. (10 November 1875). Catalogue Raisonné des Lepidoptères des Alpes-Maritimes (PDF).
