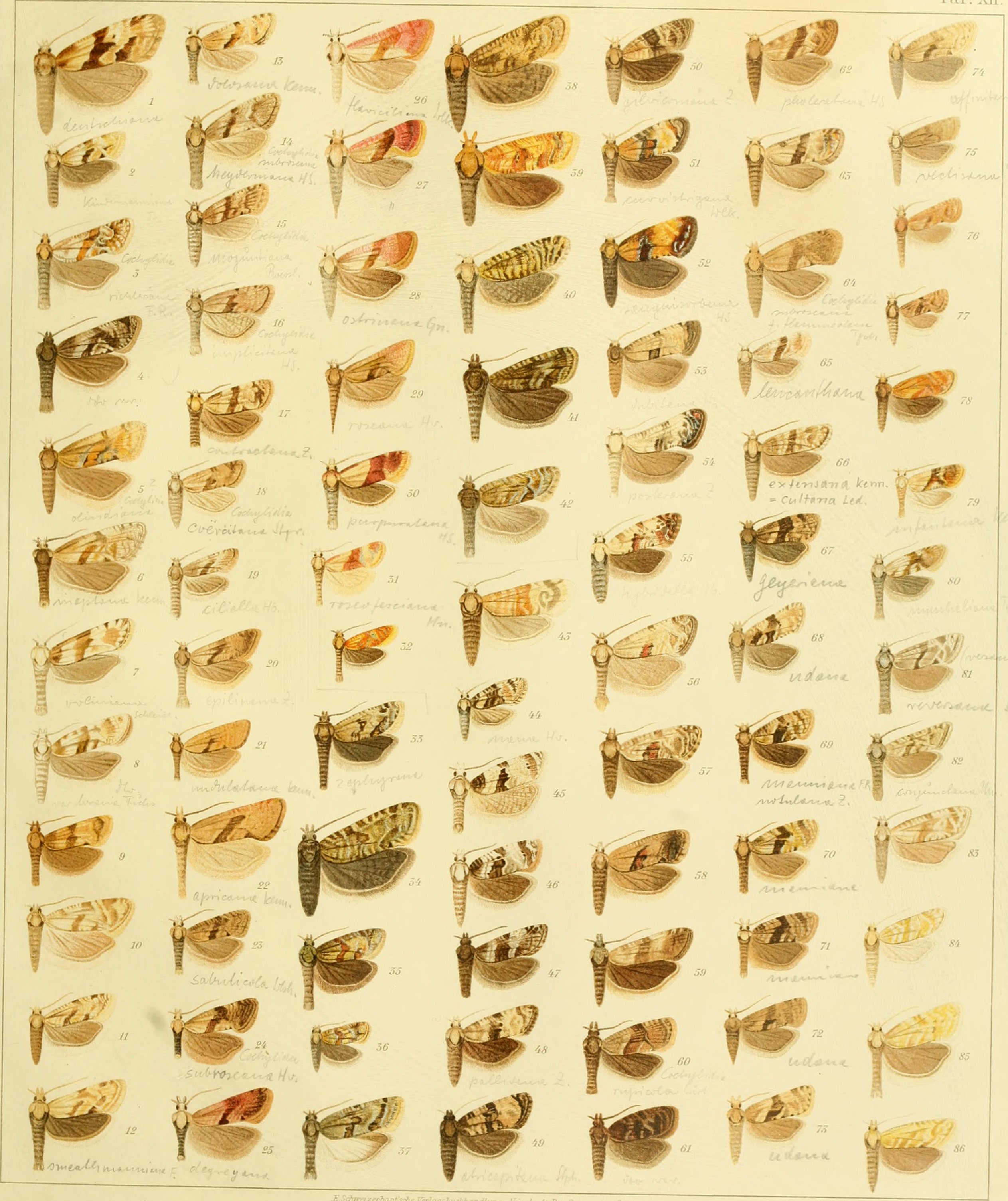
- in Kennel Die palaearktischen tortriciden figures 10, 86

Scientific classification
- Domain: Eukaryota
- Kingdom: Animalia
- Phylum: Arthropoda
- Class: Insecta
- Order: Lepidoptera
- Family: Tortricidae
- Genus: Aethes
- Species: A. moribundana

Binomial name
- Aethes moribundana (Staudinger, 1859)

Synonyms
- Cochylis moribundana Staudinger, 1859; Conchylis dilutana Kennel, 1899; Cochylis dispersana Kennel, 1899; Conchylis helvolana Kennel, 1900; Phalonia lanceolata Filipjev, 1924; Aethes modica Razowski, 1970; Phalonia prodilutana Kennel, 1913; Cochylis respirantana Staudinger, 1880

= Aethes moribundana =

Species of moth

Aethes moribundana is a species of moth of the family Tortricidae. It was described by Staudinger in 1859. It is found in southern and eastern Europe, Algeria, Asia Minor, Iran, Afghanistan, Central Asia, Mongolia and China (Hebei, Inner Mongolia, Qinghai, Xinjiang).

The wingspan is 15–21 millimetres (0.59–0.83 in). Adults are on wing in May and from July to August.

The larvae feed on Sideritis taurica.
