= Ethmia haemorrhoidella =

Scientific classification
- Kingdom: Animalia
- Phylum: Arthropoda
- Class: Insecta
- Order: Lepidoptera
- Family: Depressariidae
- Genus: Ethmia
- Species: E. haemorrhoidella

Binomial name
- Ethmia haemorrhoidella (Eversmann, 1844)

Synonyms
- Ypomeneuta haemorrhoidella Eversmann, 1844; Ethmia anatolica Amsel, 1953

Species of moth

Ethmia haemorrhoidella is a moth in the family Depressariidae. It is found in Asia Minor, southern Russia, the Caucasus, Italy, Austria, Hungary, Slovakia, Romania, Bulgaria, Albania, North Macedonia and Greece.
