= Coleophora variicornis =

Scientific classification
- Kingdom: Animalia
- Phylum: Arthropoda
- Class: Insecta
- Order: Lepidoptera
- Family: Coleophoridae
- Genus: Coleophora
- Species: C. variicornis

Binomial name
- Coleophora variicornis Toll, 1952

Species of moth

Coleophora variicornis is a moth of the family Coleophoridae. It is found from Germany to Italy and from France to Greece.

The length of the forewings is 5.5-6.5 mm for males and 4.5–5 mm for females. Adults have been found on Melilotus officinalis.

The larvae feed on Trifolium pratense.
