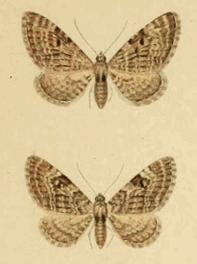

Scientific classification
- Domain: Eukaryota
- Kingdom: Animalia
- Phylum: Arthropoda
- Class: Insecta
- Order: Lepidoptera
- Family: Geometridae
- Genus: Eupithecia
- Species: E. druentiata

Binomial name
- Eupithecia druentiata Dietze, 1902

= Eupithecia druentiata =

Species of moth

Eupithecia druentiata is a moth in the family Geometridae. It is found in France, Spain, Italy, Austria, Slovenia and most of the Balkan Peninsula.

The wingspan is about 20–22 mm.

The larvae feed on Artemisia alba.

== Gallery ==
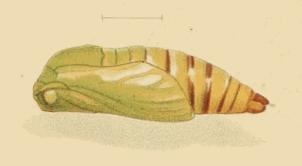
Pupa

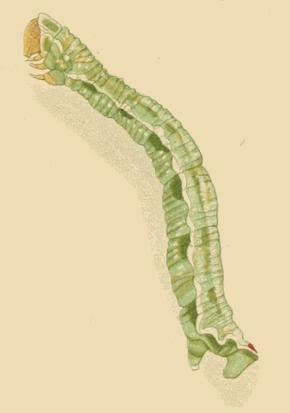
Larva

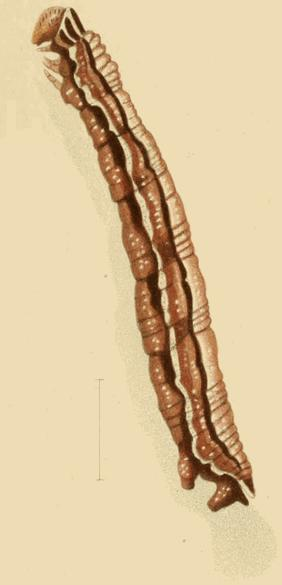
Larva

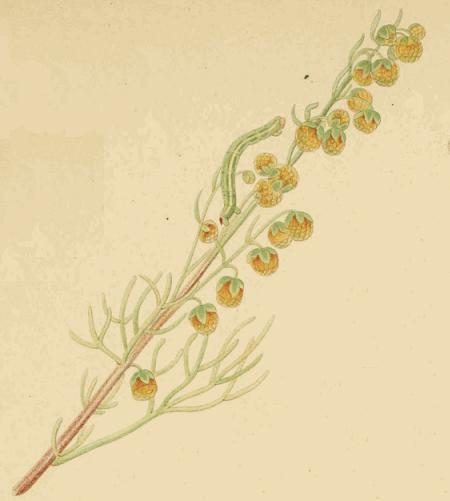
Larva on host plant
