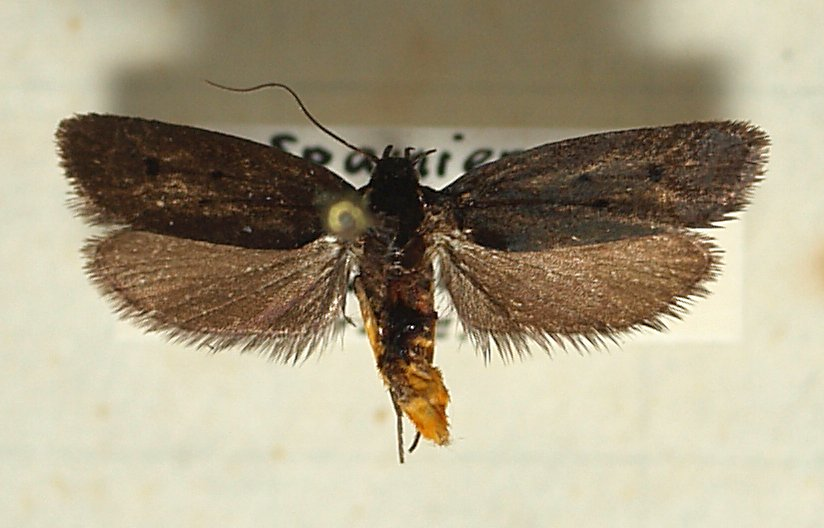

Scientific classification
- Kingdom: Animalia
- Phylum: Arthropoda
- Clade: Pancrustacea
- Class: Insecta
- Order: Lepidoptera
- Family: Depressariidae
- Genus: Ethmia
- Species: E. chrysopyga

Binomial name
- Ethmia chrysopyga (Zeller, 1844)

Synonyms
- Psecadia chrysopyga Zeller, 1844; Ethmia callidella Walshingham, 1910; Ethmia staudingeri (Rebel, 1901); Psecadia staudingeri Rebel, 1901; Psecadia andalusica Staudinger, 1880

= Ethmia chrysopyga =

Species of moth

Ethmia chrysopyga is a moth of the family Depressariidae. It is found in southern Europe and Anatolia up to the Caucasus region.

The wingspan is about 19 mm (0.75 in). The forewings are dull black, with three intensely black spots, the first two situated very lightly before the middle, one on the middle of the fold, one on the cell directly above it, and the third slightly larger spot at the upper angle of the cell. The hindwings are sooty black and a little paler than the forewings.

== Subspecies ==
- Ethmia chrysopyga chrysopyga (western Europe)
- Ethmia chrysopyga andalusica (Staudinger, 1880) (Spain, Portugal)
- Ethmia chrysopyga staudingeri (Rebel, 1901) (Asia Minor)
