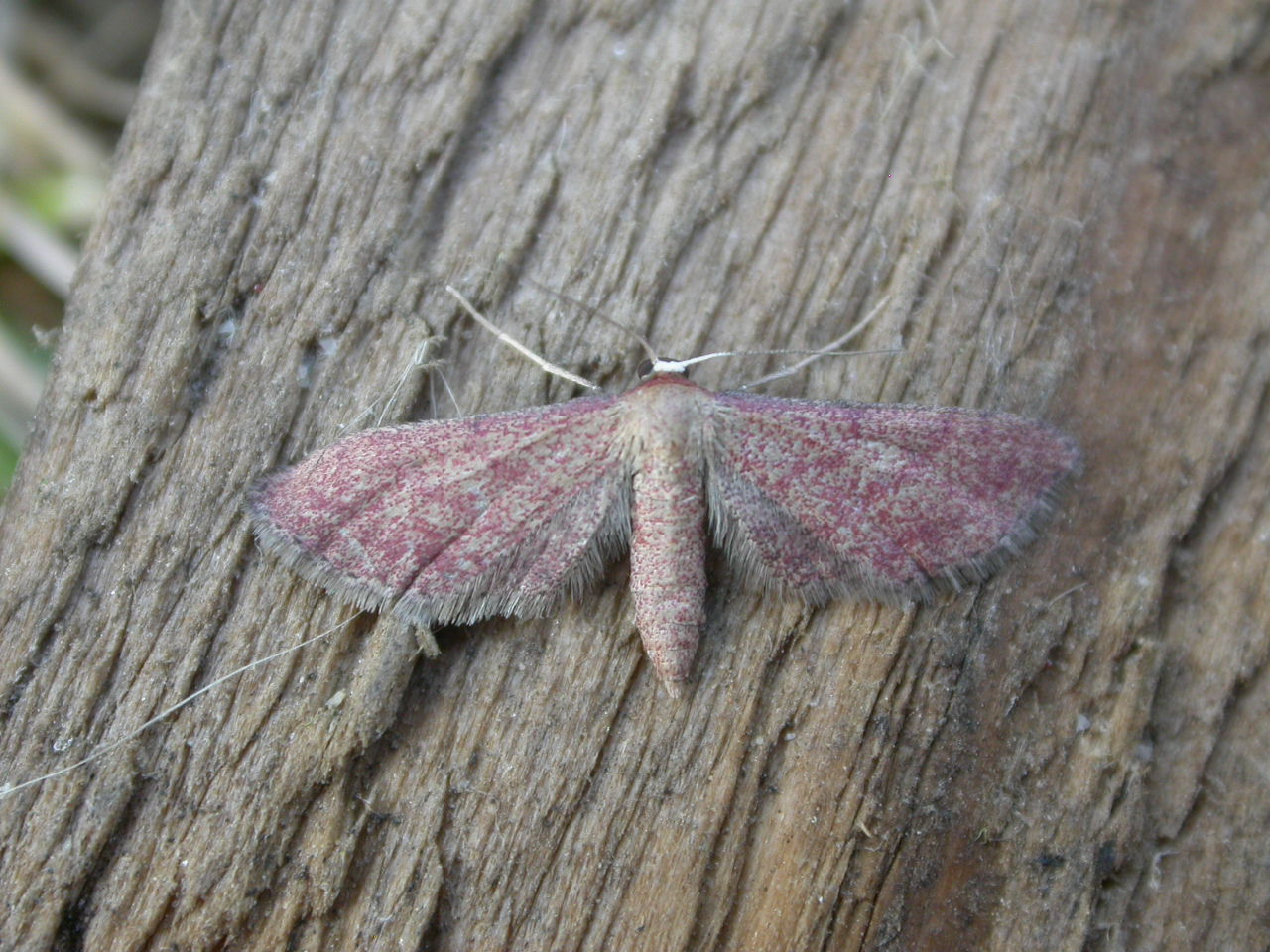

Scientific classification
- Kingdom: Animalia
- Phylum: Arthropoda
- Clade: Pancrustacea
- Class: Insecta
- Order: Lepidoptera
- Family: Geometridae
- Genus: Idaea
- Species: I. infirmaria

Binomial name
- Idaea infirmaria (Rambur, 1833)

= Idaea infirmaria =

Species of moth

Idaea infirmaria is a moth of the family Geometridae. It is found in Southern Europe.
