= Coleophora insulicola =

Scientific classification
- Kingdom: Animalia
- Phylum: Arthropoda
- Class: Insecta
- Order: Lepidoptera
- Family: Coleophoridae
- Genus: Coleophora
- Species: C. insulicola

Binomial name
- Coleophora insulicola Toll, 1942

Species of moth

Coleophora insulicola is a moth of the family Coleophoridae. It is found in France, Italy, Croatia, Albania and on Sicily, Sardinia and the Iberian Peninsula.
