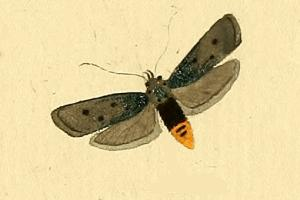

Scientific classification
- Kingdom: Animalia
- Phylum: Arthropoda
- Clade: Pancrustacea
- Class: Insecta
- Order: Lepidoptera
- Family: Depressariidae
- Genus: Ethmia
- Species: E. aurifluella

Binomial name
- Ethmia aurifluella (Hubner, 1810)

Synonyms
- Tinea aurifluella Hubner, 1810; Psecadia albarracinella Ragonot 1882; Ethmia cambyces Wiltshire 1947; Psecadia helvetica Muller-Rutz 1922

= Ethmia aurifluella =

Species of moth

Ethmia aurifluella is a moth in the family Depressariidae. It is found in Morocco, Asia Minor, Syria, Iran, the Iberian Peninsula, France, Switzerland, Austria, Italy, Albania, North Macedonia, Bulgaria, Greece, Turkey, Romania, Ukraine and southern Russia.

The wingspan is about 12 mm (0.47 in).

The larvae feed on Thalictrum and Anchusa species.
