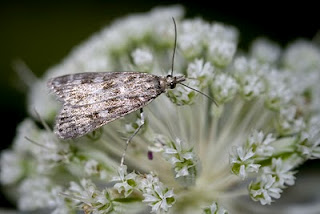

Scientific classification
- Kingdom: Animalia
- Phylum: Arthropoda
- Class: Insecta
- Order: Lepidoptera
- Family: Crambidae
- Genus: Eudonia
- Species: E. petrophila

Binomial name
- Eudonia petrophila (Standfuss, 1848)

Synonyms
- Eudorea petrophila Standfuss, 1848; Eudorea petrophila confusella La Harpe, 1863; Eudonia petrophila f. alterna P. Leraut, 1984; Eudonia petrophila reali P. Leraut, 1984; Scoparia amissella Millière, 1864; Scoparia vesuntialis Guenée, 1854

= Eudonia petrophila =

Species of moth

Eudonia petrophila is a species of moth in the family Crambidae. It is found in Spain, France, Italy, Switzerland, Austria, Germany, Poland, the Czech Republic, Slovakia, Bosnia and Herzegovina, Serbia and Montenegro, Romania, Albania and the Republic of Macedonia.
