= Ethmia flavianella =

Scientific classification
- Domain: Eukaryota
- Kingdom: Animalia
- Phylum: Arthropoda
- Class: Insecta
- Order: Lepidoptera
- Family: Depressariidae
- Genus: Ethmia
- Species: E. flavianella

Binomial name
- Ethmia flavianella (Treitschke, 1832)

Synonyms
- Yponomeuta flavianella Treitschke, 1832

Species of moth

Ethmia flavianella is a moth in the family Depressariidae. It is found in France, Italy, Slovenia, Albania and North Macedonia.

The larvae have been recorded feeding on Thalictrum species, including Thalictrum foetidum.
