= Caloptilia rhodinella =

Scientific classification
- Domain: Eukaryota
- Kingdom: Animalia
- Phylum: Arthropoda
- Class: Insecta
- Order: Lepidoptera
- Family: Gracillariidae
- Genus: Caloptilia
- Species: C. rhodinella

Binomial name
- Caloptilia rhodinella (Herrich-Schäffer, 1855)

Synonyms
- Gracilaria rhodinella Herrich-Schäffer, 1855

Species of moth

Caloptilia rhodinella is a moth of the family Gracillariidae. It is known from Albania, Austria, Croatia, Germany, Hungary, Italy, Romania, Serbia, Switzerland, Turkey, the European part of Russia, India and China (Sichuan).

The larvae feed on Quercus species, including Quercus robur.
