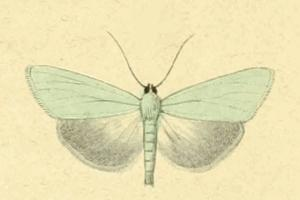

Scientific classification
- Domain: Eukaryota
- Kingdom: Animalia
- Phylum: Arthropoda
- Class: Insecta
- Order: Lepidoptera
- Family: Crambidae
- Genus: Udea
- Species: U. rhododendronalis

Binomial name
- Udea rhododendronalis (Duponchel, 1834)

Synonyms
- Botys rhododendronalis Duponchel, 1834; Udea rhododendronalis luquetalis P. Leraut, 1996; Udea rhododendronalis ventosalis P. Leraut, 1996

= Udea rhododendronalis =

Species of moth

Udea rhododendronalis is a species of moth in the family Crambidae. It is found in France, Spain, Italy, Switzerland, Austria, Serbia and Montenegro, the Republic of Macedonia, Bulgaria, Greece, Albania and Turkey.
