= Eupithecia cuculliaria =

Scientific classification
- Domain: Eukaryota
- Kingdom: Animalia
- Phylum: Arthropoda
- Class: Insecta
- Order: Lepidoptera
- Family: Geometridae
- Genus: Eupithecia
- Species: E. cuculliaria

Binomial name
- Eupithecia cuculliaria (Rebel, 1901)

Synonyms
- Tephroclystia cuculliaria Rebel, 1901; Eupithecia undata Bohatsch, 1893 (preocc. Freyer, 1840)

Species of moth

Eupithecia cuculliaria is a moth in the family Geometridae. It is found in Italy, Croatia, Slovenia, Albania, Bosnia and Herzegovina, North Macedonia, Greece, Bulgaria, Turkey and the Near East.

The wingspan is 15–17 mm.
