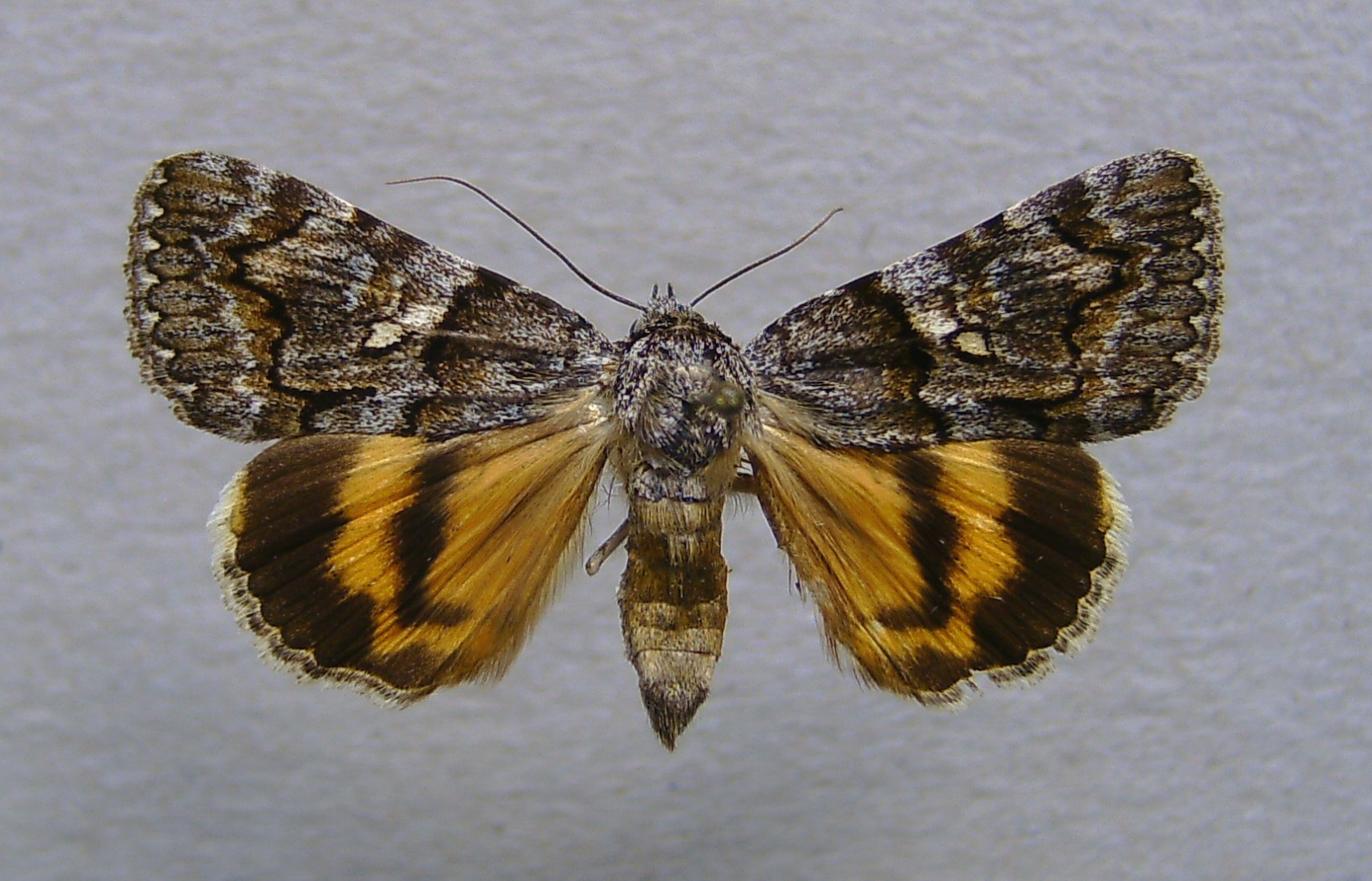

Scientific classification
- Kingdom: Animalia
- Phylum: Arthropoda
- Class: Insecta
- Order: Lepidoptera
- Superfamily: Noctuoidea
- Family: Erebidae
- Genus: Catocala
- Species: C. disjuncta

Binomial name
- Catocala disjuncta (Geyer, 1828)

Synonyms
- Noctua disjuncta Geyer, [1828]

= Catocala disjuncta =

Species of moth

Catocala disjuncta is a moth of the family Erebidae. It is found from south-eastern Europe to Asia Minor.

The wingspan is about 40 mm. Adults are on wing from June to September.
