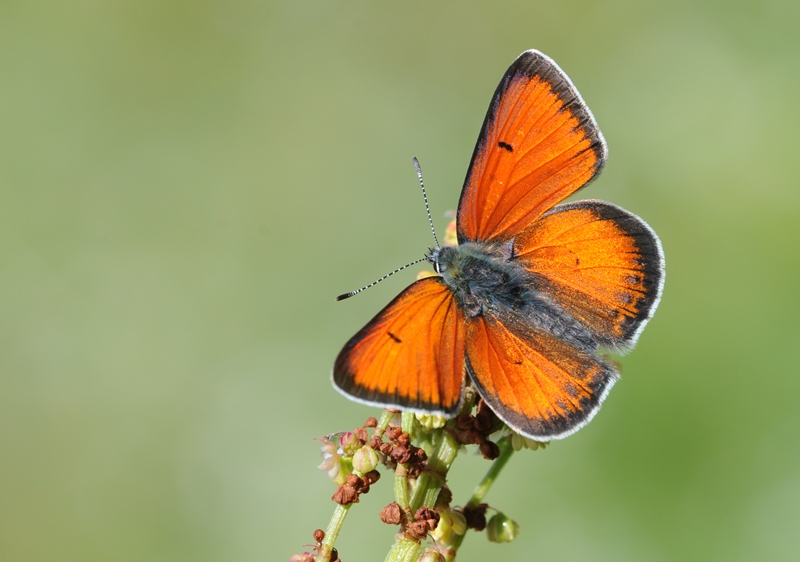
- Lycaena candens Turkey

Scientific classification
- Domain: Eukaryota
- Kingdom: Animalia
- Phylum: Arthropoda
- Class: Insecta
- Order: Lepidoptera
- Family: Lycaenidae
- Genus: Lycaena
- Species: L. candens

Binomial name
- Lycaena candens (Herrich-Schäffer, [1844])

= Lycaena candens =

Species of butterfly

Lycaena candens is a small butterfly found in the Palearctic (Southeast Europe and Caucasus) that belongs to the lycaenids or blues family.

== Subspecies ==
- L. c. leonhardi (Fruhstorfer, 1917)
- L. c. pfeifferi (Beuret, 1952) Caucasus, Transcaucasia

== Description from Seitz ==
The males have no blue sheen and the forewing above is entirely golden brown in the females; the black margin of the upperside is narrower in both sexes.

== Biology ==
The larva on feeds on Rumex

== See also ==
- List of butterflies of Russia
