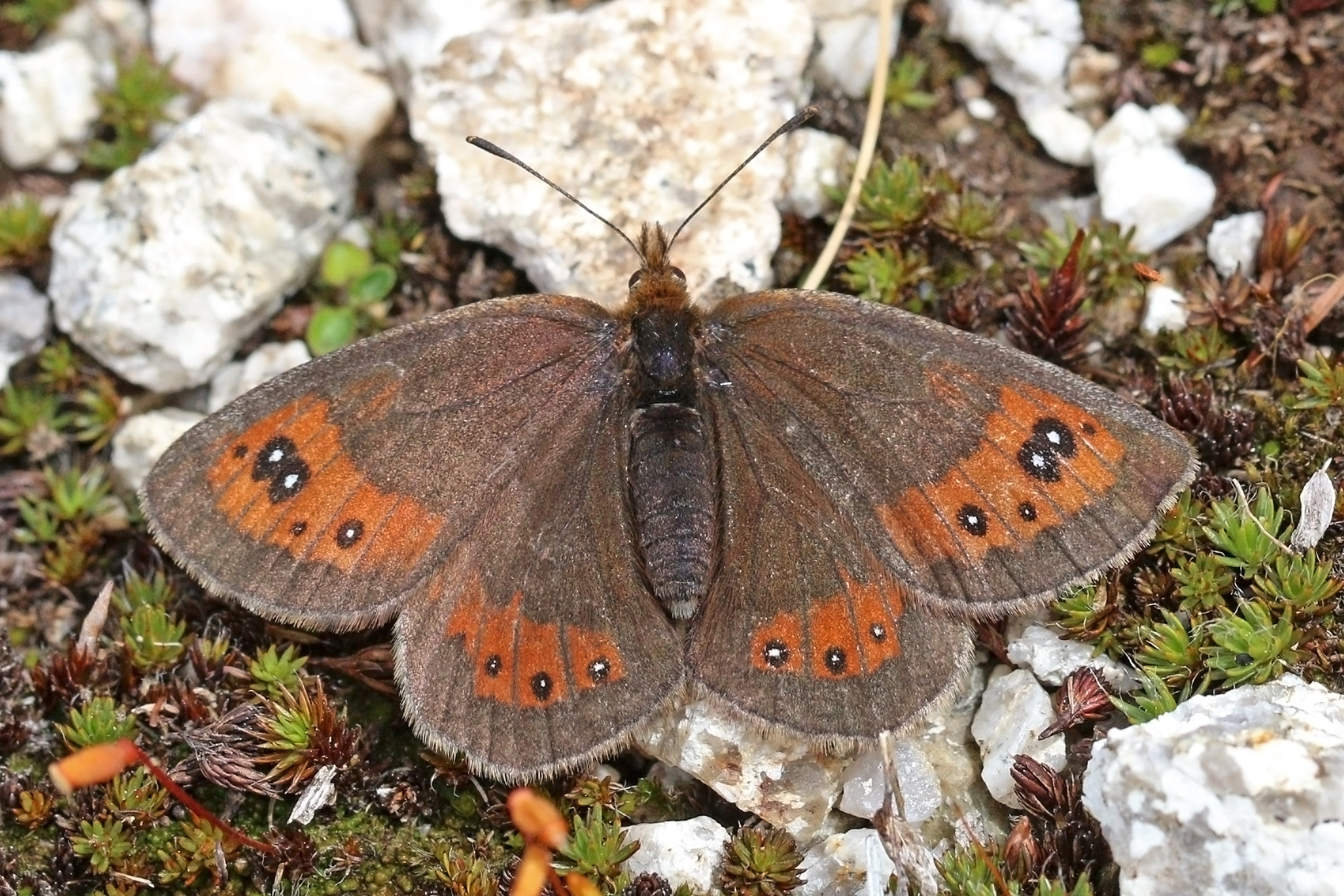
- Erebia rhodopensis Bulgaria

Scientific classification
- Kingdom: Animalia
- Phylum: Arthropoda
- Class: Insecta
- Order: Lepidoptera
- Family: Nymphalidae
- Genus: Erebia
- Species: E. rhodopensis

Binomial name
- Erebia rhodopensis Nicholl, 1900

= Erebia rhodopensis =

Nicholl's ringlet

Species of butterfly

Erebia rhodopensis, Nicholl's ringlet, is a member of the subfamily Satyrinae of the family Nymphalidae. It is found in the Balkans.

== Description ==
Nicholl's ringlet is a small, dark brown butterfly with a reddish-orange postdiscoid band, adorned on the anterior wings with two white-pupiled eyespots. Other vestigial eyespots are present on the anterior and posterior wings.The reverse of the front wings is similar, that of the hind wings has alternating dark and lighter bands.

== Biology ==
It flies in July and August in one generation

== Ecology and distribution ==
It is located in the Balkan mountains, in Bulgaria, Greece, Macedonia and Serbia. It lives on grassy slopes.

== Protection ==
It is declared vulnerable (VU) and protected in Bulgaria

== Etymology ==
The specific epithet refers to the Rhodope Mountains.
