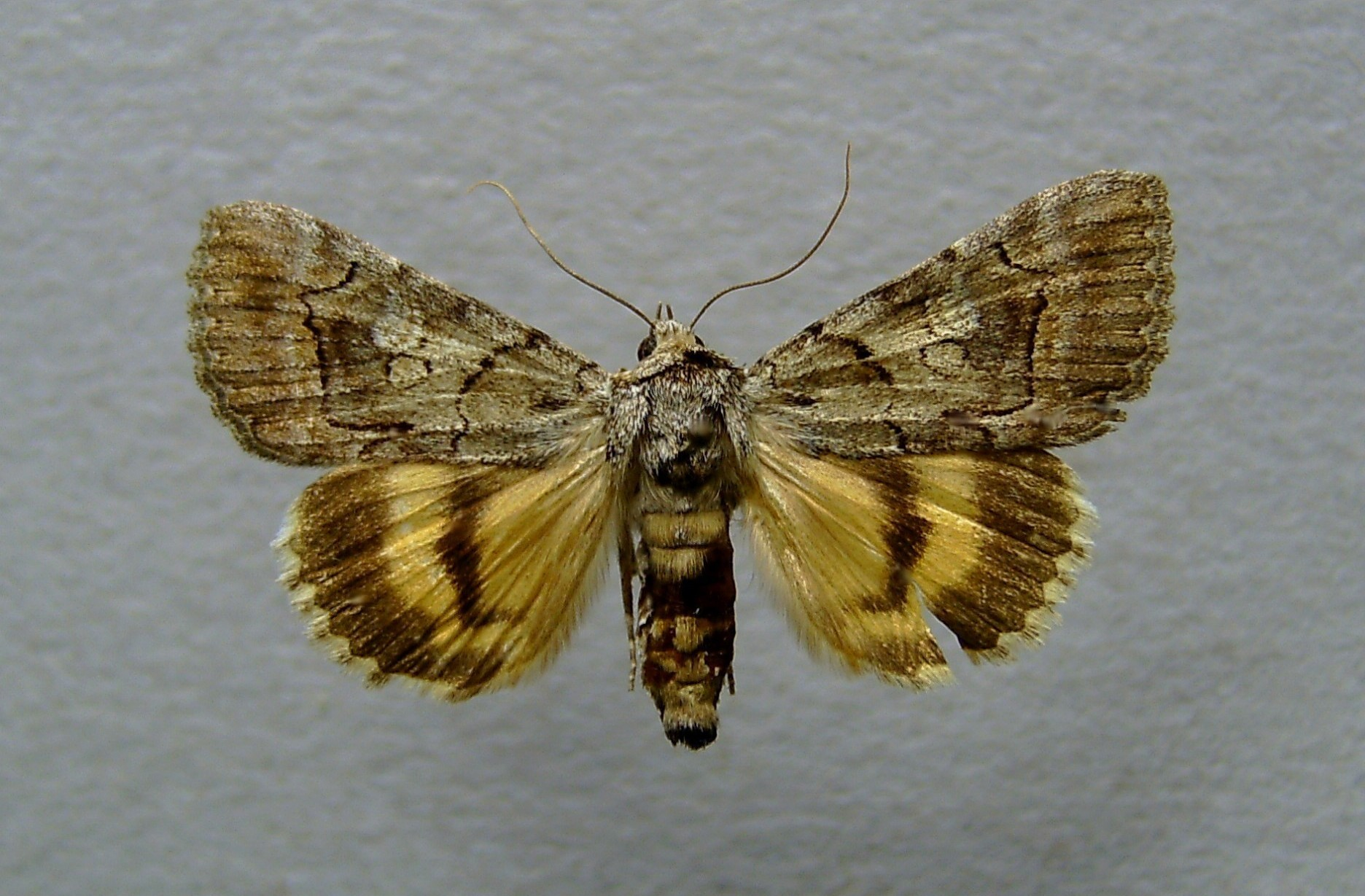

Scientific classification
- Kingdom: Animalia
- Phylum: Arthropoda
- Class: Insecta
- Order: Lepidoptera
- Superfamily: Noctuoidea
- Family: Erebidae
- Genus: Catocala
- Species: C. eutychea

Binomial name
- Catocala eutychea Treitschke, 1835

Synonyms
- Catocala dotata Herrich-Schäffer, [1851]; Catocala delicata Vincent, 1913; Catocala eutychea languida Herrich-Schäffer, [1851]

= Catocala eutychea =

Species of moth

Catocala eutychea is a moth of the family Erebidae first described by Georg Friedrich Treitschke in 1835. It is found in the eastern parts of the Mediterranean, especially the Balkans.

There is one generation per year. Adults are on wing from June to August.

The larvae feed on Quercus coccifera.
