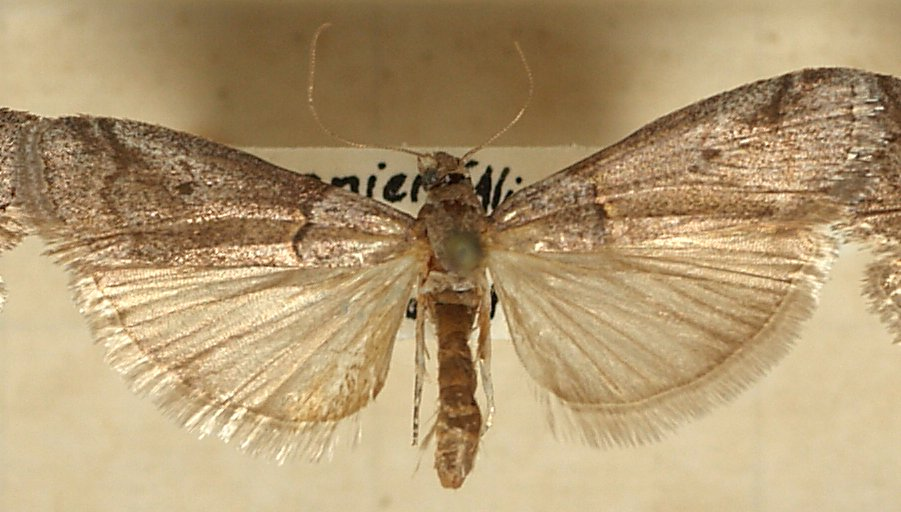

Scientific classification
- Kingdom: Animalia
- Phylum: Arthropoda
- Clade: Pancrustacea
- Class: Insecta
- Order: Lepidoptera
- Family: Pyralidae
- Genus: Acrobasis
- Species: A. obliqua

Binomial name
- Acrobasis obliqua (Zeller, 1847)

Synonyms
- Myelois obliqua Zeller, 1847; Acrobasis glycerella Staudinger, 1859; Acrobasis cinerascens Turati, 1927; Acrobasis clusinella Zeller, 1848; Acrobasis obliqua malombra Roesler, 1988; Myelois youngi Rothschild, 1925; Phycis cistella Millière, 1859

= Acrobasis obliqua =

Species of moth

Acrobasis obliqua is a moth of the family Pyralidae. It is found in southern Europe.
