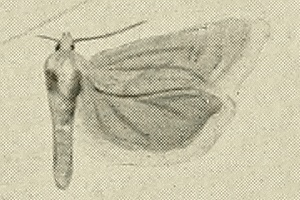

Scientific classification
- Domain: Eukaryota
- Kingdom: Animalia
- Phylum: Arthropoda
- Class: Insecta
- Order: Lepidoptera
- Family: Tortricidae
- Genus: Aethes
- Species: A. nefandana

Binomial name
- Aethes nefandana (Kennel, 1899)

Synonyms
- Cochylis nefandana Kennel, 1899; Aethes chersonana Obraztsov, 1937; Conchylis diacrisiana Rebel, 1903

= Aethes nefandana =

Species of moth

Aethes nefandana is a species of moth of the family Tortricidae. It was described by Kennel in 1899. It is found in Austria, the Czech Republic, Slovakia, Croatia, Albania, Bulgaria, Romania, Serbia, North Macedonia, Greece, Russia, Asia Minor and western Kazakhstan.

The wingspan is 19–20 millimetres (0.75–0.79 in). Adults are on wing from April to July.

The larvae feed on Eryngium species.
