= Coleophora hartigi =

Scientific classification
- Kingdom: Animalia
- Phylum: Arthropoda
- Class: Insecta
- Order: Lepidoptera
- Family: Coleophoridae
- Genus: Coleophora
- Species: C. hartigi

Binomial name
- Coleophora hartigi Toll, 1944

Species of moth

Coleophora hartigi is a moth of the family Coleophoridae. It is found from Germany to Italy and Greece and from Austria to Bulgaria.

The larvae feed on Genista germanica. They create a trivalved composite leaf case of about 7 mm. The mouth angle is about 15°.
