= Eupithecia gratiosata =

Scientific classification
- Domain: Eukaryota
- Kingdom: Animalia
- Phylum: Arthropoda
- Class: Insecta
- Order: Lepidoptera
- Family: Geometridae
- Genus: Eupithecia
- Species: E. gratiosata

Binomial name
- Eupithecia gratiosata Herrich-Schäffer, 1861

Synonyms
- Eupithecia subseparata Christoph, 1885

Species of moth

Eupithecia gratiosata is a moth in the family Geometridae. It is found in France, the Iberian Peninsula, Italy, the Balkan Peninsula, Ukraine, Poland, Russia, Turkmenistan, Kazakhstan, the Near East and Iran.

The wingspan is 21–25 mm.

The larvae feed on various Apiaceae species.
