= Udea austriacalis =

Scientific classification
- Kingdom: Animalia
- Phylum: Arthropoda
- Class: Insecta
- Order: Lepidoptera
- Family: Crambidae
- Genus: Udea
- Species: U. austriacalis

Binomial name
- Udea austriacalis (Herrich-Schaffer, 1851)

Synonyms
- Botys austriacalis Herrich-Schaffer, 1851; Pyrausta austriacalis altaica Zerny, 1914; Botys nitidalis Heinemann, 1865; Botys sororialis Heyden, 1860; Pyrausta austriacalis juldusalis Zerny, 1914; Pyrausta austriacalis plumbalis Zerny, 1914; Scopula donzelalis Guenée, 1854

Species of moth

Udea austriacalis is a species of moth in the family Crambidae. It is found from Spain, France, Switzerland, Italy, Austria, Romania, Bulgaria, Albania and Greece to Russia and China.
