= Glyphipterix loricatella =

Scientific classification
- Kingdom: Animalia
- Phylum: Arthropoda
- Clade: Pancrustacea
- Class: Insecta
- Order: Lepidoptera
- Family: Glyphipterigidae
- Genus: Glyphipterix
- Species: G. loricatella

Binomial name
- Glyphipterix loricatella (Treitschke, 1833)

Synonyms
- Aechmia loricatella Treitschke, 1833

Species of moth

Glyphipterix loricatella is a moth of the family Glyphipterigidae. It is found in Hungary, Romania and Albania. In Hungary, the species has only been recorded from three localities in Budapest, and one slightly further north. The habitat consists of clearings in oak-shrub forest-steppe on calcareous ground.
