= Vranický =

Vranický (feminine form Vranická) is a Czech surname. It may originate from an old Moravian noble family associated with a place named Vranice. The Germanized forms are Wranitzky and Vranitzky. Notable people with this surname include:

- Antonín Vranický (1761–1820), Czech composer and violinist
- Pavel Vranický (1756–1808), Moravian composer
