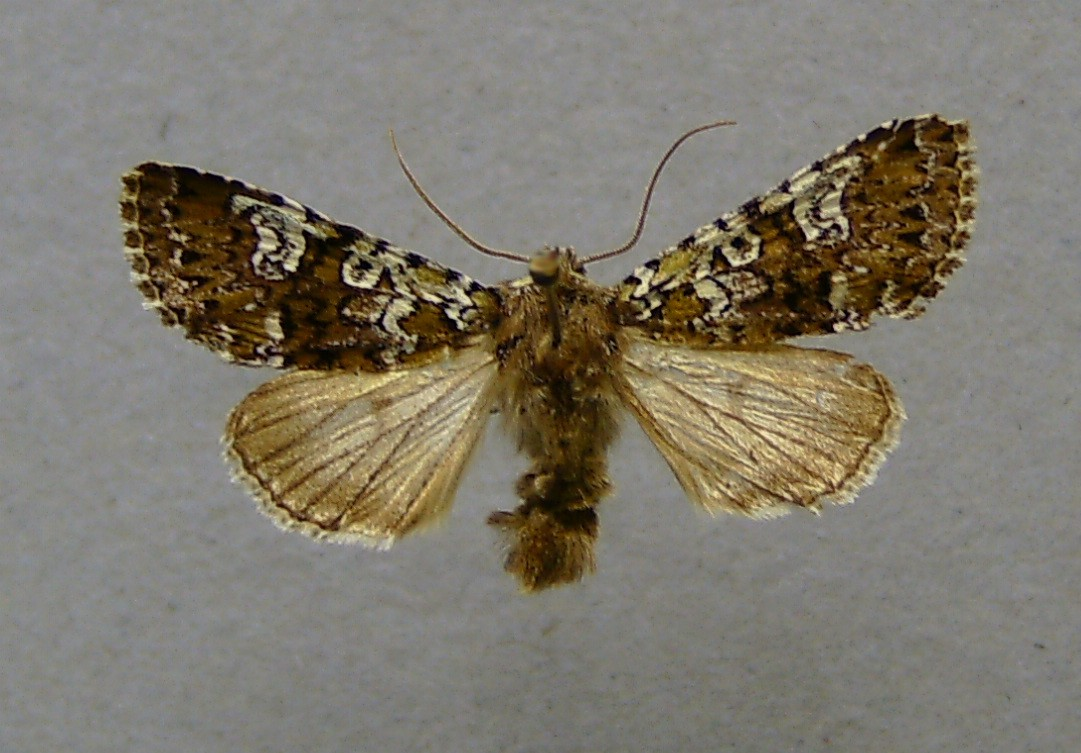

Scientific classification
- Domain: Eukaryota
- Kingdom: Animalia
- Phylum: Arthropoda
- Class: Insecta
- Order: Lepidoptera
- Superfamily: Noctuoidea
- Family: Noctuidae
- Genus: Crypsedra
- Species: C. gemmea

Binomial name
- Crypsedra gemmea (Treitschke, 1825)

Synonyms
- Miselia gemmea; Polymixis gemmea; Hadena gemmea

= Crypsedra gemmea =

Species of moth

Crypsedra gemmea is a moth of the family Noctuidae. It is found in Central and Northern Europe.

== Technical description and variation ==
C. gemmea Tr. (32 f). Superficially resembling L. viridana, the ground colour being the same olive- brown and the markings black and white; the orbicular stigma, however, is always round, not irregular in shape; the claviform of the ground colour, black-edged, sometimes with a few whitish scales in it, and of the ordinary shape, not triangular; the costal area is sprinkled with white scales; submarginal line white, preceded by black dentate marks; fringe brown with fine white chequering; hindwing in both sexes brownish grey, paler towards base, with cellspot and veins dark. Larva glossy bluish or greenish grey; tubercles black carrying a single pale hair; head, thoracic, and anal plates black brown. The length of the fore-wings is 16–20 mm.

== Biology ==
The moth flies from July to September depending on the location.

The larvae feed on various grasses, but prefer Molinia caerulea.
