= Wranitzky =

Wranitzky and Vranitzky are surnames, Germanized forms of the surname Czech surname Vranický. Notable people with the surnames include:

- Franz Vranitzky (born 1937), Austrian politician
- Paul Wranitzky, born Pavel Vranický (1756–1808), Czech composer and violinist
- Karoline Seidler-Wranitzky (1790–1872), Czech operatic soprano
