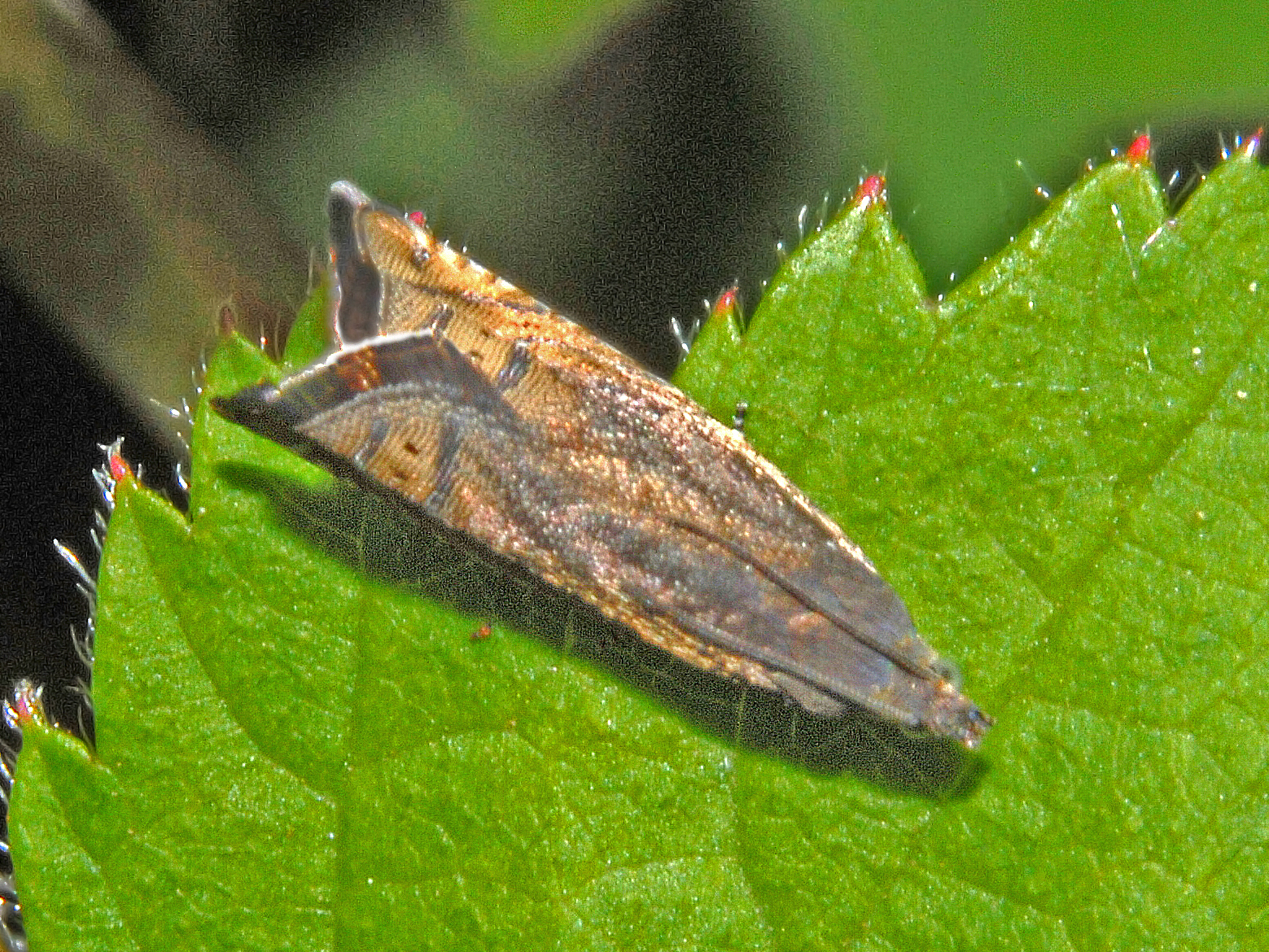
- Grapholita gemmiferana. Dorsal view
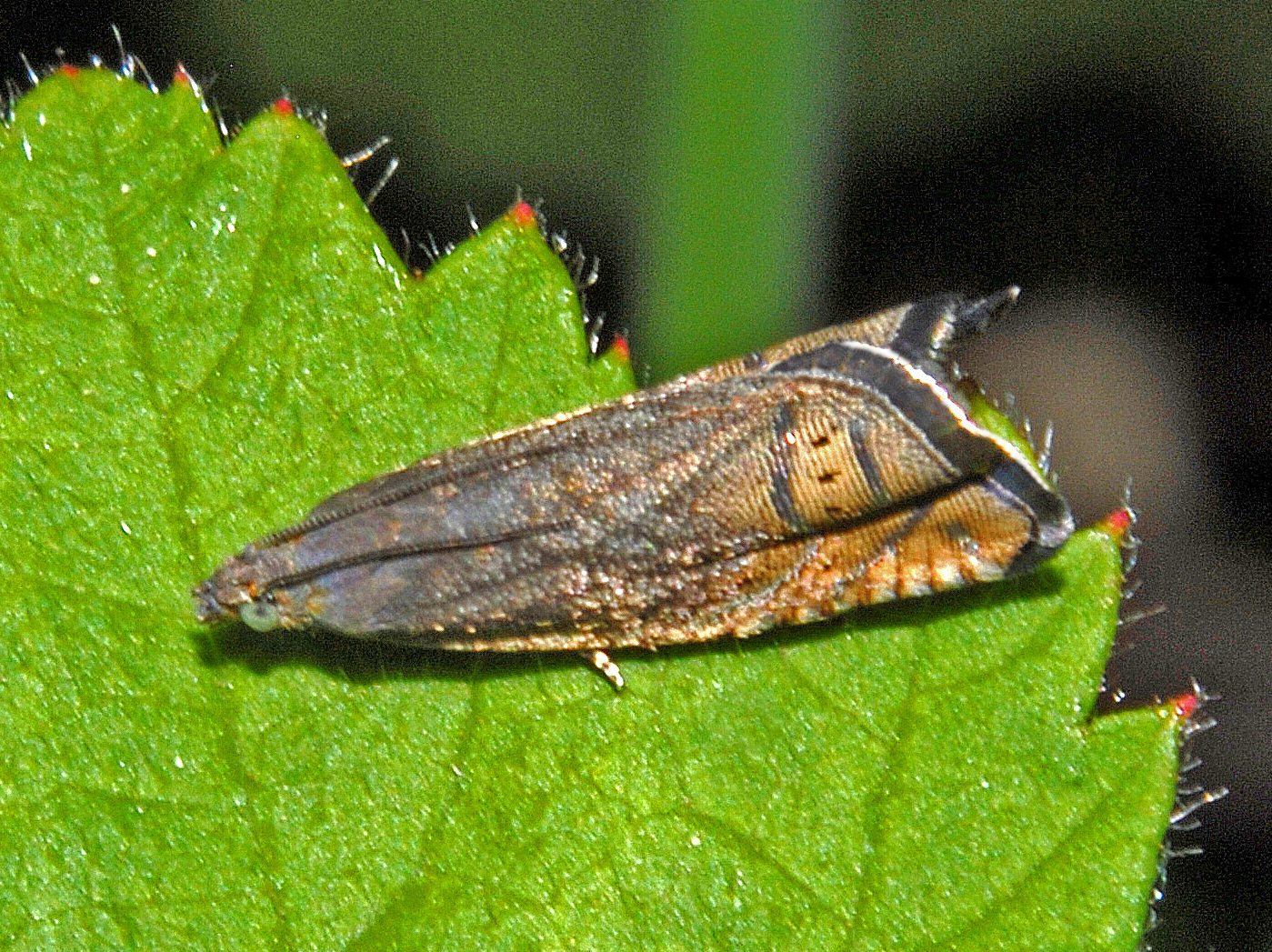
- Side view

Scientific classification
- Kingdom: Animalia
- Phylum: Arthropoda
- Clade: Pancrustacea
- Class: Insecta
- Order: Lepidoptera
- Family: Tortricidae
- Genus: Grapholita
- Species: G. gemmiferana

Binomial name
- Grapholita gemmiferana Treitschke, 1835

Synonyms
- List: Catoptria olbrenana Guenée, 1845; Cydia gemmiferana (Treitschke, 1835); Grapholitha gemmiferana (Treitschke, 1835)

= Grapholita gemmiferana =

Species of moth

Grapholita gemmiferana is a species of moth of the family Tortricidae.

== Distribution ==
This species is present in most of Europe and in the Near East.

== Description ==
Grapholita gemmiferana has a wingspan of 13–16 millimetres (0.51–0.63 in). These moths are characterized by a basically slate-colored forewings, with an orange-ochreous color in the distal area, also showing various silvery lines and spots. Females are usually darker. This species is rather similar to Grapholita caecana.

== Biology ==
Adult moths fly from April to July, caterpillars can be found from June to September. Larvae feed within spun leaves of the narrow-leaved everlasting-pea (Lathyrus sylvestris) and on the pods of Lathyrus pannonicus. They overwinter in a cocoon from August- September and pupate in April.
