= Grapholita nebritana =

Scientific classification
- Domain: Eukaryota
- Kingdom: Animalia
- Phylum: Arthropoda
- Class: Insecta
- Order: Lepidoptera
- Family: Tortricidae
- Genus: Grapholita
- Species: G. nebritana

Binomial name
- Grapholita nebritana Treitschke, 1830

Species of moth

Grapholita nebritana is a species of moth belonging to the family Tortricidae.

It is native to Central Europe.
