= William Warren (entomologist) =

English entomologist

William Warren (20 January 1839 in Cambridge – 18 October 1914 in Hemel Hempstead) was an English entomologist who specialised in Lepidoptera.

Warren was first educated at Oakham School, and subsequently graduated from the University of Cambridge, taking first-class classical honours in 1861. He then taught at Sedbergh School, Doncaster Grammar School (1866–1876) and Stubbington House School. He collected extensively in the British Isles, notably at Wicken Fen, with a special interest in Micro-lepidoptera. After giving up teaching in 1882, he lived in Cambridge and devoted himself fully to entomology, publishing around 40 papers on British moths between 1878 and 1889.

In 1887, he was the first to recognise Grapholita pallifrontana as a British species of micro-moth, a species which now has the English name the Liquorice Piercer and is of conservation concern. Later that year he successfully bred the moth and described its larvae. In 1888, he moved to Chelsea, London, where he worked as a professional entomologist on Pyralidae and Geometridae in the Natural History Museum. Later, by the intervention of Albert Günther, for the Natural History Museum at Tring, publishing over 80 more papers. Warren made collecting trips to the Punjab, Brazil and Japan. He was a Fellow of the Royal Entomological Society of London from 1886–1914.

== Selected works ==
- 1894 New genera and species of Geometridae. Novitates Zoologicae, 1(2): 366–466.
- 1895 New species and genera of Geometridae in the Tring Museum. Novitates Zoologicae, 2: 82–159.
- 1896 New Geometridae in the Tring Museum. Novitates Zoologicae, 3: 99–148.
- 1896 New species of Drepanulidae, Uraniidae, Epiplemidae, and Geometridae from the Papuan region. Novitates Zoologicae, 3: 272–306.
- 1896 New species of Drepanulidae, Thyrididae, Uraniidae, Epiplemidae, and Geometridae in the Tring Museum. Novitates Zoologicae, 3: 335–419.
- 1897 New genera and species of moths from the Old-World regions in the Tring Museum. Novitates Zoologicae, 4: 12–130.
- 1897 New genera and species of Thyrididae, Epiplemidae, and Geometridae from South and Central America and the West Indies, in the Tring Museum Novitates Zoologicae 4 : 408–507
- 1898 New species and genera of the families Thyrididae, Uraniidae, Epiplemidae, and Geometridae. Novitates Zoologicae, 5: 5–41.
- 1898 New species and genera of the families Drepanulidae, Thyrididae, Uraniidae, Epiplemidae, and Geometridae from the Old-World regions. Novitates Zoologicae, 5: 221–258.
- 1899 New species and genera of the families Drepanulidae, Thyrididae, Uraniidae, Epiplemidae, and Geometridae from the Old-World regions. Novitates Zoologicae, 6(1): 1–66.
- 1899b New Drepanulidae, Thyrididae, and Geometridae from the Aethiopian region. – Novitates Zoologicae 6(3):288–312
- 1900 New genera and species of Thyrididae and Geometridae from Africa. Novitates Zoologicae, 7: 94–98.
- 1900b New Genera and Species of Drepanulidae, Thryrididae, Epiplemidae and Geometridae from the Indo-Australian and Palaearctic Regions. Novitates Zoologicae, 7:98–116
- 1901 New Thyrididae, Epiplemidae and Geometridae from the Ethiopian region. Novitates Zoologicae, 8: 6–20.
- 1901 Drepanulidae, Thyrididae, Epiplemidae, and Geometridae from the Aethiopian region. Novitates Zoologicae, 8: 202–217.
- 1901 New American Moths. Novitates Zoologicae, 8: 435–492.
- 1902 New African Drepanulidae, Thyrididae, Epiplemidae, and Geometridae in the Tring Museum. Novitates Zoologicae, 9: 487–536.
- 1904 New Drepanulidae, Thyrididae, Uraniidae, and Geometridae from the Aethiopian Region. Novitates Zoologicae, 11: 461–482.
- 1905a New species of Thyrididae, Uraniidae, and Geometridae, from the Oriental Region. Novitates Zoologicae, 12: 6–15
- 1905b Lepidoptera from the Sudan. Novitates Zoologicae, 12: 21–23 pl.IV
- 1905c New Species of Geoometridae from the Aethiopian Region. Novitates Zoologicae, 12: 34–40
- 1905d New American Thyrididae, Uraniidae, and Geometridae. Novitates Zoologicae, 12:307–379
- 1905e New African Thyrididae, Uraniidae, and Geometridae. Novitates Zoologicae, 12: 380–409.
- 1905f New species of Thyrididae, Uraniidae and Geometridae from the Oriental Region. Novitates Zoologicae, 12 :410–447
- 1905g Lepidoptera collected by Mr.W.R.Ogilvie-Grant on the Azores and Madeira in 1903. Novitates Zoologicae, 12: 439–447
- 1909 New species of Uraniidae and geometridae from the Aethiopian region. Novitates Zoologicae, 16: 110–122.
- 1909 Noctuae in Seitz, 1909 Die Gross-Schmetterlinge des Palaearktischen Faunengebietes. 3. Die eulenartigen Nacthfalter Gross-Schmett. Erde 3 : 1–511, pl. 1-75.
- 1911 Description of some new Geometridae and Pyralidae from South Africa. Annals of the South African Museum, 10(1): 19–30.
- 1912 New Noctuidae in the Tring Museum mainly from the Indo-Oriental Region Novitates Zoologicae, 19: 1–57.
- 1912 New Geometridae in the Tring Museum from new Guinea. Novitates Zoologicae, 19: 68–85.
- 1914 New species of Drepanulidae, Noctuidae and Geometridae in the Tring museum. Novitates Zoologicae, 21: 401–425.
- 1915 Some new oriental Cymatophoridae in the Tring museum. Novitates Zoologicae, 22: 154–159.
