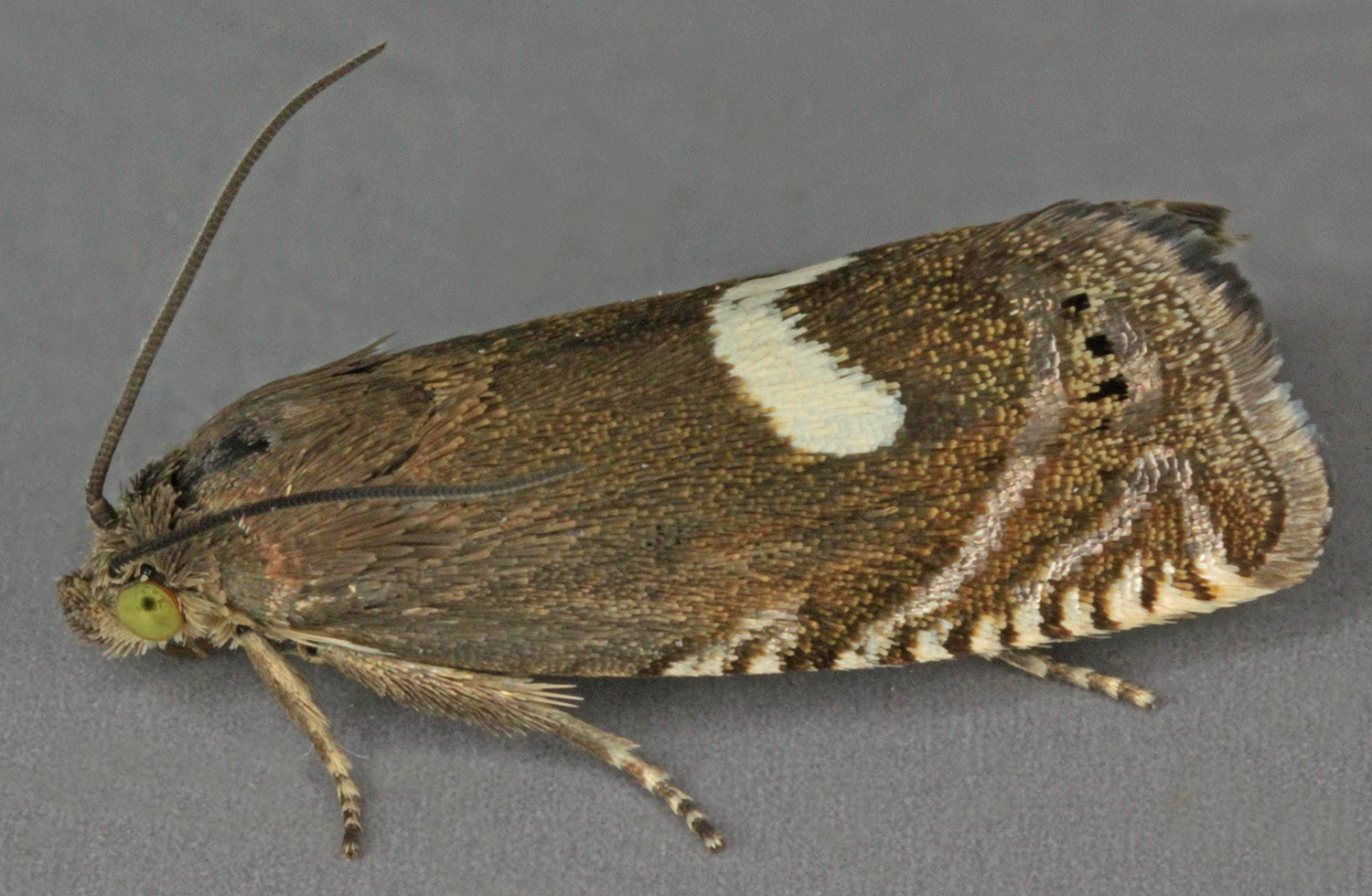

Scientific classification
- Domain: Eukaryota
- Kingdom: Animalia
- Phylum: Arthropoda
- Class: Insecta
- Order: Lepidoptera
- Family: Tortricidae
- Genus: Grapholita
- Species: G. lunulana

Binomial name
- Grapholita lunulana (Denis & Schiffermüller, 1775)

= Grapholita lunulana =

Species of moth

Grapholita lunulana is a moth belonging to the family Tortricidae. The species was first described by Michael Denis and Ignaz Schiffermüller in 1775.

It is native to Europe and Northern America.

The wingspan is 12–17 mm. The forewing has, as is usual in this genus, a comma-shaped white spot at the dorsal edge, this is without a brown middle strip. Just outside this spot there is a short, silver-coloured cross-strip and four drop-shaped black spots. At the front edge there are numerous small white cross spots. The hindwings are brown, but shiny white at the root.It differs from Grapholita orobana as follows : palpi partly dark fuscous; antennae of male unusually long and thick; forewings with costa in male straighter, dorsal blotch narrow and less curved, hindwings in male with dark border still broader, in female wholly dark fuscous.

The larvae feed on Lathyrus spp. and Vicia spp., eating the ripening seeds. The adults fly in the sunshine in May–June
