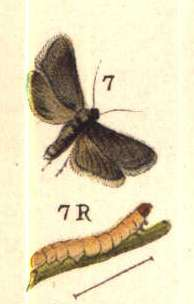
- Adult (above) and caterpillar (below) of the plum fruit moth (G. funebrana) from the Nordisk familjebok. Scale is 1 cm.

Scientific classification
- Kingdom: Animalia
- Phylum: Arthropoda
- Clade: Pancrustacea
- Class: Insecta
- Order: Lepidoptera
- Family: Tortricidae
- Subfamily: Olethreutinae
- Tribe: Grapholitini
- Genus: Grapholita; Treitschke, 1829

Type species
- "Pyralis dorsana" sensu Treitschke, 1829 (see text)

Diversity
- 126 species

Synonyms
- Numerous, see text

= Grapholita =

Genus of tortrix moths

Grapholita is a large genus of tortrix moths (family Tortricidae). It belongs to subfamily Olethreutinae, and therein to the tribe Grapholitini, of which it is the type genus.

== Taxonomy and systematics ==
Georg Friedrich Treitschke established Grapholita in 1829 – in the 7th volume of Schmetterlinge von Europa, with a type species he claimed to be "Pyralis dorsana", a taxon established by Johan Christian Fabricius in his 1775 Systema Entomologiae. But Treitschke was misled by Jacob Hübner's misidentification of Fabricius' moth.

The actual P. dorsana is today known as Dichrorampha petiverella, as it had already been described by Carl Linnaeus in his 1758 edition of Systema Naturae as Phalaena (Tinea) petiverella. The "Pyralis dorsana" of Hübner and Treitschke was subsequently identified as the species described as Tortrix lunulana by Michael Denis and Ignaz Schiffermüller in 1775, which thus is today Grapholita lunulana.

=== Species ===
Grapholita currently has 126 recognised species, though the genus' distinctness from and delimitation against Cydia is in need of further study:

- Grapholita amictana (Felder & Rogenhofer, 1875)
- Grapholita amphitorna (Turner, 1916)
- Grapholita andabatana (Wolff, 1957)
- Grapholita angleseana (Kearfott, 1907)
- Grapholita antitheta (Meyrick, 1911)
- Grapholita arcia Diakonoff, 1988
- Grapholita arcuatana Kuznetzov, 1992
- Grapholita astrapephora Diakonoff, 1976
- Grapholita aureolana Tengstrom, 1848
- Grapholita auroscriptana Caradja, 1916
- Grapholita bigeminata (Meyrick in Caradja & Meyrick, 1935)
- Grapholita biserialis (Meyrick in Caradja & Meyrick, 1935)
- Grapholita boulderana McDunnough, 1942
- Grapholita caecana Schläger, 1848
- Grapholita caeruleana Walsingham, 1879
- Grapholita callisphena (Meyrick, 1907)
- Grapholita caudicula Diakonoff, 1975
- Grapholita cerasivora (Matsumura, 1917)
- Grapholita chrysacrotoma Diakonoff, 1976
- Grapholita comanticosta Kuznetzov, 1988
- Grapholita compositella – clover seed moth
- Grapholita conficitana (Walker, 1863)
- Grapholita conversana Walsingham, 1879
- Grapholita coronillana Lienig & Zeller, 1846
- Grapholita cotoneastri Danilevsky in Danilevsky & Kuznetsov, 1968
- Grapholita curviphalla Liu & Yan, 1998
- Grapholita cyanogona (Meyrick, 1907)
- Grapholita dactyla Liu & Yan, 1998
- Grapholita decolorana Walker, 1863
- Grapholita delineana Walker, 1863
- Grapholita diaphorotorna Diakonoff, 1983
- Grapholita difficilana (Walsingham, 1900)
- Grapholita dilectabilis Kuznetzov, 1972
- Grapholita dimorpha Komai, 1979
- Grapholita discretana Wocke in Staudinger & Wocke, 1861
- Grapholita dohrniana Zeller, 1863
- Grapholita dyarana (Kearfott, 1907)
- Grapholita dysaethria Diakonoff, 1982
- Grapholita eclipsana Zeller, 1875
- Grapholita edwardsiana (Kearfott, 1907)
- Grapholita endrosias (Meyrick, 1907)
- Grapholita exigua Kuznetzov, 1972
- Grapholita fana (Kearfott, 1907)
- Grapholita fimana Snellen, 1883
- Grapholita fissana (Frölich, 1828)
- Grapholita fistularis (Meyrick, 1928)
- Grapholita floricolana (Meyrick, 1881)
- Grapholita funebrana – plum fruit moth
- Grapholita geministriata (Walsingham, 1900)
- Grapholita gemmiferana Treitschke, 1835
- Grapholita globella Liu & Yan, 1998
- Grapholita globovalva Liu & Yan, 1998
- Grapholita glycyrrhizana (Kuznetzov in Danilevsky, Kuznetsov & Falkovitsh, 1962)
- Grapholita gypsothicta (Meyrick, 1938)
- Grapholita hamatana Kennel, 1901
- Grapholita heptatoma Diakonoff, 1976
- Grapholita hieroglyphana Blanchard & Knudson, 1984
- Grapholita hyalitis (Meyrick, 1909)
- Grapholita hylophanes (Meyrick, 1928)
- Grapholita hymenosa Razowski, 2013
- Grapholita imitativa Heinrich, 1926
- Grapholita inopinata Heinrich, 1928
- Grapholita internana
- Grapholita interstinctana (Clemens, 1860)
- Grapholita iridescens (Meyrick, 1881)
- Grapholita isacma (Meyrick, 1907)
- Grapholita janthinana (Duponchel in Godart, 1835)
- Grapholita jesonica (Matsumura, 1931)
- Grapholita jucundata Kuznetzov, 1971
- Grapholita junctistrigana (Walsingham, 1900)
- Grapholita jungiella
- Grapholita komaii Rose & Pooni, 2003
- Grapholita kurilana Kuznetzov, 1976
- Grapholita lana (Kearfott, 1907)
- Grapholita larseni Rebel, 1903
- Grapholita latens Kuznetzov, 1972
- Grapholita latericia Komai, 1999
- Grapholita lathyrana (Hübner, [1813])
- Grapholita libertina Heinrich, 1926
- Grapholita limbata Diakonoff, 1969
- Grapholita lobarzewskii (Nowicki, 1860)
- Grapholita lunatana Walsingham, 1879
- Grapholita lunulana (Denis & Schiffermüller, 1775)
- Grapholita macrodrilus Diakonoff, 1984
- Grapholita melicrossis (Meyrick, 1932)
- Grapholita mesoscia Diakonoff, 1969
- Grapholita miranda (Meyrick, 1911)
- Grapholita molesta – Oriental fruit moth, peach moth
- Grapholita namatophora Diakonoff, 1976
- Grapholita nebritana Treitschke in Ochsenheimer, 1830
- Grapholita nigrostriana Snellen, 1883
- Grapholita nucleana Felder & Rogenhofer, 1875
- Grapholita obliqua Diakonoff, 1982
- Grapholita okui Komai, 1999
- Grapholita omittana Kuznetzov, 1988
- Grapholita optica (Meyrick, 1912)
- Grapholita opulentica Kuznetzov, 1992
- Grapholita orbiapex Kuznetzov, 1988
- Grapholita orobana Treitschke in Ochsenheimer, 1830
- Grapholita packardi Zeller, 1875
- Grapholita pagenstecheri Bradley, 1961
- Grapholita pallifrontana
- Grapholita parvisignana (Meyrick, 1881)
- Grapholita patens Kuznetzov, 1971
- Grapholita pavonana (Walsingham, 1900)
- Grapholita prolopha (Meyrick, 1912)
- Grapholita prunivora (Walsh, 1868)
- Grapholita pycnograpta (Meyrick, 1936)
- Grapholita rhabdotacra Diakonoff, 1969
- Grapholita rosana Danilevsky in Danilevsky & Kuznetsov, 1968
- Grapholita schizodelta Diakonoff, 1982
- Grapholita scintillana Christoph, 1882
- Grapholita seclusana (Walker, 1866)
- Grapholita semifusca Kuznetzov in Danilevsky & Kuznetsov, 1968
- Grapholita shadawana Liu & Chen, 2000
- Grapholita siderocosma Diakonoff, 1978
- Grapholita sporosema (Meyrick, 1922)
- Grapholita steringus Diakonoff, 1983
- Grapholita tenebrosana Duponchel in Godart, 1842
- Grapholita tetrazancla (Turner, 1925)
- Grapholita thermopsidis Eiseman & Austin, 2020
- Grapholita tornosticha (Turner, 1946)
- Grapholita torodetta (Meyrick, 1914)
- Grapholita tricyanitis Dianokoff, 1976
- Grapholita tristriatana Pagenstecher, 1900
- Grapholita tristrigana (Clemens, 1865)
- Grapholita valens Kuznetzov, 1988
- Grapholita vitrana Walsingham, 1879
- Grapholita yasudai Komai, 1999
- Grapholita zapyrana (Meyrick, 1881)
- Grapholita zariae Razowski, 2013

=== Synonyms ===
Obsolete scientific names (junior synonyms and others) of Grapholita are:

- Aspila Stephens, 1834
- Coptoloma Lederer, 1859
- Ebisma Walker, 1866
- Endopisa Guenée, 1845
- Endopsia (lapsus)
- Endopiza (lapsus)
- Ephippiophora (lapsus)
- Ephippiphora Duponchel, 1834
- Eudopisa (lapsus)
- Euspila Stephens, 1834
- Grapholitha Treitschke, 1830 (unjustified emendation)
- Grapholltha (lapsus)
- Opadia Guenée, 1845
- Stigmonota Guenée, 1845
