= Karoline Seidler-Wranitzky =

Austrian-born Czech operatic soprano (1790–1872)

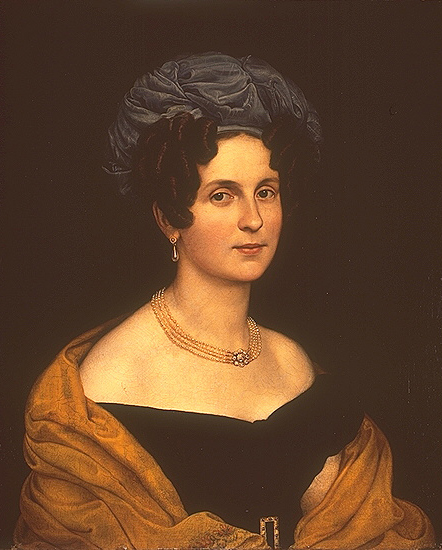
- Portrait of Seidler-Wranitzky; by Carl Joseph Begas, 1825
- Born: 17 January 1790; Vienna, Austria
- Died: 4 September 1872 (aged 82); Berlin, Germany
- Occupation: Soprano
- Years active: 1810s–1838
- Style: Classical; opera
- Spouse: Carl August Seidler (m. 1831)
- Father: Antonín Vranický
- Relatives: Paul Wranitzky (uncle)

Maria Karolina Johanna Seidler-Wranitzky (17 January 1790 – 4 September 1872) was an Austrian-born Czech operatic soprano. She notably created the role of Agathe in the world premiere of Carl Maria von Weber's Der Freischütz in 1821.

In performances, she was praised for her powerful voice and wide vocal range.

== Biography ==
Born in Vienna, Seidler-Wranitzky was the daughter of composer Antonín Vranický and niece of composer Paul Wranitzky. She received vocal training from her father, and her early performances took place in Munich and Budapest. She married Carl August Seidler (13 September 1778 – 27 February 1840) in 1813, a violinist from Berlin, who lived in Vienna from 1811 until 1816. In 1816, she performed at the Berlin Royal Opera and was so well received that she was engaged as a resident artist until 1838, after which she retired from the stage.

One of Seidler-Wranitzky's most well-known endeavors is her performance as the original Agathe in Carl Maria von Weber's Der Freischütz in 1821. In addition to this role, she also performed the title roles in Hélène and Agnes Sorel, Susanne in The Marriage of Figaro, and Pamina in The Magic Flute, amongst others.

She died in Berlin at the age of 82.
