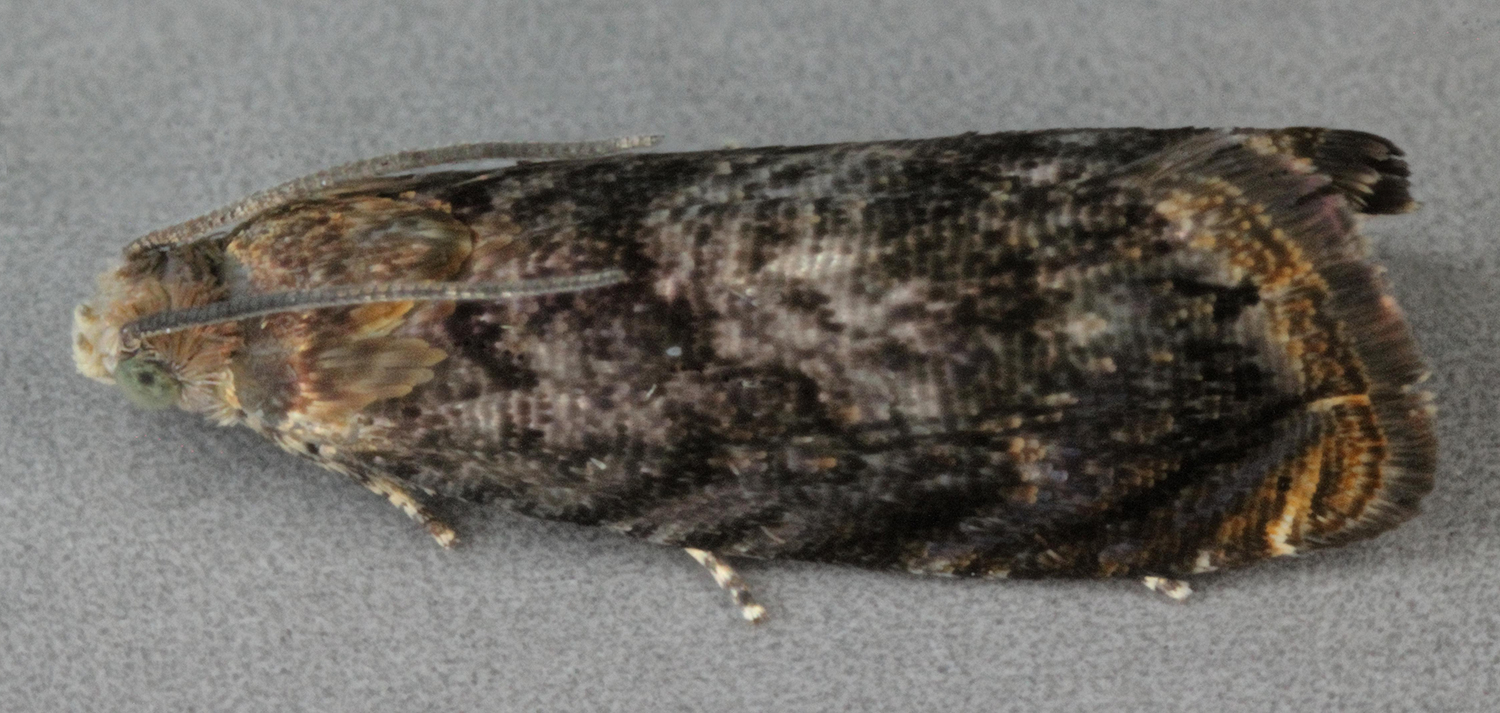
- Grapholita funebrana, Sontley, North Wales

Scientific classification
- Kingdom: Animalia
- Phylum: Arthropoda
- Clade: Pancrustacea
- Class: Insecta
- Order: Lepidoptera
- Family: Tortricidae
- Genus: Grapholita
- Species: G. funebrana

Binomial name
- Grapholita funebrana Treitschke, 1835

Synonyms
- Cydia funebrana (Treitschke, 1835); Grapholita (Aspila) funebrana Treitschke, 1835; Laspeyresia cerasana Kozhantshikov, 1953

= Grapholita funebrana =

Plum fruit moth

Grapholita funebrana, the plum fruit moth or red plum maggot, is a moth of the family Tortricidae. It is found in the Palearctic realm. Like many of its congeners, it is sometimes placed in Cydia.

The wingspan is 10–15 mm. The forewings are fuscous, striated with dark fuscous. The costa is posteriorly obscurely strigulated with whitish. The angulated edge of the basal patch and the central fascia are darker, the space between them is obscurely striated with whitish irroration towards dorsum. The ocellus is obscurely whitish-irrorated, edged with leaden -metallic, and it includes two or three blackish marks. The hindwings are fuscous, darker posteriorly. The larva is pale reddish; head blackish; plate of 2 pale ochreous.

The moth flies in two generations from late April to September.^{a}

The larvae feed on Prunus domestica, Prunus spinosa and other Prunus species. The species is considered to be a pest.

== Notes ==
^aThe flight season refers to Belgium and The Netherlands. This may vary in other parts of the range.
