= Jan Novák (composer) =

Czech composer (1921–1984)

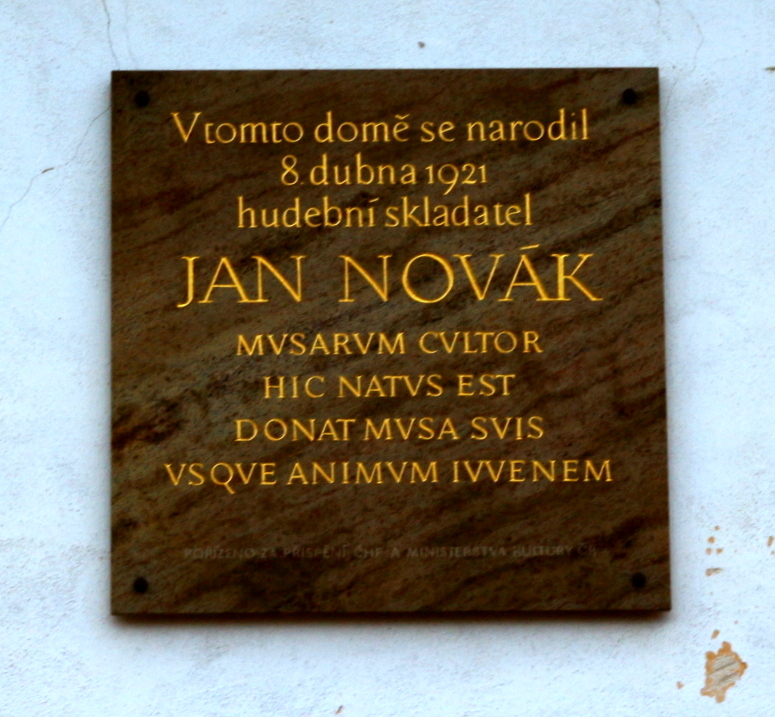
Commemorative plaque in Nová Říše, where Novák was born

Jan Novák (8 April 1921, Nová Říše – 17 November 1984, Neu Ulm) was a Czech composer of classical music. Novák was primarily active in the 1960s and composed the music for several films of Karel Kachyňa. Novák also composed music for the films of animators Jiří Trnka and Karel Zeman, the leading figures of the Czech animated film, as well as for Wir (1982, TV film) (based on We, the 1921 Russian novel by Yevgeny Zamyatin).

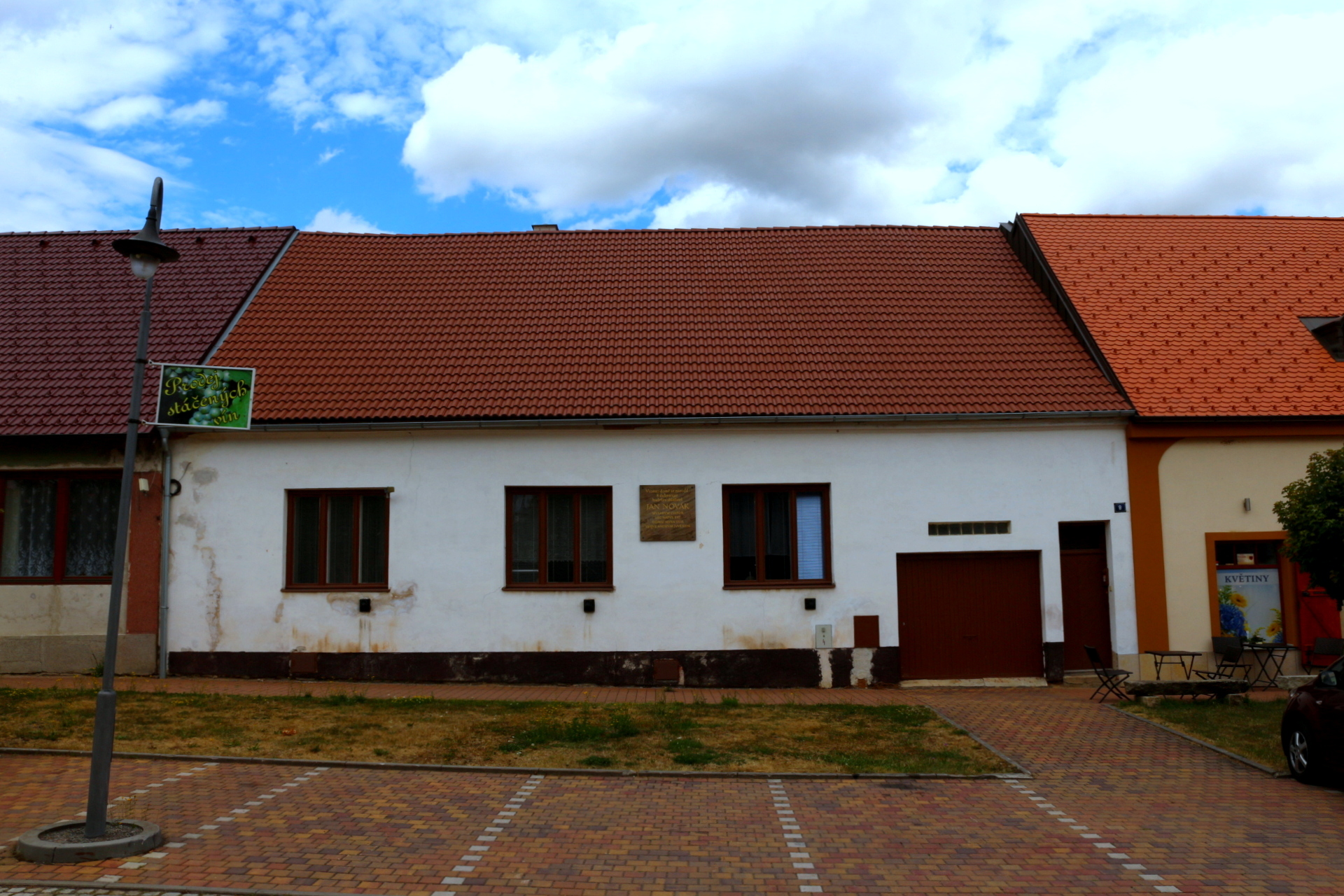
Novák's birthplace

Jan Novák was also a Contemporary Latin poet, under the pen name Ianus Novak. In 1970 he was awarded the magna laus at the Amsterdam Latin poetry competition, the Certamen poeticum Hoeufftianum.

== Selected works ==
- Concerto for oboe and orchestra (1952)
- Baletti a 9 for nonett (1955)
- Concerto for two pianos and orchestra (1955)
- Concertino for wind quintett (1957)
- Capriccio for cello and orchestra (1958)
- Dulces cantilenae for soprana and cello (1961)
- Passer Catulli for bass and nonett (1962)
- Ioci vernales for bass, octet and tape (1964)
- Dido, cantata for mezzosopran, speaker, men's choir and orchestra (1967)
- Exercitia mythologica for four- to eight-part mixed choir (1968)
- Ignis pro Ioanne Palach for choir and orchestra (1969)
- Apicius modulatus for voice and guitar (1971)
- Odarum concentus for strings orchestra (1973)
- Schola cantans for voice and piano (1973)
- Dulcitius, opera (1974)
- Concentus Biiugis for 4-hands piano and orchestra (1976)
- Due preludi e fughe for flute (1979)
- Ludi concertantes (1981)
- Sonata da chiesa I and II for flute and organ (1981)
- Sonata super hoson zes for violin or flute and piano (1981)
- Aesopia for four-part mixed choir and 2 pianos or small orchestra (1981)
- Vernalis temporis symphonia for soli, choir and orchestra (1982)
- Symphonia bipartita (1983)
- Sonata tribus for flute, violin and piano (1982)
- Marsyas for piccolo and piano (1983)
- Cantica Latina for voice and piano (discovered in 1985)
