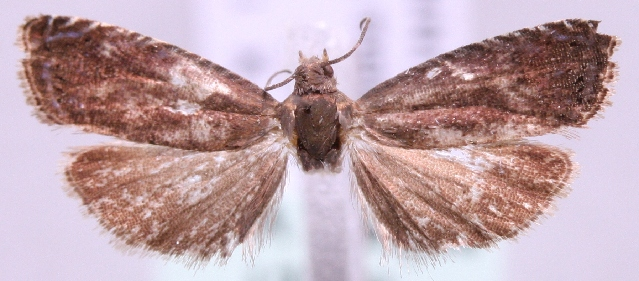

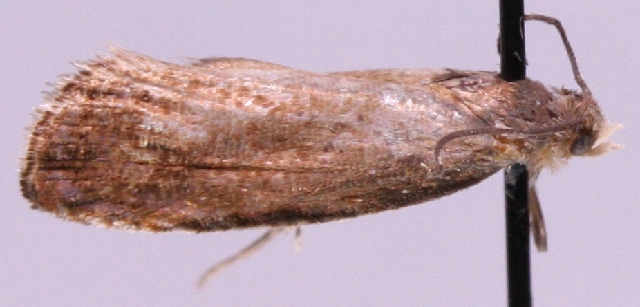

Scientific classification
- Kingdom: Animalia
- Phylum: Arthropoda
- Clade: Pancrustacea
- Class: Insecta
- Order: Lepidoptera
- Family: Tortricidae
- Genus: Grapholita
- Species: G. tenebrosana

Binomial name
- Grapholita tenebrosana Duponchel, 1843

Synonyms
- Grapholitha roseticolana Zeller, 1849; Grapholitha tristana Schlager, 1848

= Grapholita tenebrosana =

Species of moth

Grapholita tenebrosana is a moth of the family Tortricidae. It was described by Philogène Auguste Joseph Duponchel in 1843. It is found from most of Europe east to Japan. The habitat consists of woodland, gardens, orchards, parks and scrubs.

The wingspan is 11–14 mm. The palpi are whitish. The forewings are dark purplish -fuscous.The costa has indistinct silvery-whitish strigulae posteriorly. Three or four black dots are transversely placed in the ocellus. The hindwings are fuscous, darker posteriorly. The larva is flesh-coloured or pinkish-white; head and plate of 2 brownish ochreous.

Adults are on wing from June to July.
