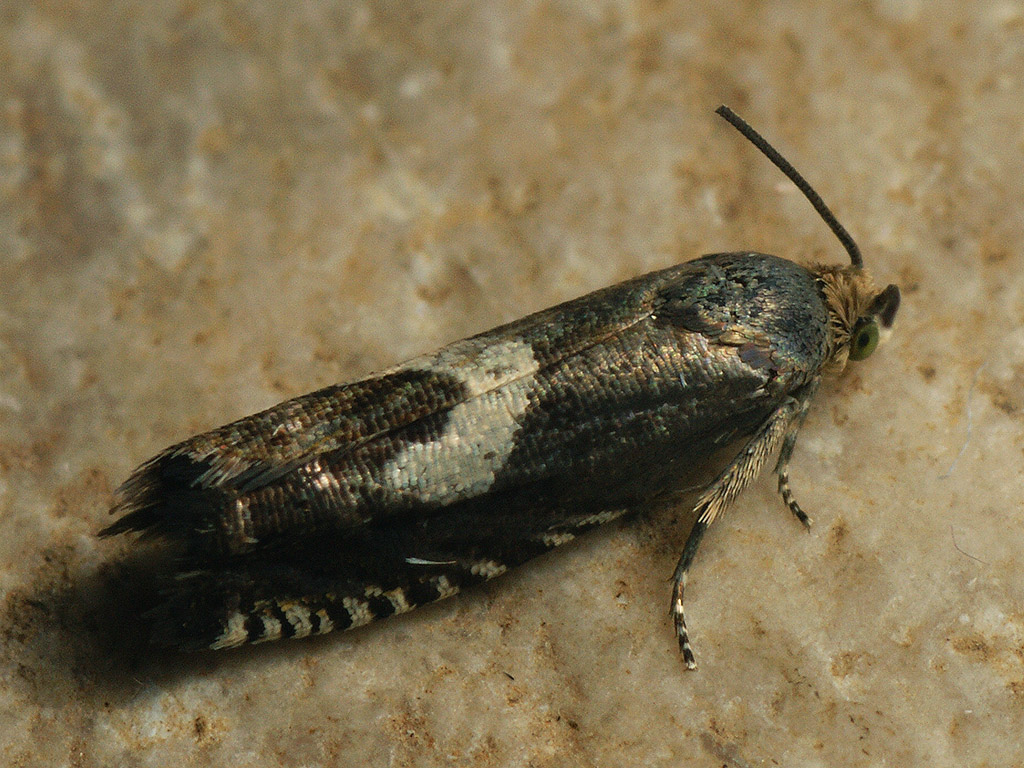

Scientific classification
- Domain: Eukaryota
- Kingdom: Animalia
- Phylum: Arthropoda
- Class: Insecta
- Order: Lepidoptera
- Family: Tortricidae
- Genus: Grapholita
- Species: G. orobana

Binomial name
- Grapholita orobana Treitschke, 1830

= Grapholita orobana =

Species of moth

Grapholita orobana is a moth belonging to the family Tortricidae. The species was first described by Georg Friedrich Treitschke in 1830. It is native to the Palearctic.

The wingspan is 11-15mm.The palpi are whitish. Forewings dark brown, sometimes sprinkled with pale ochreous; costa with strong ochreous-white strigulae, some ending in leaden metallic marks; a long moderately broad curved ochreous white median dorsal blotch; ocellus paler, edged with leaden-metallic, with several black dashes. Hindwings in male whitish with broad dark fuscous terminal border, in female dark fuscous, lighter basally.The larva is deep yellow, brownish-tinged; head and plate of 2 almost black.

The larvae feed on Vicia spp., eating the ripening seeds. The moths fly in the sunshine in July.
