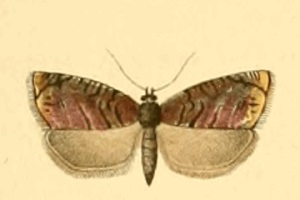

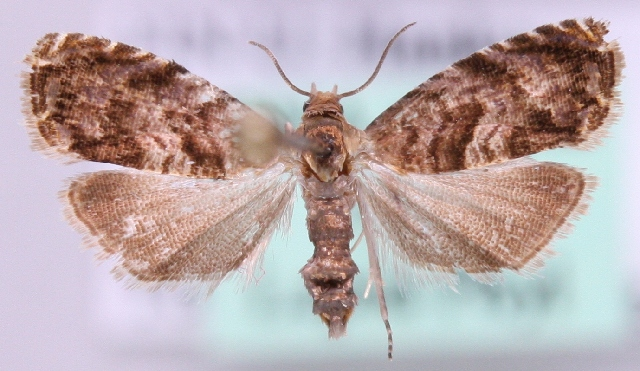

Scientific classification
- Kingdom: Animalia
- Phylum: Arthropoda
- Clade: Pancrustacea
- Class: Insecta
- Order: Lepidoptera
- Family: Tortricidae
- Genus: Grapholita
- Species: G. janthinana

Binomial name
- Grapholita janthinana (Duponchel, 1843)

Synonyms
- Coccyx janthinana Duponchel, in Godart, 1835; Tortrix incisana Herrich-Schaffer, 1848; Tortrix (Grapholitha) incisana Herrich-Schaffer, 1851

= Grapholita janthinana =

Species of moth

Grapholita janthinana, the hawthorn leafroller, is a moth of the family Tortricidae. It was described by Philogène Auguste Joseph Duponchel in 1843. It is found in most of Europe, except most of the Balkan Peninsula, Ukraine, Lithuania and Estonia. The habitat consists of hedgerows, gardens and woodland edges.

The wingspan is 9–11 mm. The palpi are whitish. The forewings are dull pinkish-ochreous, much mixed and striated with dark brown. The costa is dark brown, strigulated posteriorly with white. The angulated edge of basal patch and the central fascia are darker, between them there is an indistinct paler oblique quadrate streaked dorsal blotch. Some thick streaks from the costa and the margins of ocellus are dark ashy-leaden-metallic, the latter including some blackish marks. The apex and termen are ferruginous - orange. The hindwings are fuscous, darker posteriorly, the cilia in male shortened towards the tornus. The larva is pale pinkish-ochreous; head light brown.

Adults are on wing from May to early August in one generation per year.

The larvae feed on Crataegus, Prunus and Sorbus species. When feeding on Crataegus, they feed within the berries, spinning two or three together with silk. The species overwinters in a cocoon before pupating.
