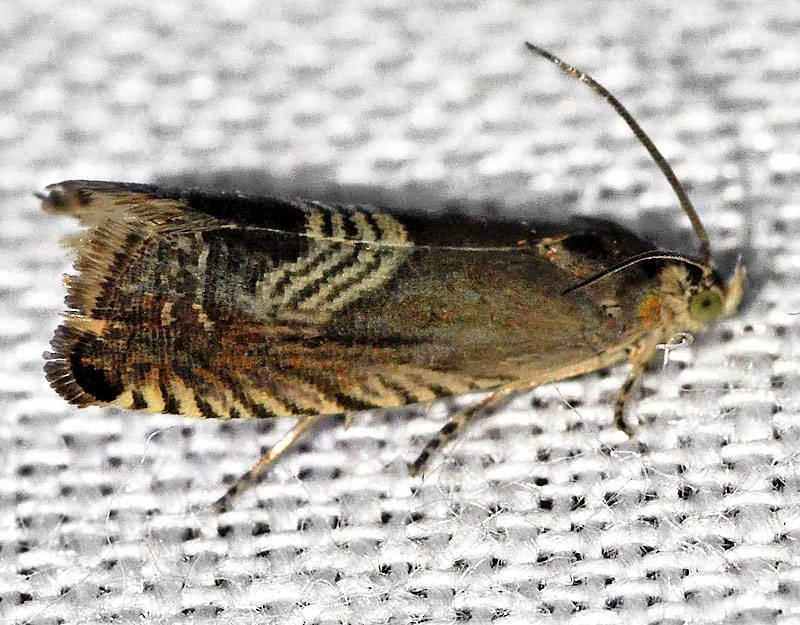

Scientific classification
- Kingdom: Animalia
- Phylum: Arthropoda
- Clade: Pancrustacea
- Class: Insecta
- Order: Lepidoptera
- Family: Tortricidae
- Genus: Grapholita
- Species: G. tristrigana

Binomial name
- Grapholita tristrigana (Clemens, 1865)

Synonyms
- Stigmonota tristrigana Clemens, 1865; Enarmonia saundersana Kearfott, 1907

= Grapholita tristrigana =

Three-lined grapholita moth

Species of moth

Grapholita tristrigana, the three-lined grapholita moth, is a moth of the family Tortricidae. It is found in North America, where it has been recorded from Florida, Georgia, Illinois, Indiana, Maryland, Massachusetts, Missouri, New York, Ohio, Oklahoma, Ontario and Pennsylvania.

The wingspan is about 13 mm. Adults have been recorded on wing from March to October, with most records in May and June.

The larvae feed on Baptisia and Lupinus species.
