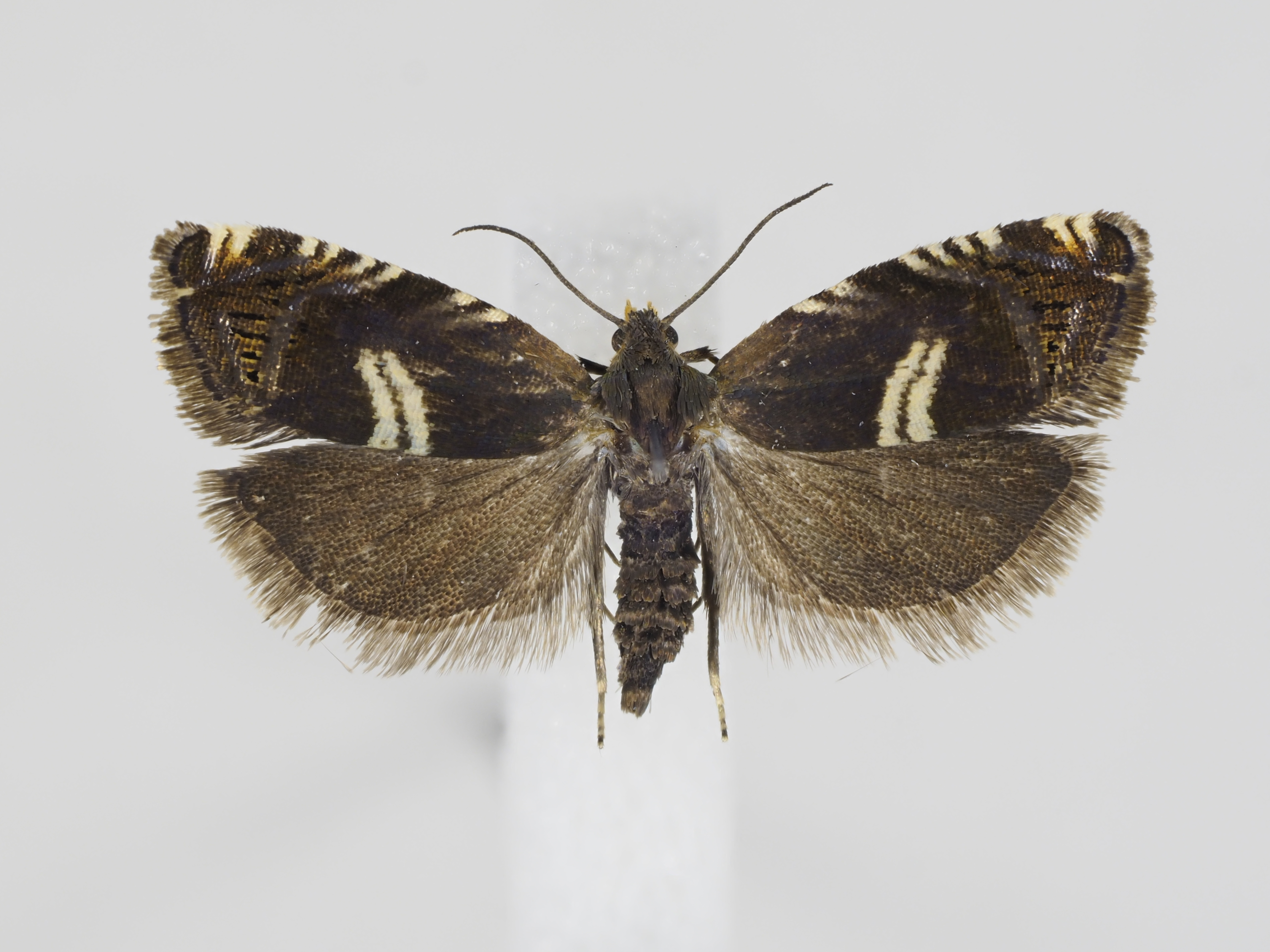

Scientific classification
- Domain: Eukaryota
- Kingdom: Animalia
- Phylum: Arthropoda
- Class: Insecta
- Order: Lepidoptera
- Family: Tortricidae
- Genus: Grapholita
- Species: G. fissana

Binomial name
- Grapholita fissana (Frolich, 1828)

= Grapholita fissana =

Species of moth

Grapholita fissana is a species of moth belonging to the family Tortricidae.

It is native to Europe.
