= Grapholita schizodelta =

Scientific classification
- Domain: Eukaryota
- Kingdom: Animalia
- Phylum: Arthropoda
- Class: Insecta
- Order: Lepidoptera
- Family: Tortricidae
- Genus: Grapholita
- Species: G. schizodelta

Binomial name
- Grapholita schizodelta Diakonoff, 1982

Species of moth

Grapholita schizodelta is a moth of the family Tortricidae first described by Alexey Diakonoff in 1982. It is found in Sri Lanka.

The specific name is derived from Greek meaning "a split delta", referring to the Greek letter delta.

== Description ==
Female moths have a wingspan of 10 mm (0.39 in). The head is a light grey to ochre. The whitish pedipalps are porrect, pointed and straight. The thorax and abdomen are dark greyish brown. The dark greyish-brown forewings are oblong. The greyish-brown costa is gently curved, with seven pairs of very narrow white transverse lines. The apex is sub-rectangular. The middle dorsum has an equilateral triangular white spot. The hindwings are dark greyish brown with a purplish gloss. A pale basal line is present.
