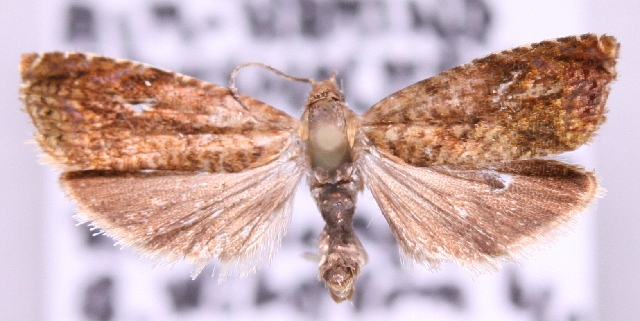

Scientific classification
- Kingdom: Animalia
- Phylum: Arthropoda
- Class: Insecta
- Order: Lepidoptera
- Family: Tortricidae
- Genus: Grapholita
- Species: G. lobarzewskii

Binomial name
- Grapholita lobarzewskii (Nowicki, 1860)

Synonyms
- Carpocapsa lobarzewskii Nowicki, 1860; Cydia lobarzewskii; Grapholitha prunivorana Ragonot, 1879

= Grapholita lobarzewskii =

Species of moth

Grapholita lobarzewskii, the appleseed moth, small fruit tortrix or smaller fruit tortrix moth, is a moth of the family Tortricidae. It was described by Maksymilian Nowicki in 1860. It is found in large parts of Europe, except Norway, the Iberian Peninsula and most of the Balkan Peninsula.

The wingspan is 13–14 mm. Adults are on wing from May to June.

The larvae feed within the fruit of Prunus and Malus species.
