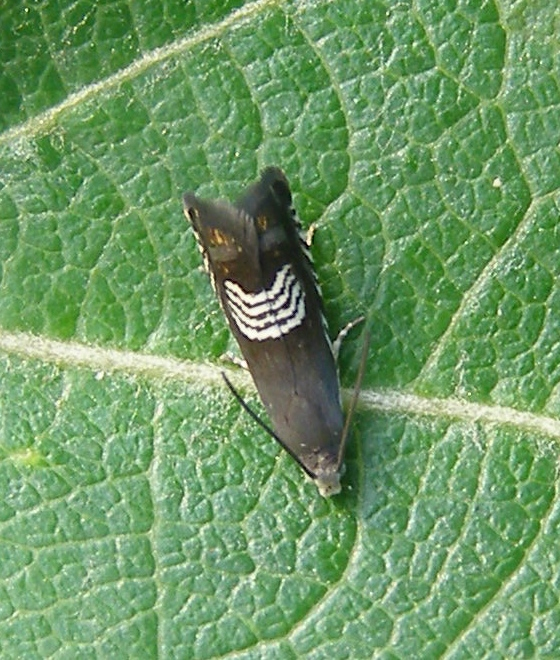

Scientific classification
- Kingdom: Animalia
- Phylum: Arthropoda
- Class: Insecta
- Order: Lepidoptera
- Family: Tortricidae
- Genus: Grapholita
- Species: G. compositella

Binomial name
- Grapholita compositella (Fabricius, 1775)

Synonyms
- Tinea compositella Fabricius, 1775; Pyralis composana Fabricius, 1798; Tortrix gundiana Hubner, [1796-1799]; Euspila simillimana Toll, 1953

= Grapholita compositella =

Species of moth

Grapholita compositella, the clover seed moth, is a moth of the family Tortricidae. It is found from Europe to Asia Minor, Mongolia, China and eastern Russia, and in North America.

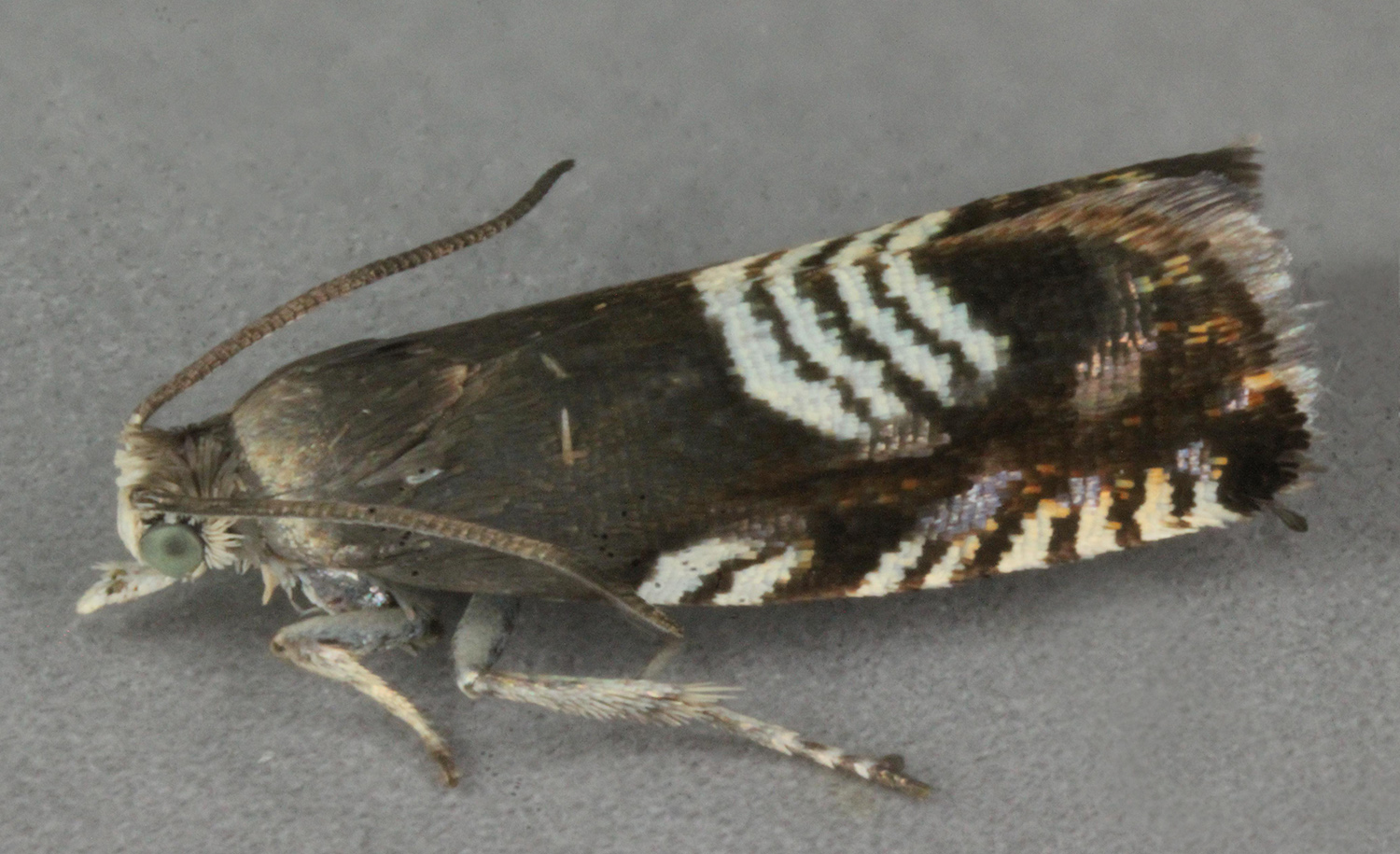

The wingspan is 8–10 mm. The face and palpi are white. The forewings are dark fuscous. The costa has eight long white strigulae, several ending in leaden-metallic marks.There is a slightly curved broad quadrate whitish median dorsal blotch, with three parallel blackish lines, surmounted by a leaden-metallic mark. The ocellus is represented by a leaden - metallic transverse mark. The hindwings in the male are white, the apex broadly fuscous; in the femalethey are dark fuscous, lighter basally.

There are two generations per year, with adults on wing in May and June and again in August. Males fly during the day, while females fly towards sunset.

The larvae feed on Trifolium species, including Trifolium pratense and Trifolium repens. They have also been recorded on Glycine max, Medicago sativa, Melilotus, Lotus corniculatus and other Leguminosae species.
