= Grapholita hymenosa =

Scientific classification
- Kingdom: Animalia
- Phylum: Arthropoda
- Class: Insecta
- Order: Lepidoptera
- Family: Tortricidae
- Genus: Grapholita
- Species: G. hymenosa

Binomial name
- Grapholita hymenosa Razowski, 2013

Species of moth

Grapholita hymenosa is a moth of the family Tortricidae. It is found in Nigeria.

The wingspan is about 12 mm.

== Etymology ==
The species name is derived from Greek hymen (meaning a membrane).
