= Nová Říše =

- Market town
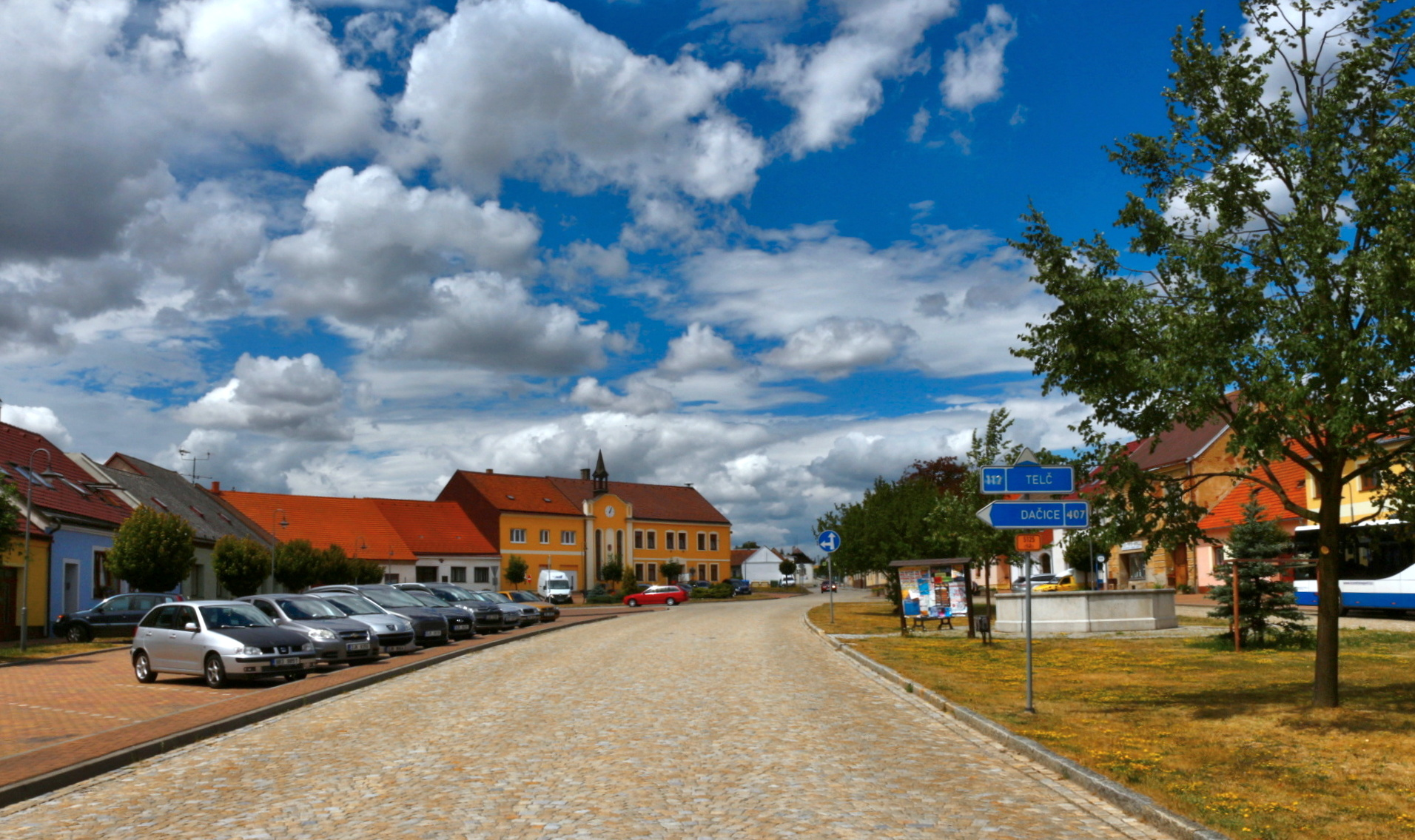
- Town square with the town hall

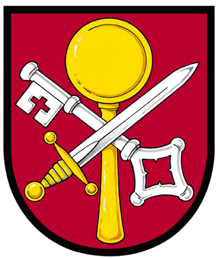
- Flag Coat of arms

- Location in the Czech Republic
- Coordinates: 49°8′22″N 15°33′49″E
- Country: Czech Republic
- Region: Vysočina
- District: Jihlava
- First mentioned: 1248

Area
  - Total: 7.85 km^{2} (3.03 sq mi)
- Elevation: 536 m (1,759 ft)

Population (2026-01-01)
  - Total: 851
  - Density: 108/km^{2} (281/sq mi)
- Time zone: UTC+1 (CET)
  - Summer (DST): UTC+2 (CEST)
- Postal code: 588 65
- Website: www.novarise.cz

Nová Říše (Czech pronunciation: [ˈnovaː ˈr̝iːʃɛ]; German: Neureisch) is a market town in Jihlava District in the Vysočina Region of the Czech Republic. It has about 900 inhabitants.

== Geography ==
Nová Říše is located about 28 kilometres (17 mi) south of Jihlava. It lies in the Křižanov Highlands. The highest point is the hill Polanka at 625 m (2,051 ft) above sea level. The Vápovka Stream flows through the municipality. The Nová Říše Reservoir is located just outside the municipal territory.

== History ==
According to legend, the Premonstrate monastery in Nová Říše was founded in 1211. It is first documented in 1248. In 1354, Nová Říše was first mentioned as a market town.

During World War II, the monastery was ambushed by Nazis. Five members of the community were killed in Auschwitz concentration camp. Surviving monks were sentenced to prison and labour camps by the Communists in 1950. The buildings were given back to the Order after the fall of Communism in 1991.

== Demographics ==
Historical population

Year	Pop.	±%
1869	1,149	—
1880	1,170	+1.8%
1890	1,161	−0.8%
1900	1,115	−4.0%
1910	1,129	+1.3%

Year	Pop.	±%
1921	1,161	+2.8%
1930	1,066	−8.2%
1950	841	−21.1%
1961	918	+9.2%
1970	853	−7.1%

Year	Pop.	±%
1980	787	−7.7%
1991	776	−1.4%
2001	798	+2.8%
2011	834	+4.5%
2021	811	−2.8%

Source: Censuses

== Transport ==
There are no railways or major roads passing through the municipality.

== Sights ==
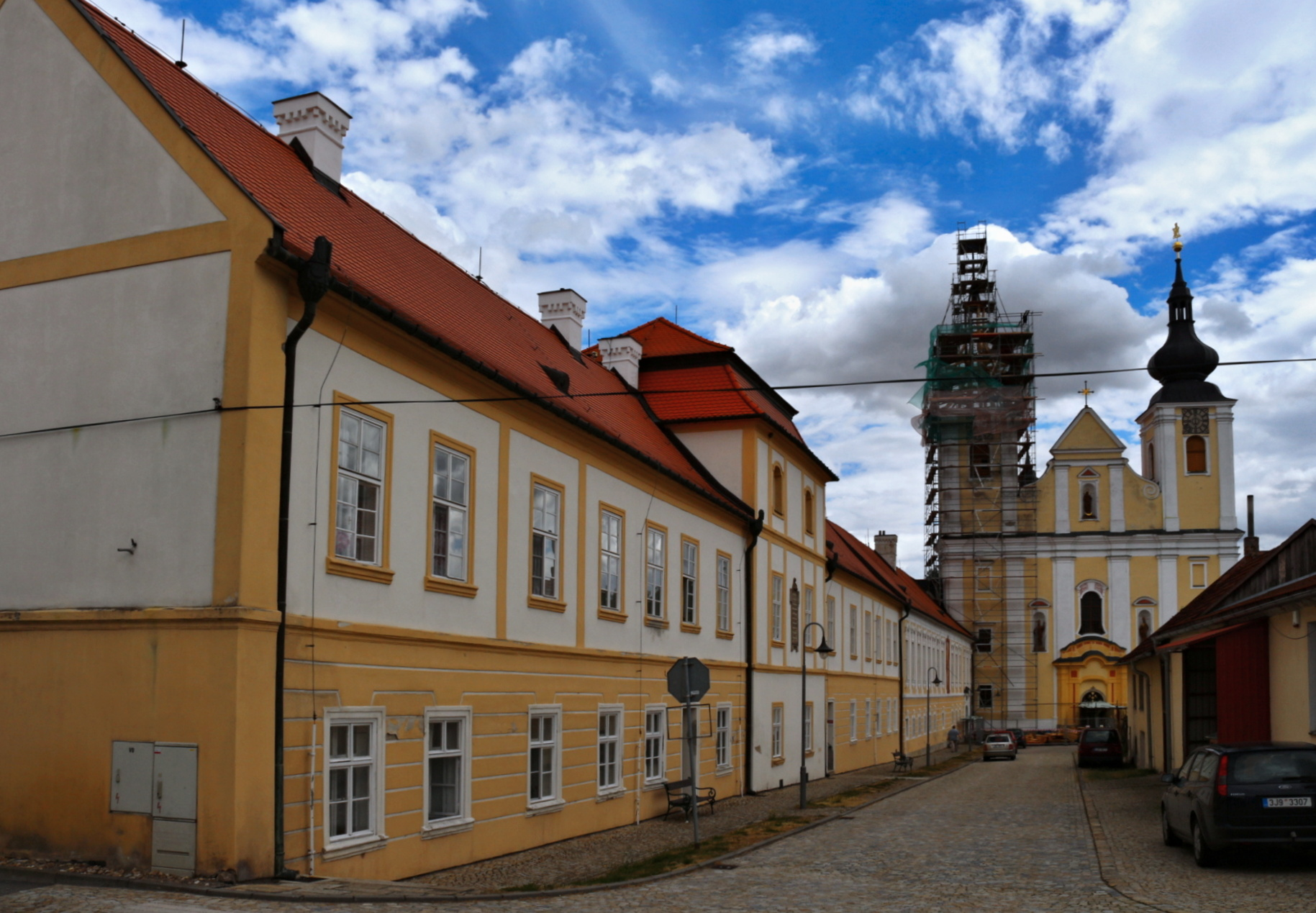
Church of Saints Peter and Paul and the monastery

The most important monument is the Monastery of the Virgin Mary. After it was damaged by a fire in 1813, it was rebuilt in the Baroque style in 1821. The monastery is connected with the neighbouring Church of Saints Peter and Paul.

== Notable people ==
- Paul Wranitzky (1756–1808), composer
- Antonín Vranický (1761–1820), violinist and composer
- Charles Bacik (1910–1991), glass manufacturer
- Jan Novák (1921–1984), composer
