= Grapholita dysaethria =

Scientific classification
- Domain: Eukaryota
- Kingdom: Animalia
- Phylum: Arthropoda
- Class: Insecta
- Order: Lepidoptera
- Family: Tortricidae
- Genus: Grapholita
- Species: G. dysaethria

Binomial name
- Grapholita dysaethria Diakonoff, 1982

Species of moth

Grapholita dysaethria is a moth of the family Tortricidae first described by Alexey Diakonoff in 1982. It is found in Sri Lanka.

== Description ==
Male and female moths are only slightly different. Males have a wingspan of 9–10.5 mm (0.35–0.41 in). In males, the head is slightly tufted across the forehead, both of which are dark grey brown to purplish. The antennae are thick and dark greyish brown. The pedipalps are long, moderately curved, and porrect. The thorax and abdomen area is deeply purplish to grey brown. The forewings are nearly ovate with and have curved grey-brown costa with seven pale markings. The apex and termen are round. The forewings are deeply purplish to grey brown. The ocelloid spot is moderate, greyish brown to purple, and has four black transverse marks. The forewing cilia are ash grey to brown and glossy with a black basal line. The hindwings are grey brown, with creamy-white cilia.

Female moths are similar to males, with a wingspan of 10–12 mm (0.39–0.47 in). The female dorsal spot is more distinct, formed by three pale greyish parallel oblique streaks. The forewing and hindwing colouration is similar to male colouration. The head slightly paler and more grey than that of the male.
