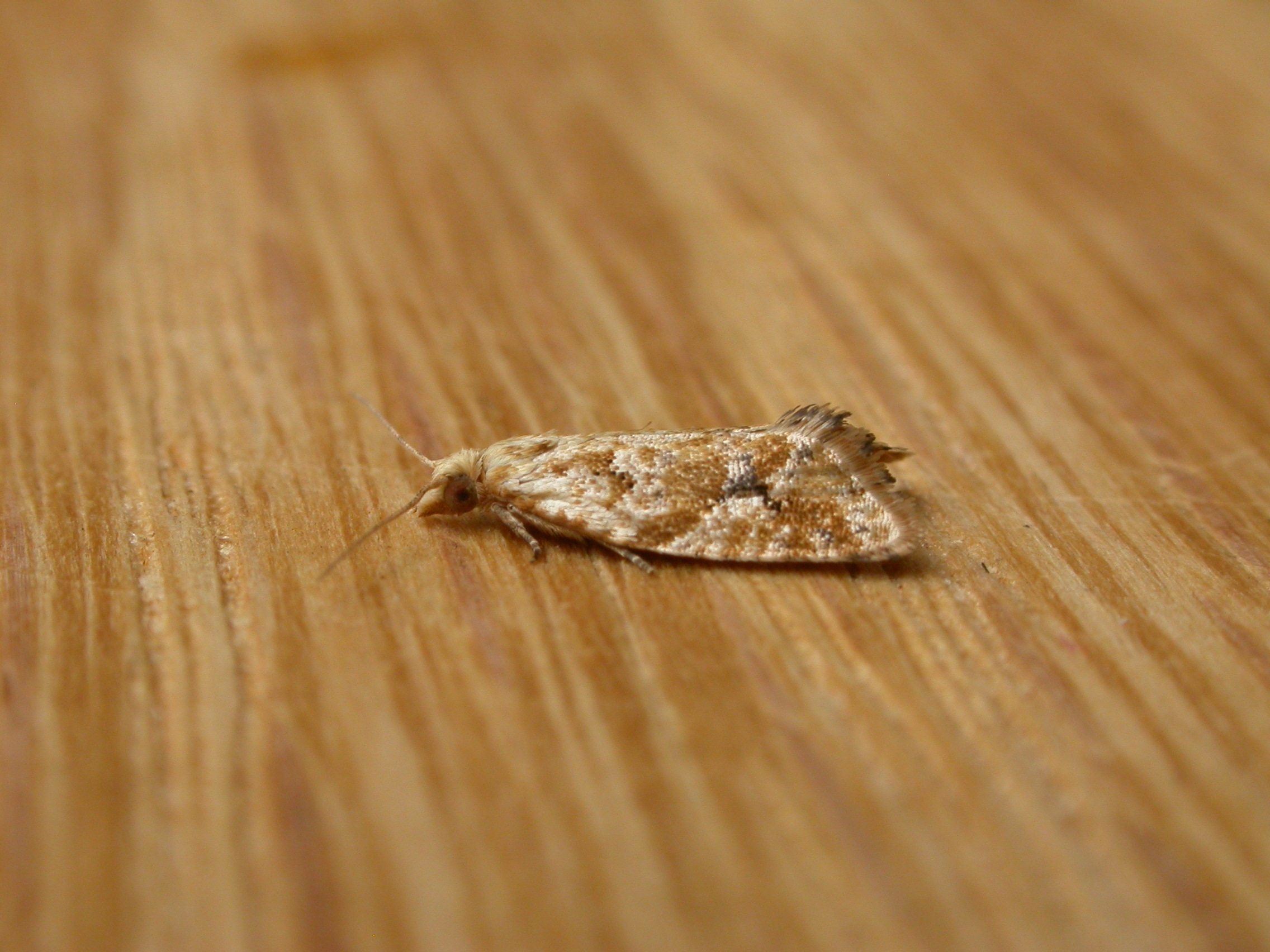

Scientific classification
- Kingdom: Animalia
- Phylum: Arthropoda
- Class: Insecta
- Order: Lepidoptera
- Family: Tortricidae
- Genus: Grapholita
- Species: G. decolorana

Binomial name
- Grapholita decolorana Walker, 1863

= Grapholita decolorana =

Species of moth

Grapholita decolorana is a species of moth of the family Tortricidae. It is found in Australia.

== Biology ==
As caterpillars, they feed on dead eucalyptus leaves.

Mature G. decolorana are cream in color, with complex brown patterns on the forewings. They have a wingspan of approximately 1.5 centimetres (0.59 in).

The species is known to excrete the semiochemical (Z)-5-tetradecenyl acetate.

== Distribution ==
G. decolorana has been found in New South Wales and Victoria, as well as the Australian Capital Territory.
