= Grapholita isacma =

Scientific classification
- Kingdom: Animalia
- Phylum: Arthropoda
- Class: Insecta
- Order: Lepidoptera
- Family: Tortricidae
- Genus: Grapholita
- Species: G. isacma

Binomial name
- Grapholita isacma Meyrick, 1907

Species of moth

Grapholita isacma is a moth of the family Tortricidae first described by Edward Meyrick in 1907. It is found in Sri Lanka and India.
