= Grapholita obliqua =

Scientific classification
- Kingdom: Animalia
- Phylum: Arthropoda
- Class: Insecta
- Order: Lepidoptera
- Family: Tortricidae
- Genus: Grapholita
- Species: G. obliqua

Binomial name
- Grapholita obliqua Diakonoff, 1982

Moth in the family Tortricidae from Sri Lanka

Grapholita obliqua is a moth of the family Tortricidae first described by Alexey Diakonoff in 1982. It is found in Sri Lanka.

== Description ==
Females have a wingspan of 9 mm (0.35 in). The moths have a creamy-white head. The antennae are a light grey brown. Pedipalps are appressed and slightly curved. The thorax is reddish yellow to a light tawny. The abdomen is lightly grey brown. The forewings are oblong. The costa is gradually curved and the apex is obtusely pointed. The forewings are a light tawny. Two faint brown horizontal short striae can be found above the eyespot. The creamy-white cilia are pale and tawny with a sprinkling of brown. A minute glossy silvery basal line is present. The hindwings are creamy and densely dusted with a light tawny colouring.
