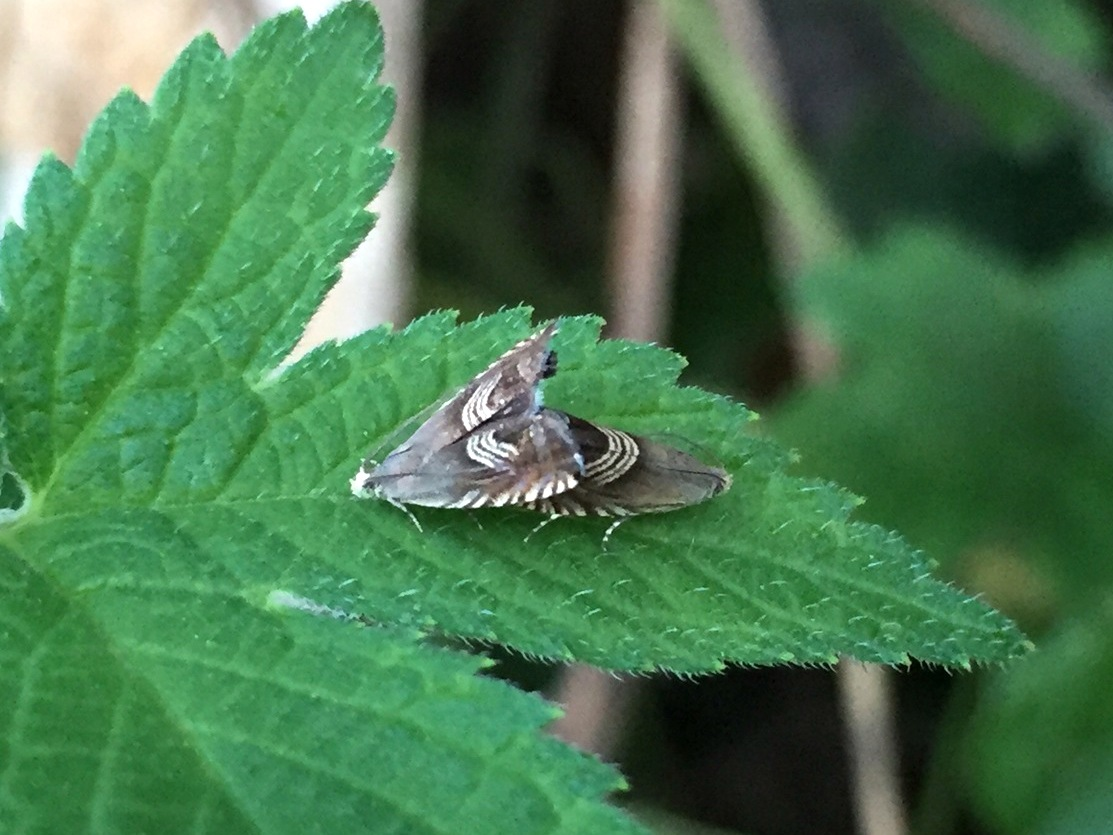
- Grapholita delineana on a leaf

Scientific classification
- Kingdom: Animalia
- Phylum: Arthropoda
- Class: Insecta
- Order: Lepidoptera
- Family: Tortricidae
- Genus: Grapholita
- Species: G. delineana

Binomial name
- Grapholita delineana Walker, 1863

= Grapholita delineana =

Species of insect

Grapholita delineana, known generally as Eurasian hemp moth, is a species of tortricid moth in the family Tortricidae. Other common names include the hemp moth and hemp borer.

The MONA or Hodges number for Grapholita delineana is 3443.1.
