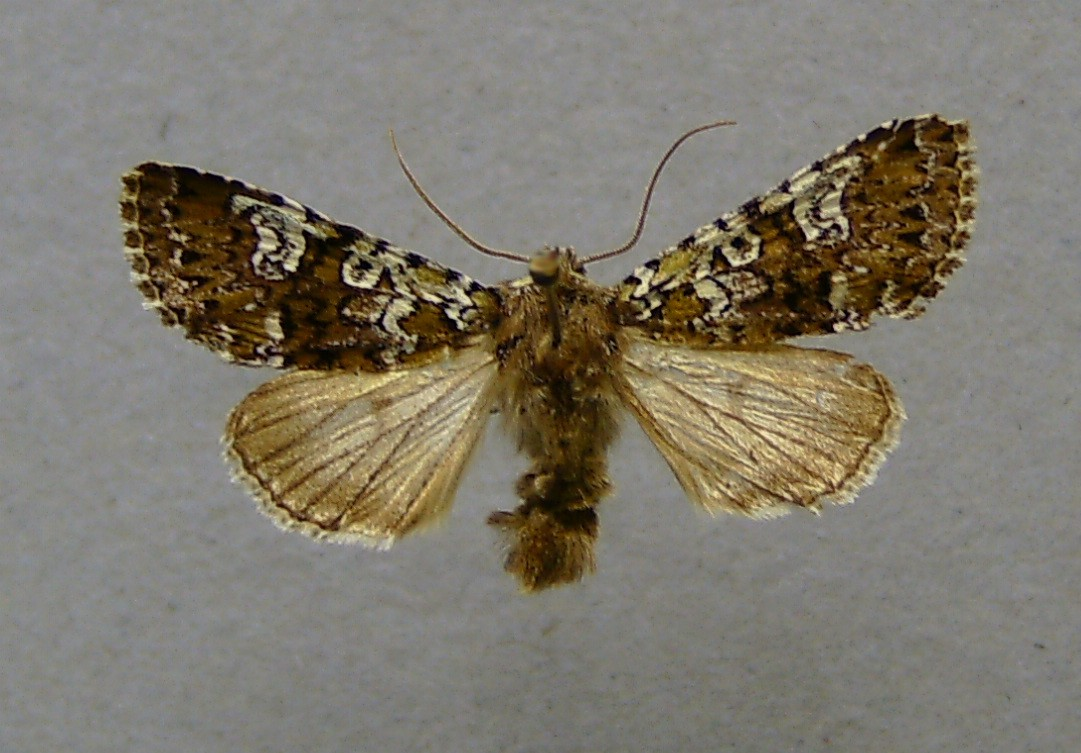

Scientific classification
- Domain: Eukaryota
- Kingdom: Animalia
- Phylum: Arthropoda
- Class: Insecta
- Order: Lepidoptera
- Superfamily: Noctuoidea
- Family: Noctuidae
- Subfamily: Xyleninae
- Genus: Crypsedra; Warren, 1911

= Crypsedra =

Genus of moths

Crypsedra is a genus of moths of the family Noctuidae. It consists of only one species:

- Crypsedra gemmea (Treitschke, 1825)
