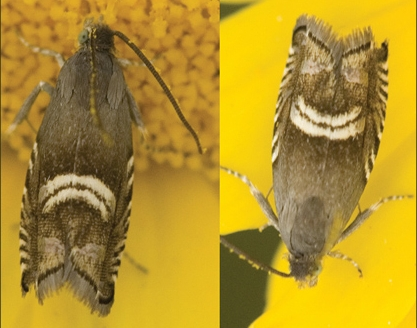

Scientific classification
- Kingdom: Animalia
- Phylum: Arthropoda
- Clade: Pancrustacea
- Class: Insecta
- Order: Lepidoptera
- Family: Tortricidae
- Genus: Grapholita
- Species: G. internana

Binomial name
- Grapholita internana (Guenée, 1845)

Synonyms
- Stigmonota internana Guenee, 1845; Enarmonia internana f. divisella Dufrane, 1960; Stigmonota erectana Barrett, 1875; Enarmonia internana f. flexuosella Dufrane, 1960; Euspila internana tristana Toll, 1953

= Grapholita internana =

Species of moth

Grapholita internana is a moth of the family Tortricidae. It is found in most of Europe, except the Balkan Peninsula and Fennoscandia.

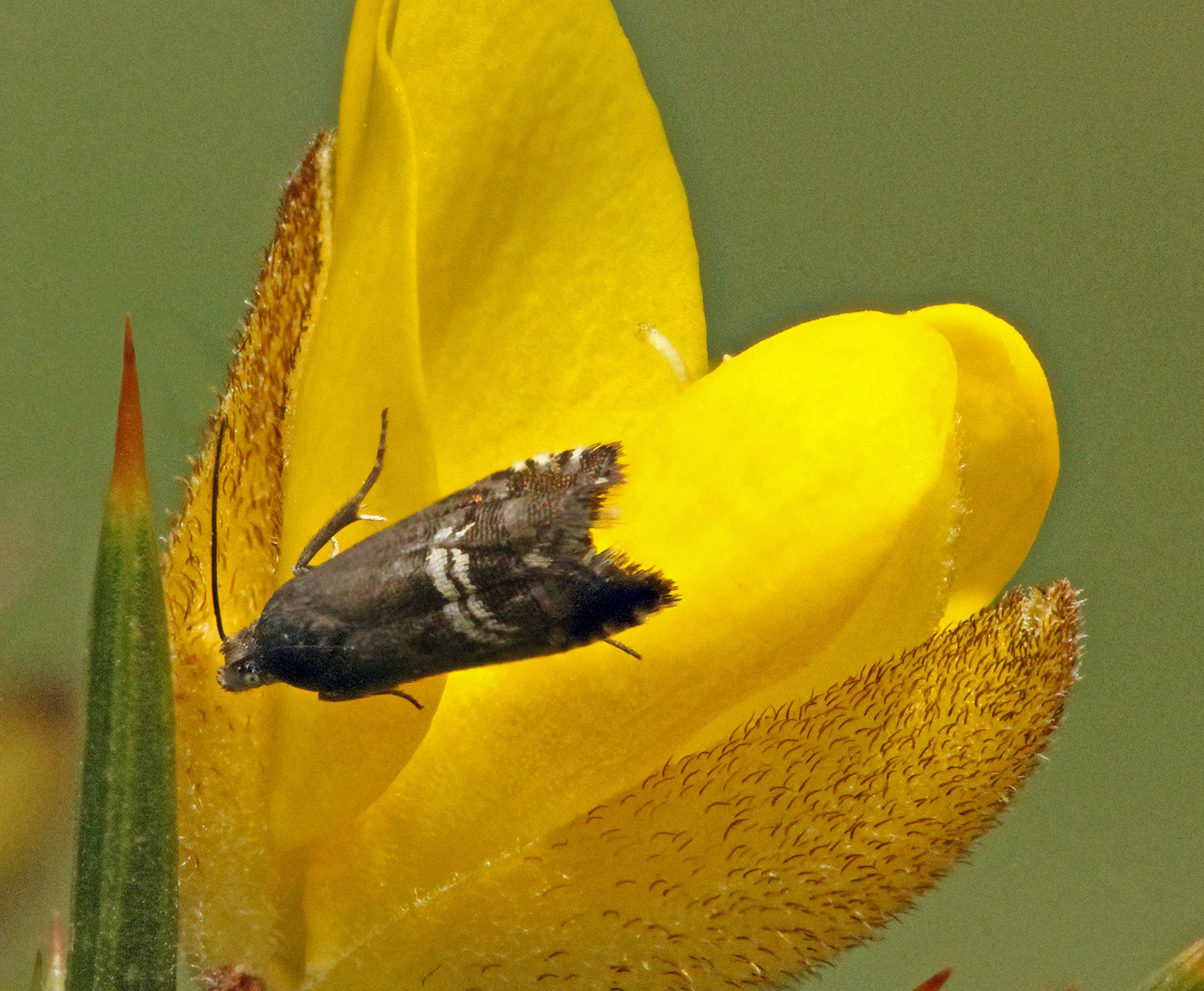

The wingspan is 9–10 mm.The forewings are dark fuscous . The costa has eight rather long white strigulae, some ending in violet-silvery metallic marks. There is a narrow curved whitish median dorsal blotch, with dark fuscous lighter basally. A central line. The ocellus is represented by a violet-silvery-metallic transverse mark. The hindwings in the male are white, the apex narrowly dark fuscous; in the female they are dark fuscous, paler basally.

Adults are on wing from April to June.

The larvae feed on the seeds within seedpods of Ulex europaeus.
