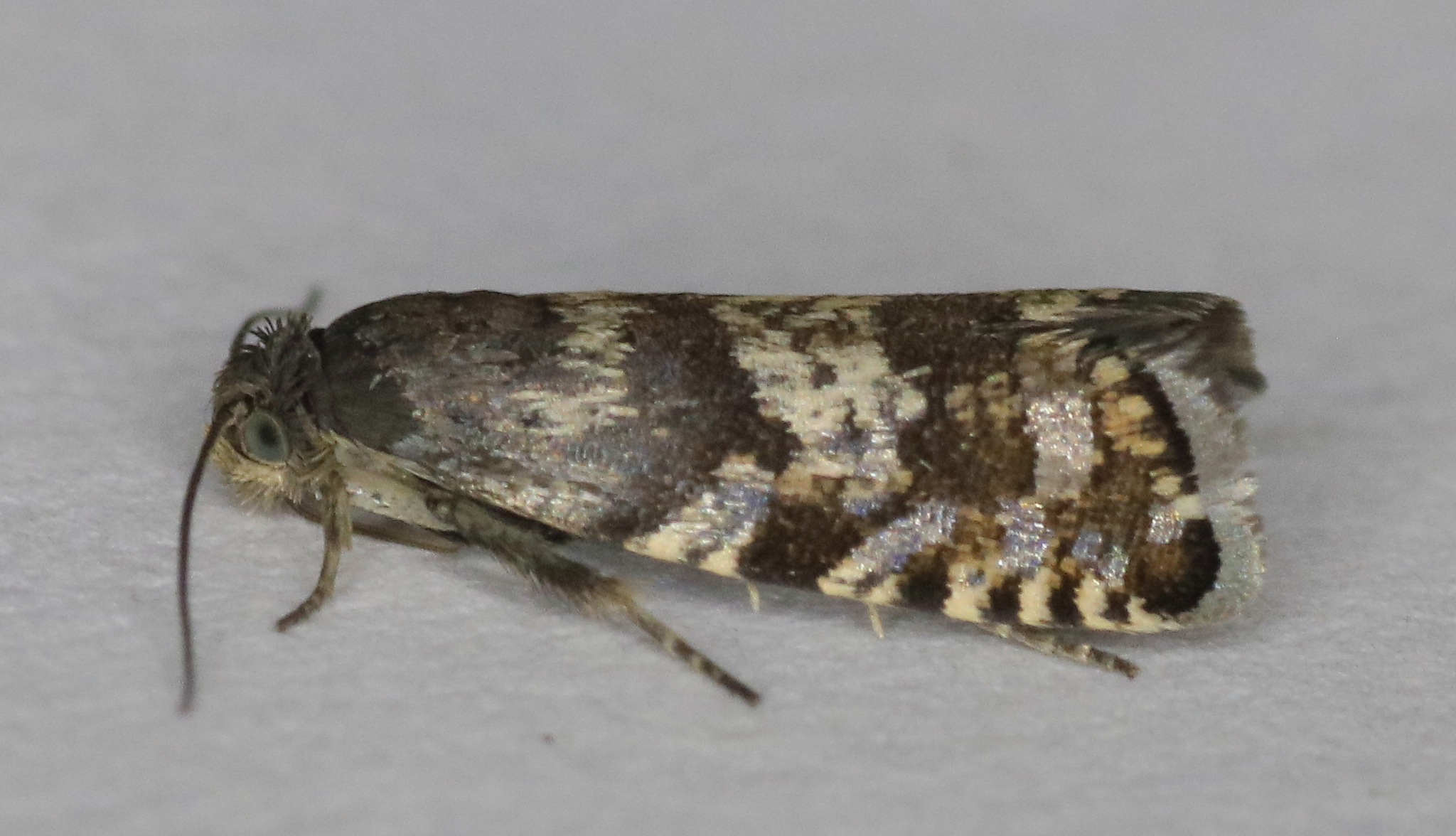

Scientific classification
- Kingdom: Animalia
- Phylum: Arthropoda
- Class: Insecta
- Order: Lepidoptera
- Family: Tortricidae
- Genus: Grapholita
- Species: G. aureolana

Binomial name
- Grapholita aureolana Tengstrom, 1848

= Grapholita aureolana =

Species of moth

Grapholita aureolana is a species of moth belonging to the family Tortricidae.

It is native to Europe and North America.
