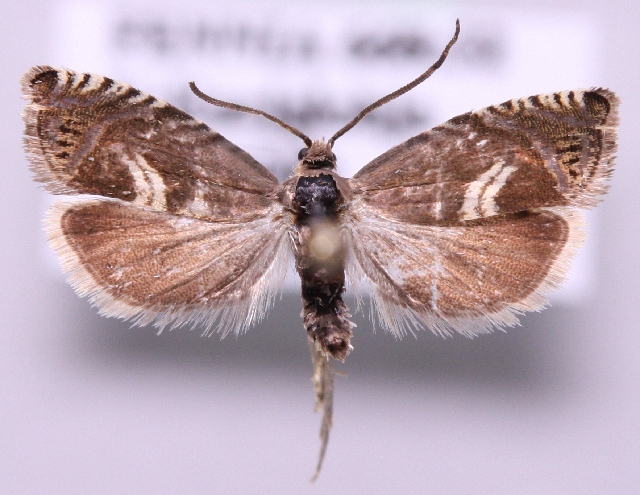

Scientific classification
- Kingdom: Animalia
- Phylum: Arthropoda
- Class: Insecta
- Order: Lepidoptera
- Family: Tortricidae
- Genus: Grapholita
- Species: G. discretana

Binomial name
- Grapholita discretana Wocke, 1861

Synonyms
- Grapholitha geniculana Laharpe, 1858; Cydia discretana

= Grapholita discretana =

Species of moth

Grapholita discretana is a moth of the family Tortricidae. It was described by Maximilian Ferdinand Wocke in 1861. It is found in most of Europe, except Great Britain, Ireland, the Iberian Peninsula and most of the Balkan Peninsula.

The wingspan is 15–19 mm. Adults are recorded on the wing from May to June.

The larvae feed on Humulus lupulus. The species overwinters in the larval stage.
