= Grapholita amphitorna =

Scientific classification
- Kingdom: Animalia
- Phylum: Arthropoda
- Class: Insecta
- Order: Lepidoptera
- Family: Tortricidae
- Genus: Grapholita
- Species: G. amphitorna

Binomial name
- Grapholita amphitorna (Turner, 1916)

Synonyms
- Laspeyresia amphitorna Turner, 1916

Species of moth

Grapholita amphitorna is a species of moth of the family Tortricidae. It is found in Australia, where it has been recorded from Queensland.

The wingspan is about 10 mm. The forewings are brownish fuscous, with a dull purple lustre towards the costa. The costa is strigulated (finely streaked) with ochreous whitish. The hindwings are fuscous, with some brown suffusion in the middle of the disc.
