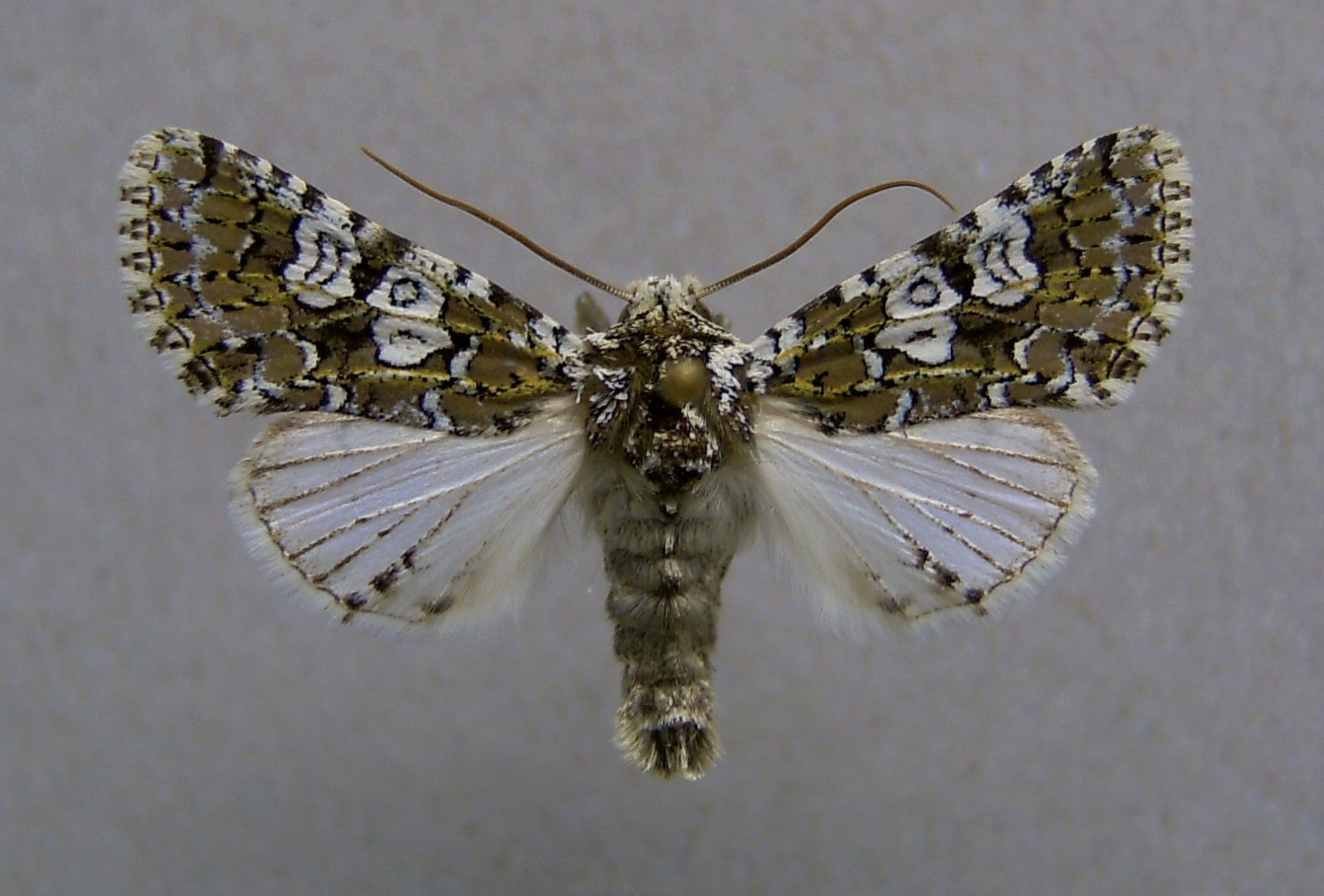

Scientific classification
- Kingdom: Animalia
- Phylum: Arthropoda
- Clade: Pancrustacea
- Class: Insecta
- Order: Lepidoptera
- Superfamily: Noctuoidea
- Family: Noctuidae
- Subfamily: Cuculliinae
- Genus: Lamprosticta; Hübner, 1820

= Lamprosticta =

Genus of moths

Lamprosticta is a genus of moths of the family Noctuidae.

== Species ==
- Lamprosticta culta (Denis & Schiffermüller, 1775)
