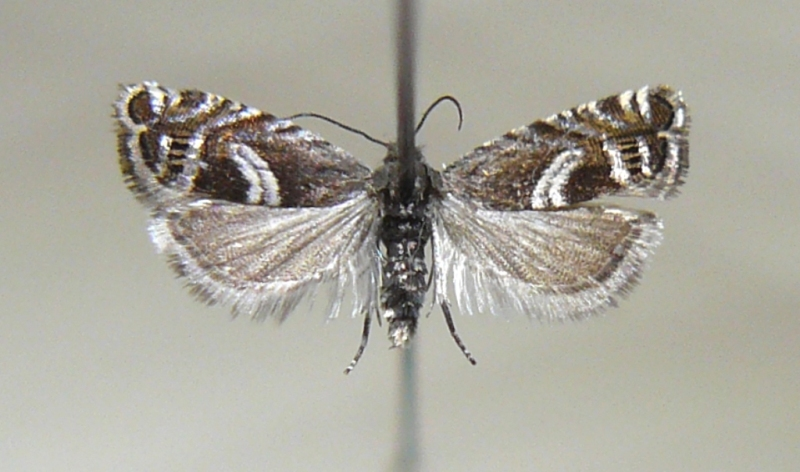

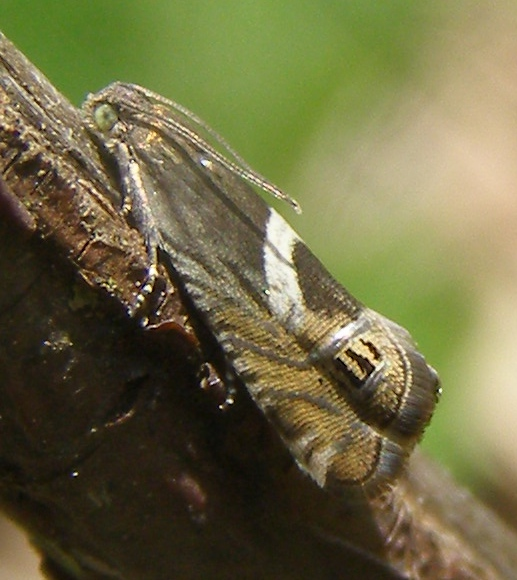

Scientific classification
- Kingdom: Animalia
- Phylum: Arthropoda
- Class: Insecta
- Order: Lepidoptera
- Family: Tortricidae
- Genus: Grapholita
- Species: G. jungiella

Binomial name
- Grapholita jungiella (Clerck, 1759)

Synonyms
- Phalaena jungiella Clerck, 1759; Stigmonota albisecundella Bruand, 1847; Stigmonota jungiana Guenee, 1845; Grapholitha loderana Kollar, 1832; Tortrix perlepidana Haworth, [1811]; Tortrix schrankiana Frolich, 1828

= Grapholita jungiella =

Species of moth

Grapholita jungiella is a moth of the family Tortricidae. It is found in most of Europe (except Iceland, the Iberian Peninsula, most of the Balkan Peninsula and Ukraine), east to the Near East and the eastern part of the Palearctic realm.

The wingspan is 10–13 mm.The forewings are fuscous, the dorsal half dark fuscous, the apical third pale yellow - ochreous. The costa is strigulated with dark fuscous and white. There is a long narrow curved whitish median dorsal blotch, with a dark fuscous central line. Three streaks from the costa posteriorly and the margins of the ocellus are silvery-leaden-metallic. There are several black dashes in the ocellus. The hindwings in the male are white, the apex and costa fuscous; in the female they are fuscous.

Adults are on wing from April to May. Depending on the location, there are either one or two generations.

The larvae feed on Lathyrus linifolius and Vicia sepium.
