= Grapholita zariae =

Scientific classification
- Kingdom: Animalia
- Phylum: Arthropoda
- Class: Insecta
- Order: Lepidoptera
- Family: Tortricidae
- Genus: Grapholita
- Species: G. zariae

Binomial name
- Grapholita zariae Razowski, 2013

Species of moth

Grapholita zariae is a moth of the family Tortricidae. It is found in Nigeria.

The wingspan is about 11 mm.

== Etymology ==
The species name refers to Zaria, the type locality.
