= Grapholita andabatana =

Scientific classification
- Kingdom: Animalia
- Phylum: Arthropoda
- Class: Insecta
- Order: Lepidoptera
- Family: Tortricidae
- Genus: Grapholita
- Species: G. andabatana

Binomial name
- Grapholita andabatana (Wolff, 1957)

Synonyms
- Laspeyresia andabatana Wolff, 1957; Cydia andabatana

Species of moth

Grapholita andabatana is a moth of the family Tortricidae. It was described by Niels Laue Wolff in 1957. It is found in Denmark, France, Switzerland, Austria, Italy, Slovakia, Poland and Russia.

The wingspan is 10–12 mm. Adults are on wing from June to July.

The larvae feed on Sorbus species. They feed on the fruit of their host plant.
