= Grapholita gypsothicta =

Scientific classification
- Kingdom: Animalia
- Phylum: Arthropoda
- Clade: Pancrustacea
- Class: Insecta
- Order: Lepidoptera
- Family: Tortricidae
- Genus: Grapholita
- Species: G. gypsothicta

Binomial name
- Grapholita gypsothicta (Meyrick, 1938)

Synonyms
- Laspeyresia gypsothicta Meyrick, 1938

Species of moth

Grapholita gypsothicta is a species of moth of the family Tortricidae. It is found in the Democratic Republic of Congo.
