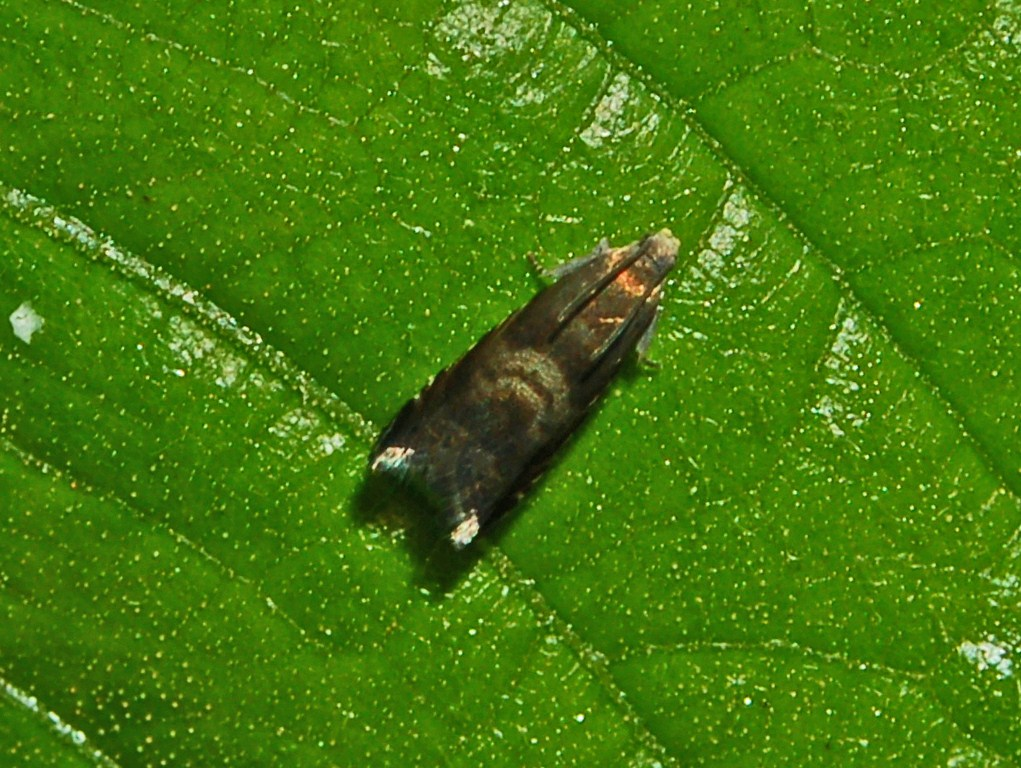

Scientific classification
- Kingdom: Animalia
- Phylum: Arthropoda
- Clade: Pancrustacea
- Class: Insecta
- Order: Lepidoptera
- Family: Tortricidae
- Genus: Grapholita
- Species: G. pallifrontana

Binomial name
- Grapholita pallifrontana (Lienig & Zeller, 1846)

Synonyms
- Cydia pallifrontana Karsholt & Razowski, 1996

= Grapholita pallifrontana =

Species of moth

Grapholita pallifrontana is a moth species of the family Tortricidae, subfamily Olethreutinae.

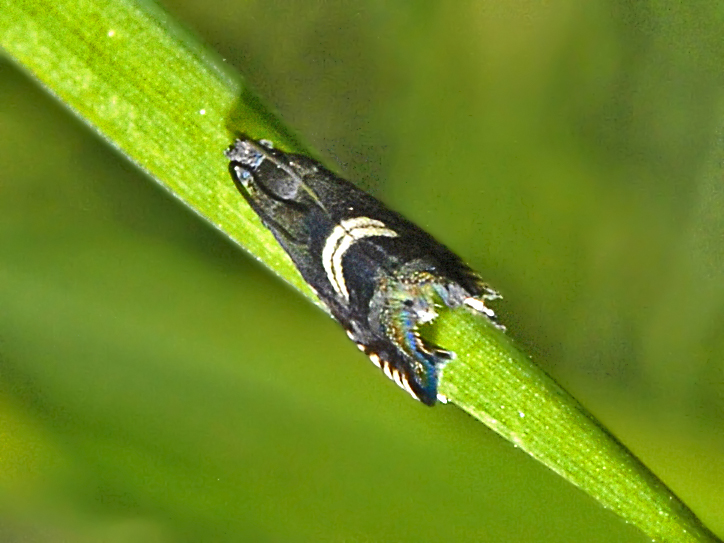
Grapholita cf. pallifrontana

== Distribution ==
It is found in most of Europe and the Near East.

== Habitats ==
These moths live in grassland and scrub, preferably on base soils.

== Description ==
The wingspan is about 9–12 millimetres (0.35–0.47 in). Forewings are brownish, with whitish dorsal blotch and costal markings. Hindwings of the males are infuscate (dark).

== Ecology ==
The larvae feed within seedpods of wild liquorice (Astragalus glycyphyllos). They overwinter in a cocoon. The adult moths fly from May until July.
