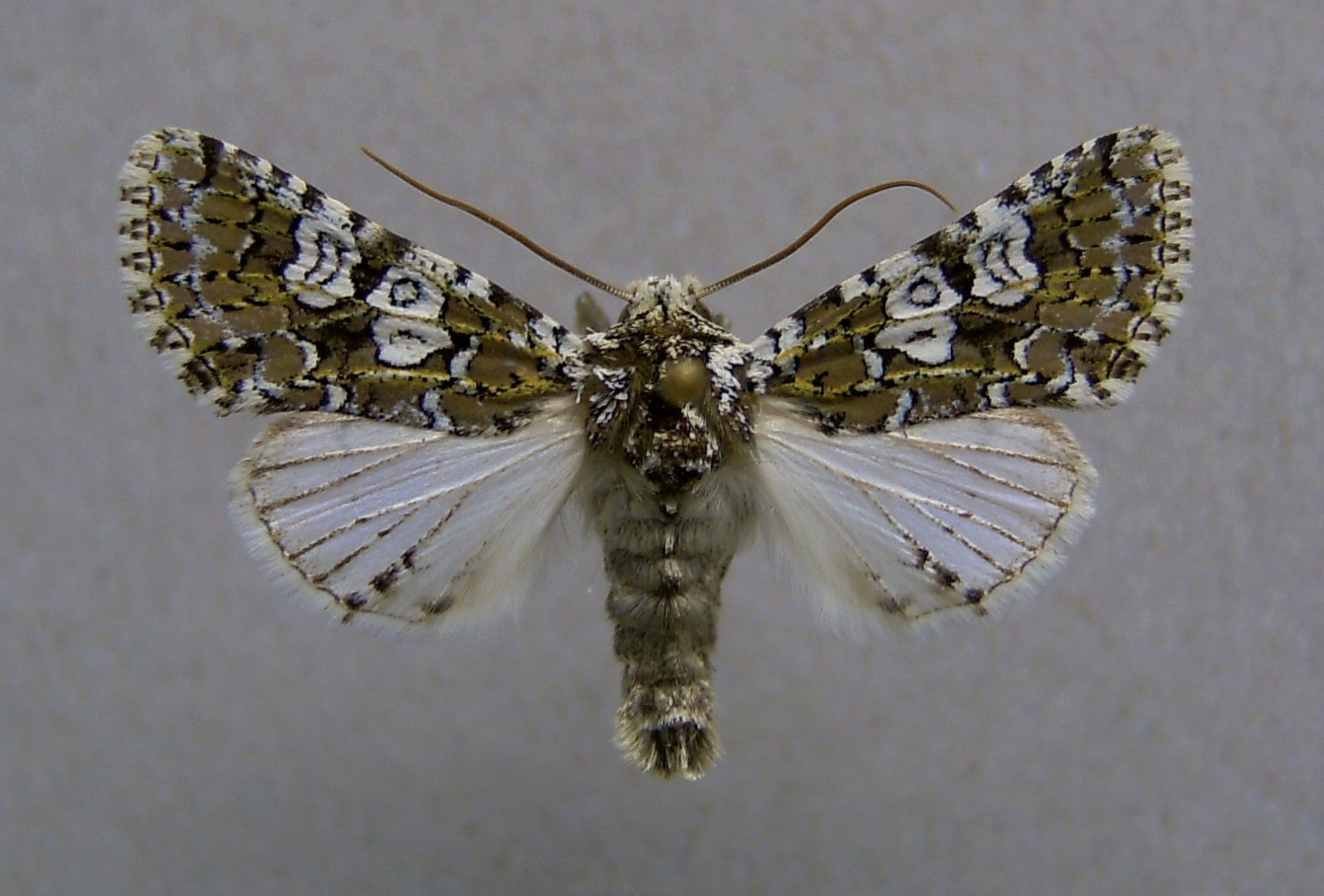

Scientific classification
- Domain: Eukaryota
- Kingdom: Animalia
- Phylum: Arthropoda
- Class: Insecta
- Order: Lepidoptera
- Superfamily: Noctuoidea
- Family: Noctuidae
- Genus: Lamprosticta
- Species: L. culta

Binomial name
- Lamprosticta culta (Denis & Schiffermüller, 1775)

Synonyms
- Noctua culta Denis & Schiffermüller, 1775; Phalaena (Noctua) viridana Walch, 1779; Chariptera viridana

= Lamprosticta culta =

Species of moth

Lamprosticta culta is a moth of the family Noctuidae. It is found from the Pyrenees to Ukraine and in Turkey.

The wingspan is 40–48 mm. Adults are on wing from June to July in one generation per year. Adults are attracted to flowers.

The larvae feed on the leaves of various trees and shrubs, including Prunus spinosa, Crataegus species and Fruit trees. Larvae are found from August to September.

== Subspecies ==
- Lamprosticta culta culta (Pyrenees to Ukraine and the coastal areas of the Aegean Sea and western Anatolia)
- Lamprosticta culta albescens Hacker, 1990 (western parts of the Taurus Mountains)
- Lamprosticta culta coeruleuca Ronkay & Ronkay, 1995 (Turkey: Bitlis Province)
- Lamprosticta culta plumbitincta Ronkay & Ronkay, 1995 (Turkey: Erzurum Province and Erzincan Province)
