= Grapholita caecana =

Scientific classification
- Kingdom: Animalia
- Phylum: Arthropoda
- Class: Insecta
- Order: Lepidoptera
- Family: Tortricidae
- Genus: Grapholita
- Species: G. caecana

Binomial name
- Grapholita caecana Schläger, 1847

Species of moth

Grapholita caecana is a moth belonging to the family Tortricidae, first described by F. Schläger in 1847 and native to Eurasia.
