= Antonín Vranický =

Czech violinist and composer

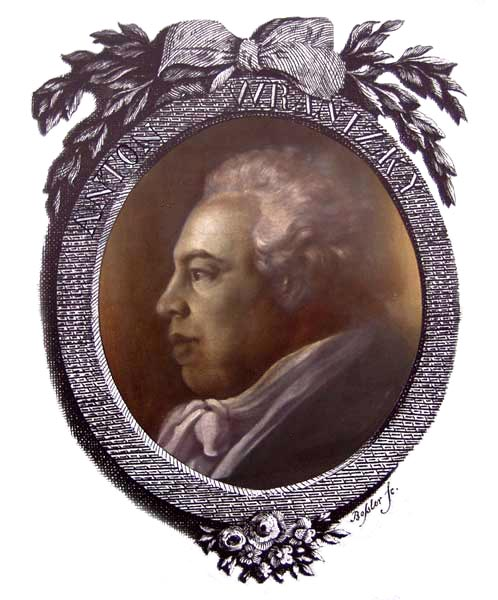
Violinist Antonín Vranický

Antonín Vranický, Germanized as Anton Wranitzky, and also seen as Wranizky (13 June 1761 – 6 August 1820), was a Czech violinist and composer of the 18th century. He was the half brother of Pavel Vranický.

== Training and career ==
Born in Nová Říše, he first studied philosophy in Olomouc and then law and music in Brno from 1778 to 1782.

He was a pupil of Mozart, Haydn and Albrechtsberger, as mentioned in a letter from Pavel Vranický to the music publisher André. Then, he returned to the service of Prince Joseph Franz von Lobkowitz of Bohemia, the future patron of Beethoven, and became Lobkowitz's chapel master in 1797. In 1799, he participated in the first performance of Haydn's The Creation.

In June 1804, he performed the first performance of Beethoven's Triple Concerto. In 1807 he was Orchestra director of the Theater am Kärntnertor (the Vienna Court Theater). In 1814, he became director of the Theater an der Wien. He died in Vienna.

== Worklist (incomplete) ==
=== With opus number ===
- Op. 1 Three string quartets. Published by Hofmeister around 1803. (These dates not necessarily those of their first editions- more likely republications.)
- Op. 2 Three string quartets. (in C, F and B♭) Published in Vienna by Magazin du Musique around 1790. (Duke University Library has a copy.)
- Op. 4 Three string quartets.
- Op. 5 Six string quartets. Published by André, around 1800.
- Op. 6 Sonatas for violin with the accompaniment of a bass (A copy is in a library in the Hague.)
- Op. 7 Variations for 2 violins. (Published by André in 1807. For source see op. 6.)
- Op. 8 String quintets (with two cellos). Of these no. 2 in G minor was republished in a collection of classical string quintets by Schott in Mainz in 2005, along with quintets by František Krommer, Franz Anton Hoffmeister, Ignaz Pleyel, Giuseppe Cambini, Johann Evangelist Brandl, Václav Pichl, Gaetano Brunetti, Antonio Capuzzi, Florian Leopold Gassmann and Francesco Zanetti. André published the set as "Drei Quintetten fûr eine Violine, zwei Violen und zwei Violoncelle ... 8tes. Werk." in 1802.
- Op. 9 Duos for 2 violins. (Published in 1804 by Imbault. See op. 6.)
- Op. 10 String quintet for violin, two violas and two cellos. (published 1803, republished 1996)
- Op. 11. Concerto (no. 7?) for violin in C major. Published by Duhan in 1804. Republished in a more recent edition in 1958 by Český hudební found in Prague.
- Op. 20 Three duos for two violins (republished by Walhall in Magdeburg, in 2002)
- Op. 56 Two sonatas for violin with bass

=== Possibly without opus number ===
- "Musique du carrousel éxécuté par la noblesse de Vienne" (about 1803.)
- Twenty Variations for two violins. (published in 1791 in Vienna by Magazin de musique)
- Cassatio in F major for five violas or four violas and bassoon (Rarities for Strings Publications in Bristol, Conn., 1979.)
- Duet for violin and cello in C minor. (Medici Music Press in Bellingham, Washington, c1985. Edited by T. Donley Thomas.)
- Duet for violin and cello in G minor. (Medici Music Press in Bellingham, Washington, c1985.)
- Symphonies including:
  - Symphony in C minor, C4; edited by Eva Hennigová-Dubová and published in The Symphony in Hungary, The Symphony, 1720-1840. Series B; v. 12. New York : Garland Publishing, Inc., 1984.
  - Symphony in D, also edited by Eva Hennigová, released in the series Maestri antichi boemi in 1976.
  - Symphony in C major from 1796 Aphrodite recorded by Vladimír Válek and the Dvořák Chamber Orchestra.
- Trio for two oboes and English horn in C major. Modern publisher: Basel, Switzerland : Edition Kneusslin, c1982. (Has been recorded.)
- Echo-Sonate in D major for 4 flutes; modern publisher: Zimmermann in Frankfurt, 2000
- Trio in E♭ nos. 1-3, for violin, viola and horn (Hanz Pizka Edition in Kirchheim, 1997)
- Concertos in A and in B♭ for violin and orchestra. (The latter published in piano reduction in 1944 by Artia, the former, in an edition edited by Jindřich Feld, was published in 1933 by Z. Vlk in Prague as "concerto no. 14" suggesting that there may be at least 12 others still.
- A violin concerto in B♭ for violin by Antonin Vranicky - as "Anton Wranitzky"- was published by Musica Antiqua Bohemica in 1965 in piano reduction. WorldCat link. OCLC 4267429.
- Cello Concerto in D minor. Recorded by the Prague Chamber Orchestra for Supraphon in 2012.
- Concerto in C major for two violas and orchestra. Recorded several times, score released in 1958 by Praha: Český hudenbní fond [Czech music fund], 1958 edited by E. Hradecký.
- Concerto for violin and cello with orchestra. Recorded by Musica Bohemica.
- A sextet for flute, oboe, violin, two violas and cello
- XII variazioni per il violino solo supra la canzonetta Ich bin liederlich du bist liederlich (published in 1798)
- At least six concertante string quartets which may not have an opus number ("concertante" quartets) (played by the Martinů quartet) to add to the above. (Recorded.)
- Mass in E♭ (recorded in 1985)
- Possibly an octet partita for winds (woodwinds and horns) in F major once ascribed to Joseph Haydn.
- Quintet for Oboe, Violin, Viola, Cello and Double Bass in G minor
