= Paul Wranitzky =

Moravian-Austrian classical composer

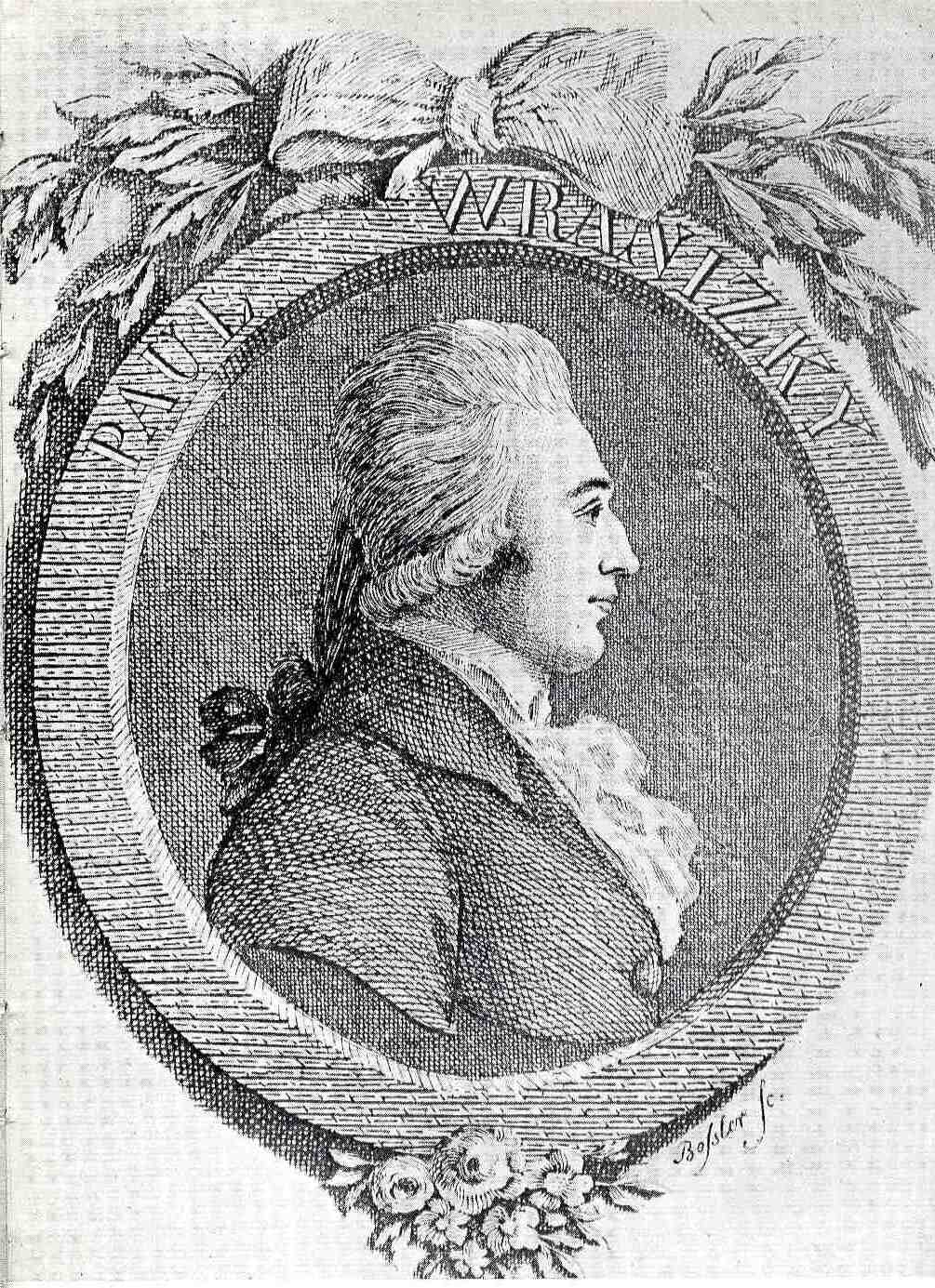
Paul Wranitzky

Paul Wranitzky (Czech: Pavel Vranický; 30 December 1756 – 29 September 1808) was a Moravian classical composer. His half brother, Antonín, was also a composer.

== Life ==
Wranitzky was born in Neureisch (Nová Říše) in Moravia, today Czech Republic. He studied at the Faculty of Theology of University of Olomouc and later a theological seminary in Vienna. At age 20, like so many other Czech composers of that period, he moved to Vienna to seek out opportunities within the Austrian imperial capital.

From 1790, he conducted both royal theater orchestras. He was highly respected by Mozart, Haydn and Beethoven; the latter two preferred him as conductor of their new works (although Beethoven's First Symphony premiere was conducted neither by Beethoven himself, nor by Wranitzky but by Giacomo Conti). Wranitzky was a prolific composer. His output comprises ten operas, 44 symphonies, at least 56 string quartets (some sources give a number as high as 73) and a large amount of other orchestral and chamber music. His opera, Oberon – The Fairy King from 1789 was a favorite in this genre and inspired Emanuel Schikaneder to write the libretto of The Magic Flute for Mozart in 1791; in the mid-1790s, Goethe sought to collaborate with Wranitzky on a sequel to the Mozart opera. Today, Wranitzky is attributed as being one of three possible composers said to have composed the Austrian national anthem (the identity of the actual composer of which is not definitively known).

In 1797, four years after the execution of Louis XVI, Wranitzky wrote Grand Characteristic Symphony for the Peace with the French Republic, which includes the "Funeral March on the Execution of Louis XVI".

Wranitzky died in Vienna on 29 September 1808. Beethoven wrote Variations on a Russian Dance (WoO 71), based on a theme in Wranitzky's ballet Das Waldmädchen (English: The Forest Maiden).

== Views of later scholars ==
Although some scholars believe that he studied with Haydn, there is no proof of this. However, it is certain that he studied Haydn's string quartets and was influenced by them. As with Haydn, Wranitzky's quartet writing went through many stages of development beginning with the pre-classical and evolving to the finished sonata form of late Viennese classicism. The majority of his quartets are in three movements; many share qualities of the Parisian quatuor concertant, with virtuoso writing in all four parts. In these works, he explored the emerging Romantic style with (for the time) daring harmonic progressions, theatrical gestures and virtuoso display.

Based on the ten Wranitzky quartets he has studied, music historian and Anton Reicha scholar Ron Drummond writes, "I can safely and with absolute confidence say that Wranitzky's achievement as a composer of string quartets is a greater achievement, overall, than Mozart's. Lest that statement be misunderstood, let me clarify: it's simply that Wranitzky's output dwarfs Mozart's, and the quality of each man's (mature) productions is so superb that Wranitzky wins by sheer numbers."

Writing about Wranitzky's music in the last part of the 19th century, the Belgian critic and musicologist François-Joseph Fétis recalled, "The music of Wranitzky was in fashion when it was new because of his natural melodies and brilliant style. He treats the orchestra well, especially in symphonies. I recall that, in my youth, his works held up very well in comparison with those of Haydn. Their premature abandonment of today has been for me a source of astonishment."

== Works ==
=== Stage works ===
Symphony Op. 31 The Revolution or La Paix
First part of the introduction

Symphony Op. 31 The Revolution or La Paix
2nd part of movement no. 2, known also as "The Funeral March for the Death of the King Louis XVI" as is in the original score

Symphony Op. 25 La Chasse
Movement no. 4; first 57 seconds (All three performances: Porticodoro / SmartCGArt Media Productions – Classical Orchestra)

"Bundeshymne der Republik Österreich"
The Austrian national anthem, which Wranitzky is said to have possibly composed.

Operas

- Die gute Mutter (Johann Baptist von Alxinger, Vienna, 1795)
- Das Maroccanische Reich oder Die unterirdischen Schätze (1795)
- Die Dienstpflicht (s.a.)

Operettas

- Das Fest der Lazaronen (Joachim Perinet, Vienna, 1794)

Singspiele

- Oberon, König der Elfen (libretto by Friederike S. Seyler, extensively revised by Karl Ludwig Giesecke. Vienna, 1789)
- Der dreifache Liebhaber (Vienna, 1791)
- Rudolph von Felseck (J. Korompay, Vienna, 1792)
- Merkur, der Heiratstifter, oder Der Geiz im Geldkasten (Vienna, 1793)
- Die Post-Station oder Die unerwartete Zusammenkunft (S.F. Künster, 1793)
- Der Schreiner (August von Kotzebue, Vienna, 1799)
- Die drei Buckligen (Warsaw, 1808)

Other types of opera works

- quadro musicale romantico: Johanna von Montfaucon (August von Kotzebue, Vienna, 1799)
- Liedspiel: Das Mitgefühl (Friedrich Treitschke, Vienna, 1804)
- divertissement: Das Picknick der Götter (Schönbrunn, 1804); Die Erkenntlichkeit (Vienna, 1804)
- travestimenti-melologhi: Medea; Macbeth

Ballets

- Die Weinlese (Vienna, 1794)
- Zephir und Flora (Vienna, 1795)
- Das Waldmädchen (Vienna, 1796)
- Die Luftfahrer (Vienna, 1797)
- Cyrus and Tomyris (1797)
- Die Waise der Berghöhle (Vienna, 1810)
- Walmir und Gertraud (ca. 1800)
- Das Urteil des Paris (Vienna, 1801)
- Der Raub der Sabinerinnen (Vienna, 1804)
- Zufriedenheit mehr als Reichtum (Vienna, 1805)
- Zelina und Gorano (Vienna, 1806)

Theatre music

- Rollas Tod (August von Kotzebue, Vienna, 1795)
- Achmet und Zenide (August Wilhelm Iffland)
- Jolantha
- Die Rache
- Siri-Brahe

=== Other works ===
- 1 cantata
- 56 symphonies: 29 published symphonies, 27 symphonies in manuscripts
- 3 piano sonatas
- 1 Missa

Concertos

- Violin Concerto in C
- Violin Concerto in D
- Violin Concerto in F
- Violin Concerto in G
- Cello Concerto in C, Op. 27
- Flute Concerto in D, Op. 24/Op. 1
- Oboe Concerto in G
- Concertante for Flute and Oboe in C, Op. 39
- Concertino for Oboe and Cello in D (lost)
- Concerto for Two Flutes in G (lost)

Other orchestra works

- Overture, Divertimenti, Tafelmusik, dances

Chamber Music

- String Trio in G Major, Op. 3 No. 3 (recorded by The Vivaldi Project on MSR Classics 1623)
- Quartets, quintets, etc.
