= Georg Friedrich Treitschke =

German librettist, translator and lepidopterist (1776–1842)

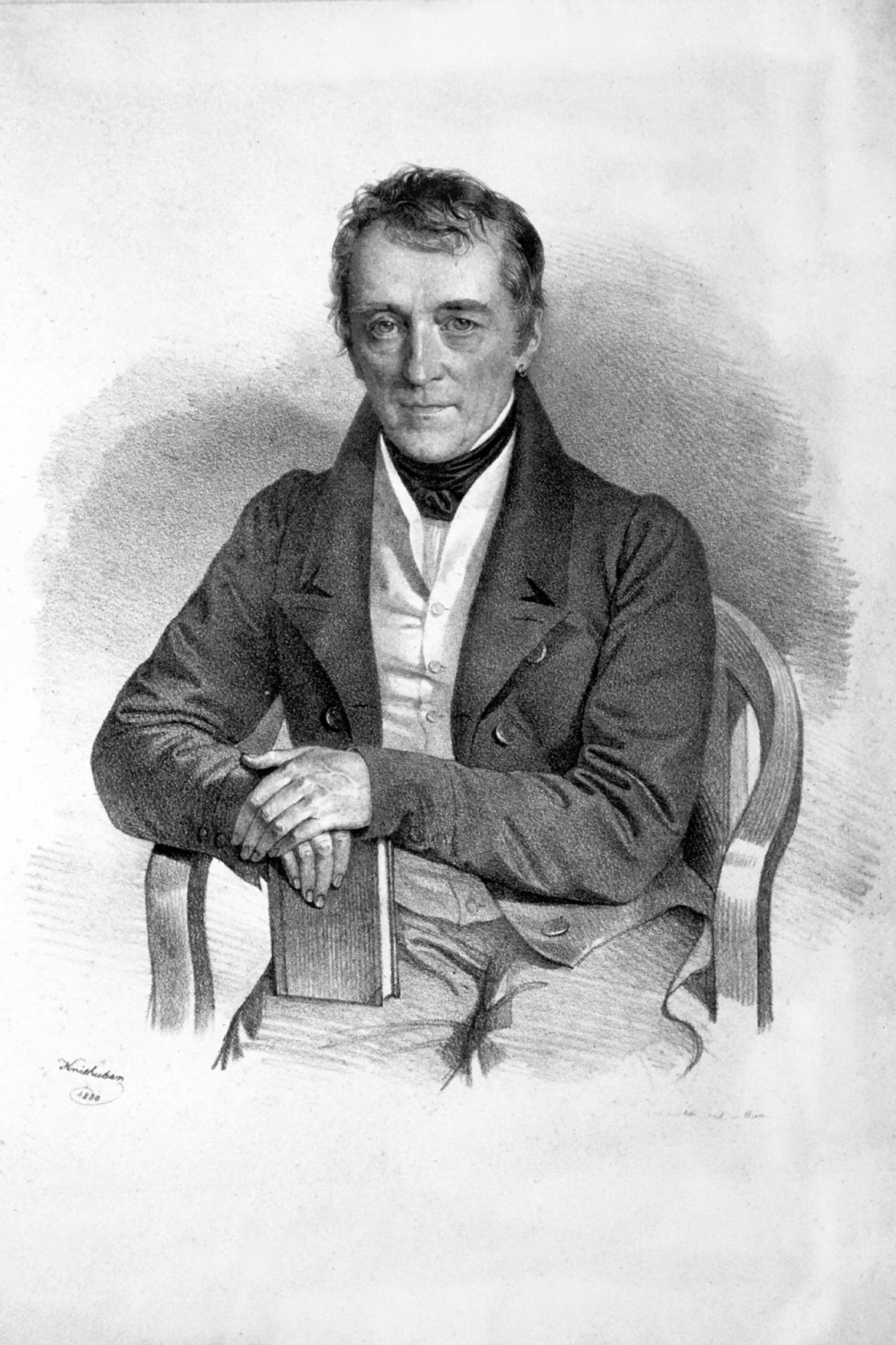
- 1830 lithograph of Treitschke
- Born: 29 August 1776; Leipzig, Germany
- Died: 4 June 1842 (aged 65); Vienna, Austria
- Occupations: Librettist, translator, lepidopterist

Georg Friedrich Treitschke (German: [ˈtʀaɪtʃkə]; 29 August 1776 – 4 June 1842) was a German librettist, translator and lepidopterist.

In 1800, he came to the Vienna Hofoper. From 1809 to 1814, he was principal of the Viennese Theater an der Wien. He wrote mostly librettos for Paul Wranitzky, Adalbert Gyrowetz and C. Weigl (Weisenhaus, The Orphanage), and translated many French operas into German. In 1814, he revised the libretto of Fidelio at Ludwig van Beethoven's request.

== Entomological works ==
- with Ochsenheimer, F. (1825): Die Schmetterlinge von Europa, Band 5/1. – Leipzig (Fleischer). XVI + 414 S.
- Treitschke, F. (1825): Die Schmetterlinge von Europa, Band 5/2. – Leipzig (Fleischer). 447 + [1] S.
- Treitschke, F. (1826): Die Schmetterlinge von Europa, Band 5/3. – Leipzig (Fleischer). IV + 419 + [1] S.
- Treitschke, F. (1827): Die Schmetterlinge von Europa, Band 6/1. – Leipzig (Fleischer). VIII + 444 S.
- Treitschke, F. (1828): Die Schmetterlinge von Europa, Band 6/2. – Leipzig (Fleischer). 319 S.
- Treitschke, F. (1829): Die Schmetterlinge von Europa, Band 7. – Leipzig (Fleischer). VI + 252 S.
- Treitschke, F. (1830): Die Schmetterlinge von Europa, Band 8. – Leipzig (Fleischer). VIII + 312 S.
- Treitschke, F. (1832): Die Schmetterlinge von Europa, Band 9/1. – Leipzig (Fleischer). VIII + 272 S.
- Treitschke, F. (1833): Die Schmetterlinge von Europa, Band 9/2. – Leipzig (Fleischer). 284 S.
- Treitschke, F. (1834): Die Schmetterlinge von Europa, Band 10/1. – Leipzig (Fleischer). X + 286 S.
- Treitschke, F. (1835): Die Schmetterlinge von Europa, Band 10/2. – Leipzig (Fleischer). [2] + 340 S.
- Treitschke, F. (1835): Die Schmetterlinge von Europa, Band 10/3. – Leipzig (Fleischer). [4] + 302 S.
- Treitschke, F. (Hrsg.) (1840-1843): Naturhistorischer Bildersaal des Thierreiches. Nach William Jardine. Vorwort von K. Vogel. 4 Bände. – Pesth und Leipzig (Hartleben). Ca. 770 S., 180 Taf. (360 Abb.).
- Treitschke, F. (1841): Naturgeschichte der europäischen Schmetterlinge. Schwärmer und Spinner. – Pesth (Hartleben). [9] + XIV + [2] + 222 S., Frontispiz, 30 Taf.
