= Udea carniolica =

Scientific classification
- Kingdom: Animalia
- Phylum: Arthropoda
- Clade: Pancrustacea
- Class: Insecta
- Order: Lepidoptera
- Family: Crambidae
- Genus: Udea
- Species: U. carniolica

Binomial name
- Udea carniolica Huemer & Tarmann, 1989

Species of moth

Udea carniolica is a species of moth in the family Crambidae. It is found in Italy, Austria and Slovenia.
