= Coleophora derasofasciella =

Scientific classification
- Kingdom: Animalia
- Phylum: Arthropoda
- Clade: Pancrustacea
- Class: Insecta
- Order: Lepidoptera
- Family: Coleophoridae
- Genus: Coleophora
- Species: C. derasofasciella

Binomial name
- Coleophora derasofasciella Klimesch, 1952

Synonyms
- Coleophora paeltsaella Palmqvist & Hellberg, 1999

Species of moth

Coleophora derasofasciella is a moth of the family Coleophoridae. It is found in the Alps in Austria, Germany, Italy and Slovenia and also in alpine regions in northern Russia and at one spot in northern Sweden (previously described as Coleophora paeltsaella, Palmqvist & Hellberg, 1999).
