= Coleophora riffelensis =

Scientific classification
- Kingdom: Animalia
- Phylum: Arthropoda
- Class: Insecta
- Order: Lepidoptera
- Family: Coleophoridae
- Genus: Coleophora
- Species: C. riffelensis

Binomial name
- Coleophora riffelensis Rebel, 1913

Synonyms
- Coleophora eudoriella Toll, 1952; Coleophora fischeri Toll, 1950; Coleophora klemensiewiczi Toll, 1950

Species of moth

Coleophora riffelensis is a moth of the family Coleophoridae. It has a fragmented distribution between the Baltic states and central Russia in the north and the Iberian Peninsula and North Macedonia in the south.

The larvae feed on Dianthus lumnitzeri serotinus. Full-grown cases can be found in late June.
