= Coleophora paramayrella =

Scientific classification
- Kingdom: Animalia
- Phylum: Arthropoda
- Class: Insecta
- Order: Lepidoptera
- Family: Coleophoridae
- Genus: Coleophora
- Species: C. paramayrella

Binomial name
- Coleophora paramayrella Nel, 1993

Species of moth

Coleophora paramayrella is a moth of the family Coleophoridae. It is found in southern Europe.

The length of the forewings is 6.5-7.5 mm for males and 6-6.5 mm for females. Adults are on wing from May to June.

The larvae feed on Trifolium ochroleucon.
