= Coleophora squamella =

Scientific classification
- Kingdom: Animalia
- Phylum: Arthropoda
- Class: Insecta
- Order: Lepidoptera
- Family: Coleophoridae
- Genus: Coleophora
- Species: C. squamella

Binomial name
- Coleophora squamella Constant, 1885

Synonyms
- Coleophora paragenistae Kasy, 1964

Species of moth

Coleophora squamella is a moth of the family Coleophoridae. It is found from the Czech Republic to Sardinia and Italy and from France to Romania. It is also known from Turkey.

Adults are on wing in autumn and late spring.

The larvae feed on Dorycnium pentaphyllum, Dorycnium pentaphyllum germanicum, Lotus corniculatus, Lotus cytisoides, Lotus tenuis and Lotus uliginosus. Larvae can be found from early summer to spring.
