= Scrobipalpa perinii =

Scientific classification
- Kingdom: Animalia
- Phylum: Arthropoda
- Clade: Pancrustacea
- Class: Insecta
- Order: Lepidoptera
- Family: Gelechiidae
- Genus: Scrobipalpa
- Species: S. perinii

Binomial name
- Scrobipalpa perinii (Klimesch, 1951)

Synonyms
- Phthorimaea perinii Klimesch, 1951

Species of moth

Scrobipalpa perinii is a moth in the family Gelechiidae. It was described by Klimesch in 1951. It is found in southern France, northern Italy, Slovenia, North Macedonia and Greece.
