= Scrobipalpa kasyi =

Scientific classification
- Kingdom: Animalia
- Phylum: Arthropoda
- Clade: Pancrustacea
- Class: Insecta
- Order: Lepidoptera
- Family: Gelechiidae
- Genus: Scrobipalpa
- Species: S. kasyi

Binomial name
- Scrobipalpa kasyi Povolný, 1966

Species of moth

Scrobipalpa kasyi is a moth in the family Gelechiidae. It was described by Dalibor Povolný in 1966. It is found in North Macedonia (type locality: "Treskaschlucht" =Matka dam near Skopje), Slovenia, Bulgaria, and Greece.

The length of the forewings is 4–5.8 mm (0.16–0.23 in). The larvae feed on Alyssum montanum.
