= Chionodes perpetuella =

Scientific classification
- Kingdom: Animalia
- Phylum: Arthropoda
- Clade: Pancrustacea
- Class: Insecta
- Order: Lepidoptera
- Family: Gelechiidae
- Genus: Chionodes
- Species: C. perpetuella

Binomial name
- Chionodes perpetuella (Herrich-Schäffer, 1854)

Synonyms
- Gelechia perpetuella Herrich-Schäffer, 1854

Species of moth

Chionodes perpetuella is a moth of the family Gelechiidae. It is found in France, Germany, Austria, Switzerland, Italy and Slovenia.
