= Coleophora medelichensis =

Scientific classification
- Kingdom: Animalia
- Phylum: Arthropoda
- Class: Insecta
- Order: Lepidoptera
- Family: Coleophoridae
- Genus: Coleophora
- Species: C. medelichensis

Binomial name
- Coleophora medelichensis Krone, 1908

Species of moth

Coleophora medelichensis is a moth of the family Coleophoridae. It is found from the Czech Republic to the Iberian Peninsula, Italy and Crete and from France to Romania.

Larvae can be found from August to June in two overlapping generations.
