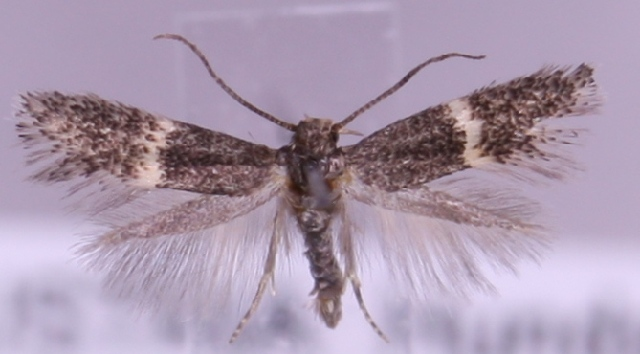

Scientific classification
- Kingdom: Animalia
- Phylum: Arthropoda
- Class: Insecta
- Order: Lepidoptera
- Family: Elachistidae
- Genus: Elachista
- Species: E. metella

Binomial name
- Elachista metella Kaila, 2002

= Elachista metella =

Species of moth

Elachista metella is a moth of the family Elachistidae that is found in France, Switzerland, Austria, the Czech Republic, Slovakia, Hungary, Slovenia, Croatia and Bulgaria.
