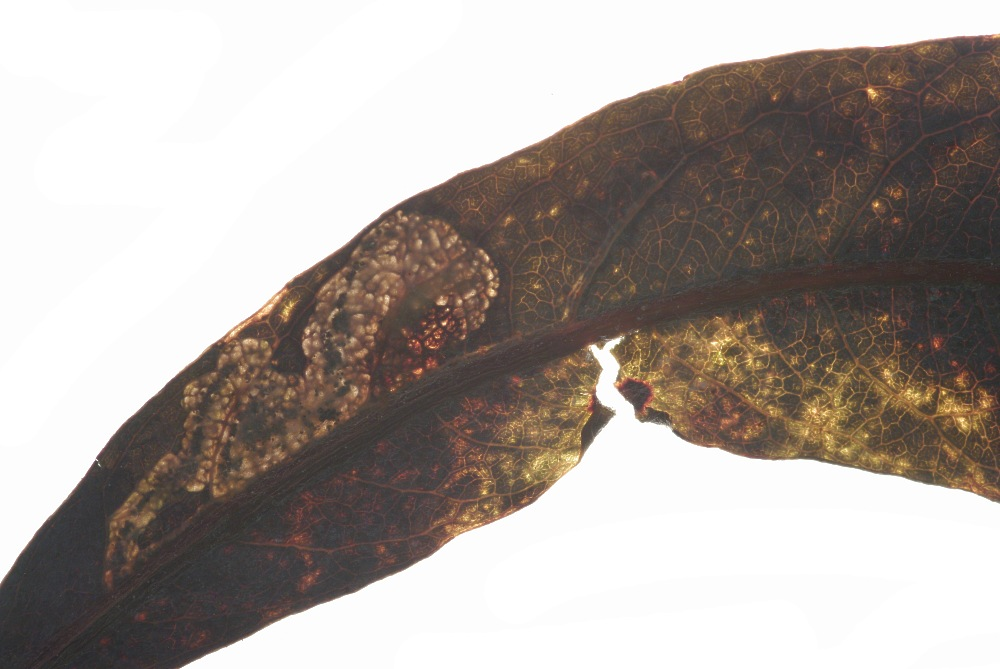

Scientific classification
- Kingdom: Animalia
- Phylum: Arthropoda
- Clade: Pancrustacea
- Class: Insecta
- Order: Lepidoptera
- Family: Nepticulidae
- Genus: Stigmella
- Species: S. pallidiciliella

Binomial name
- Stigmella pallidiciliella Klimesch, 1946

= Stigmella pallidiciliella =

Species of moth

Stigmella pallidiciliella is a moth of the family Nepticulidae. It is found from the Czech Republic and Slovakia to northern Italy.

The larvae feed on Salix purpurea. They mine the leaves of their host plant.
