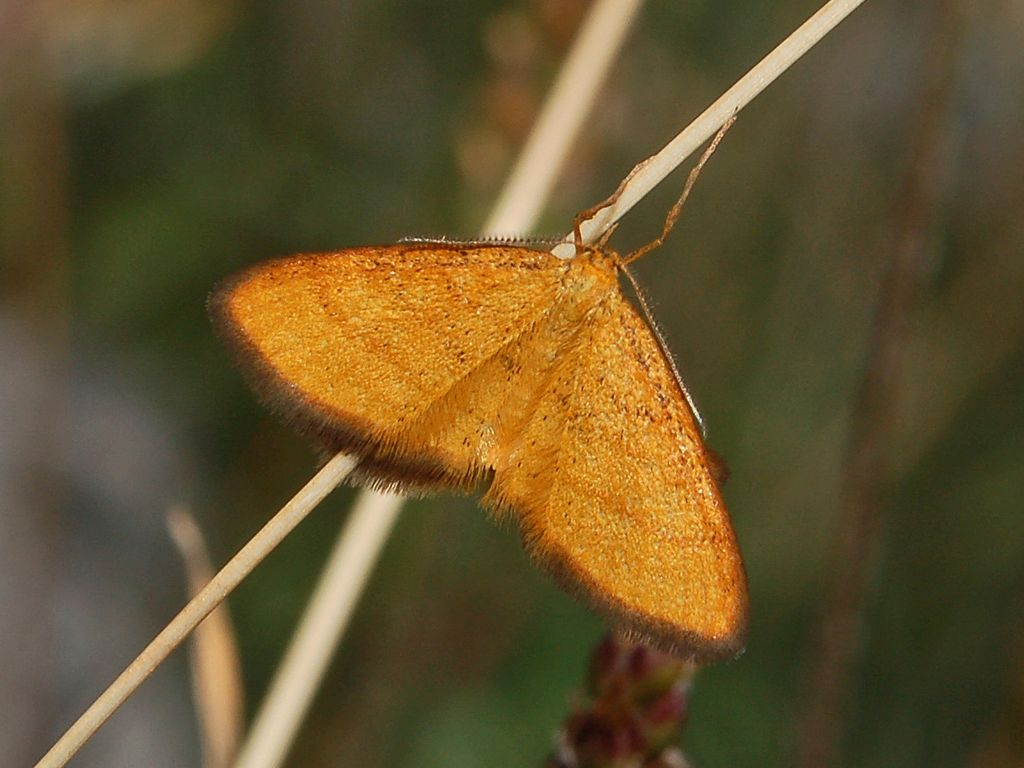
- Upperside
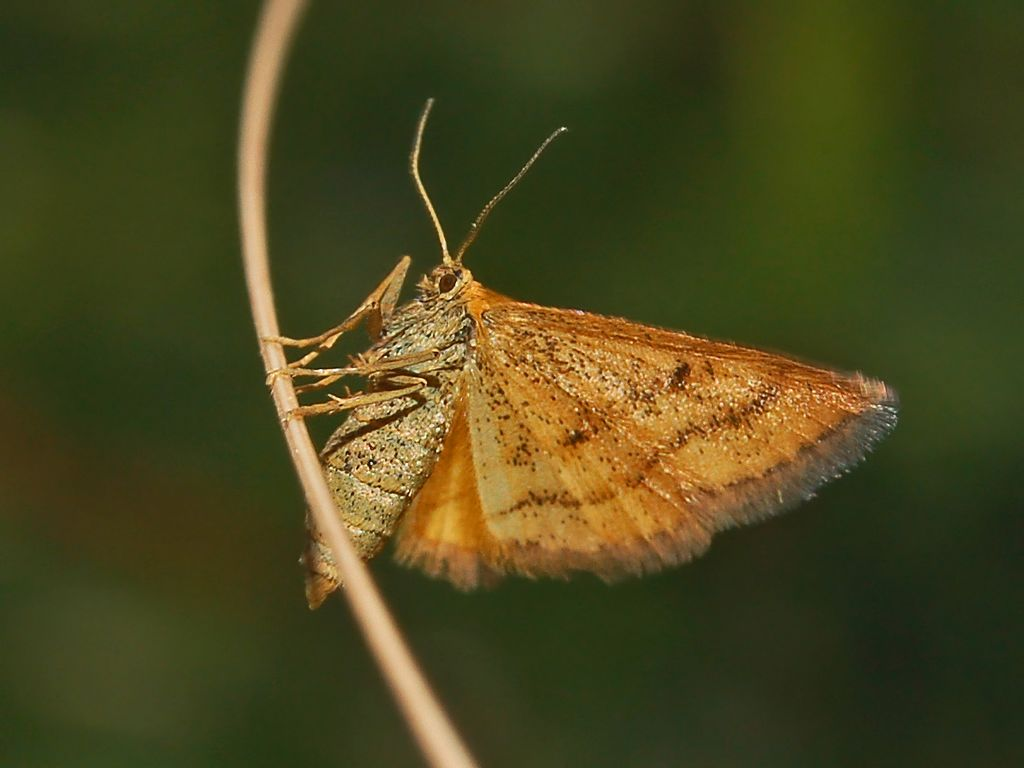
- Underside

Scientific classification
- Kingdom: Animalia
- Phylum: Arthropoda
- Clade: Pancrustacea
- Class: Insecta
- Order: Lepidoptera
- Family: Geometridae
- Genus: Idaea
- Species: I. flaveolaria

Binomial name
- Idaea flaveolaria (Hübner, 1809)

Synonyms
- Geometra flaveolaria Hübner, 1809; Geometra brunnearia Fabricius, 1794

= Idaea flaveolaria =

Species of moth

Idaea flaveolaria is a moth of the family Geometridae first described by Jacob Hübner in 1809.

== Distribution ==
This species can be found in Spain, the French Alps, Italy, Switzerland, Austria and eastern Russia.

== Description ==
Idaea flaveolaria has a wingspan of 12–14 millimetres (0.47–0.55 in) in females and 14–18 millimetres (0.55–0.71 in) in males. The basic color of the wings is bright brown orange. On the forewings and hindwings there are two brown transverse lines, often almost indistinct. These transversal lines appear more clearly on the underside of the wings, together with dark discal spots. The edge of the wings shows a blackish fringe.

== Biology ==
Adults are on wing in July and August. The larvae feed on withered leaves of herbaceous low-growing plants.
