= Stigmella johanssonella =

Scientific classification
- Kingdom: Animalia
- Phylum: Arthropoda
- Clade: Pancrustacea
- Class: Insecta
- Order: Lepidoptera
- Family: Nepticulidae
- Genus: Stigmella
- Species: S. johanssonella

Binomial name
- Stigmella johanssonella A. & Z. Laštuvka, 1997

Species of moth

Stigmella johanssonella is a moth of the family Nepticulidae. It is found from Austria and Bulgaria to Italy and Greece.
