= Coleophora cythisanthi =

Scientific classification
- Kingdom: Animalia
- Phylum: Arthropoda
- Clade: Pancrustacea
- Class: Insecta
- Order: Lepidoptera
- Family: Coleophoridae
- Genus: Coleophora
- Species: C. cythisanthi

Binomial name
- Coleophora cythisanthi Baldizzone, 1978

Species of moth

Coleophora cythisanthi is a moth of the family Coleophoridae. It is found in Italy and Slovenia.

The larvae feed on Cytisanthus radiatus. They feed on the lateral shoots of their host plant.
