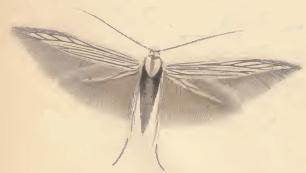

Scientific classification
- Kingdom: Animalia
- Phylum: Arthropoda
- Class: Insecta
- Order: Lepidoptera
- Family: Coleophoridae
- Genus: Coleophora
- Species: C. serratulella

Binomial name
- Coleophora serratulella Herrich-Schaffer, 1855

= Coleophora serratulella =

Species of moth

Coleophora serratulella is a moth of the family Coleophoridae. It is found from Germany to the Pyrenees and Alps and from France to Romania and Greece.

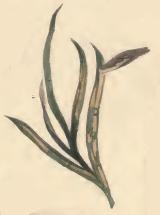
Mined leaf of Serratula cyanoides with larva-case attached

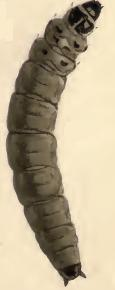
Larva

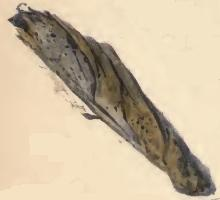
Larval case
