= Coleophora preisseckeri =

Scientific classification
- Kingdom: Animalia
- Phylum: Arthropoda
- Class: Insecta
- Order: Lepidoptera
- Family: Coleophoridae
- Genus: Coleophora
- Species: C. preisseckeri

Binomial name
- Coleophora preisseckeri Toll, 1942

Species of moth

Coleophora preisseckeri is a moth of the family Coleophoridae. It is found from Spain, France, Italy, Austria, Slovenia, Croatia, Hungary, Slovakia, Romania, Ukraine, southern Russia, North Macedonia and Turkey.
