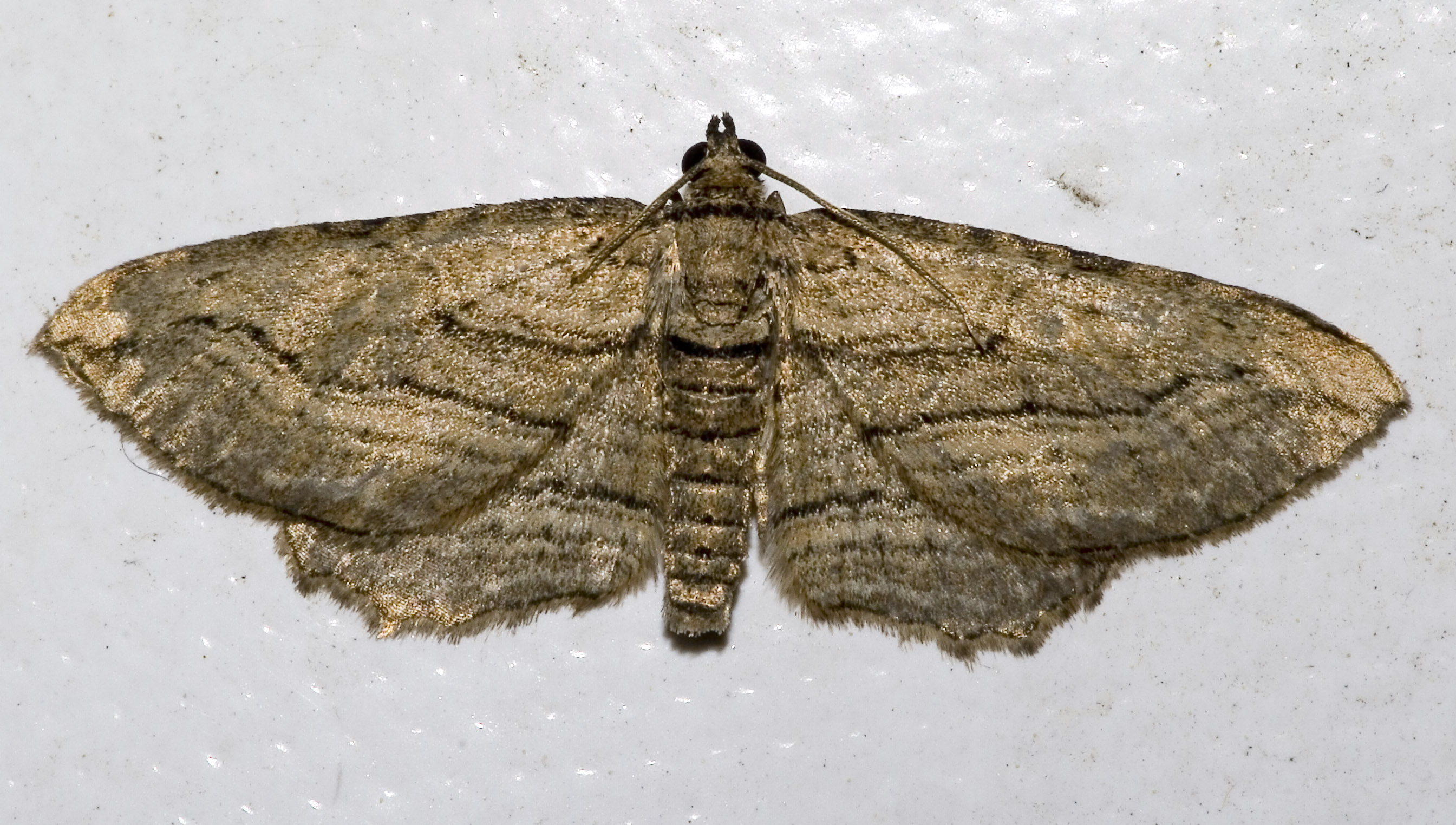
- Horisme corticata

Scientific classification
- Domain: Eukaryota
- Kingdom: Animalia
- Phylum: Arthropoda
- Class: Insecta
- Order: Lepidoptera
- Family: Geometridae
- Subfamily: Larentiinae
- Tribe: Melanthiini; Duponchel, 1845

Synonyms
- Melanthiinae

= Melanthiini =

Tribe of moths

Melanthiini is a tribe of geometer moths under subfamily Larentiinae. The tribe was described by Philogène Auguste Joseph Duponchel in 1845.

== Recognized genera ==
- Anticollix Prout, 1938
- Bundelia Viidalepp, 1988
- Coenocalpe Hübner, 1825
- Collix Guenée in Boisduval & Guenée, 1857
- Echthrocollix Inoue, 1953
- Herbulotia Inoue, 1953
- Horisme Hübner, [1825]
- Kauria Viidalepp, 1988
- Melanthia Duponchel, 1829
- Pseudocollix Warren, 1895
- Zola Warren, 1894
