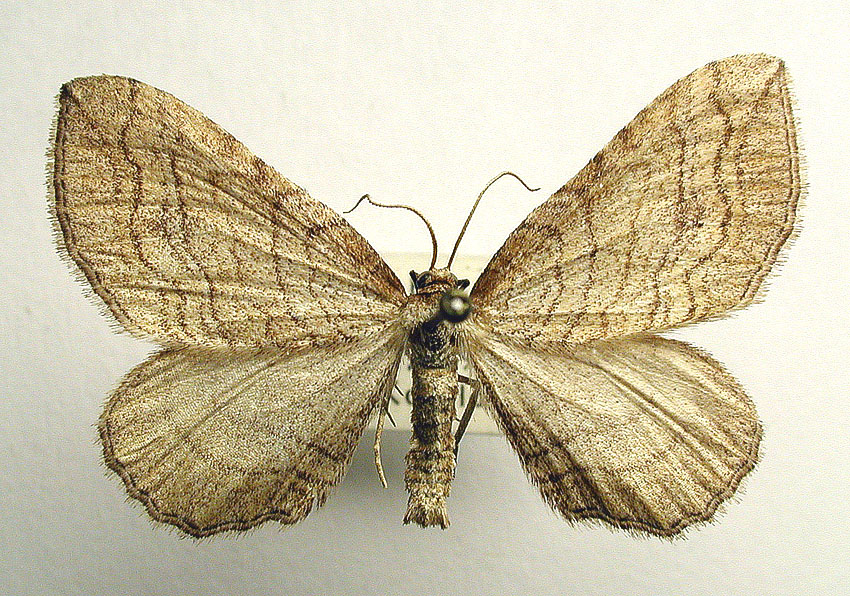

Scientific classification
- Kingdom: Animalia
- Phylum: Arthropoda
- Clade: Pancrustacea
- Class: Insecta
- Order: Lepidoptera
- Family: Geometridae
- Genus: Coenocalpe
- Species: C. lapidata

Binomial name
- Coenocalpe lapidata (Hübner, 1809)

Synonyms
- Geometra lapidata Hubner, 1809

= Coenocalpe lapidata =

Species of moth

Coenocalpe lapidata, the slender-striped rufous, is a moth of the family Geometridae. It was described by Jacob Hübner in 1809 and is found in most of the Palearctic realm.

The wingspan is 28–34 mm. It cannot possibly be confused with any other species. The forewings are light brown with fine dark brown diagonal lines. These lines are less conspicuous on the hindwings. Discal dots are minute or wanting, apex of forewing with an oblique shade the name typical form is pale. — millierata Stgr, from S. E. France, is more liver-coloured, more obscurely marked, the hindwing more darkened distally. The larva is nearly cylindrical, dorsally with longitudinal lines and stripes of ochreous and brown or fuscous, ventrally more reddish, lateral stripe pale. The tubercles and spiracles are black. The pupa is cylindrical, rather blunt at ends, its surface polished reddish brown.

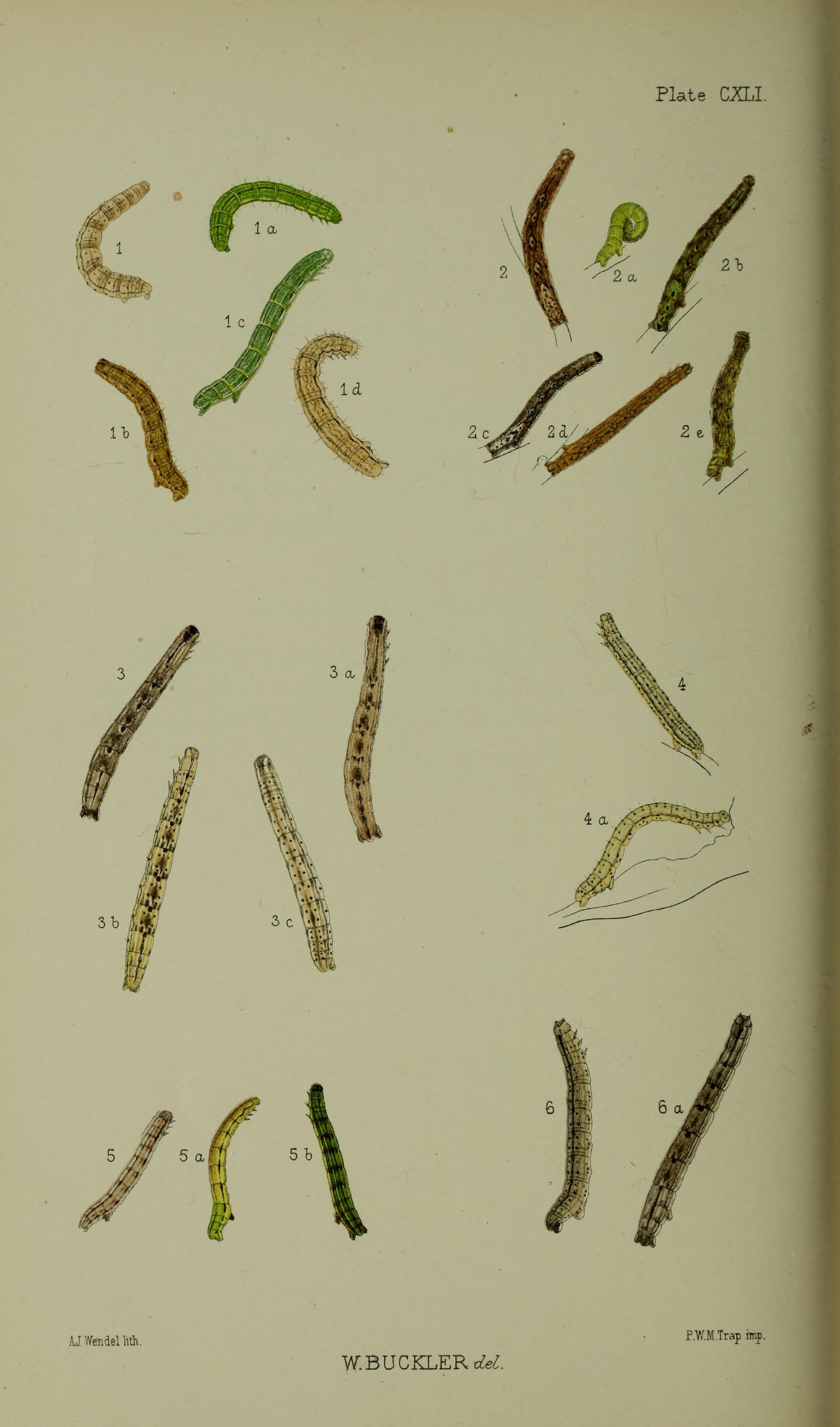
4, 4a, larvae after final moult

Adults are on wing from May to September in two generations.

The larvae feed on Ranunculus acris, Anemone nemorosa, Galium and Clematis vitalba.
