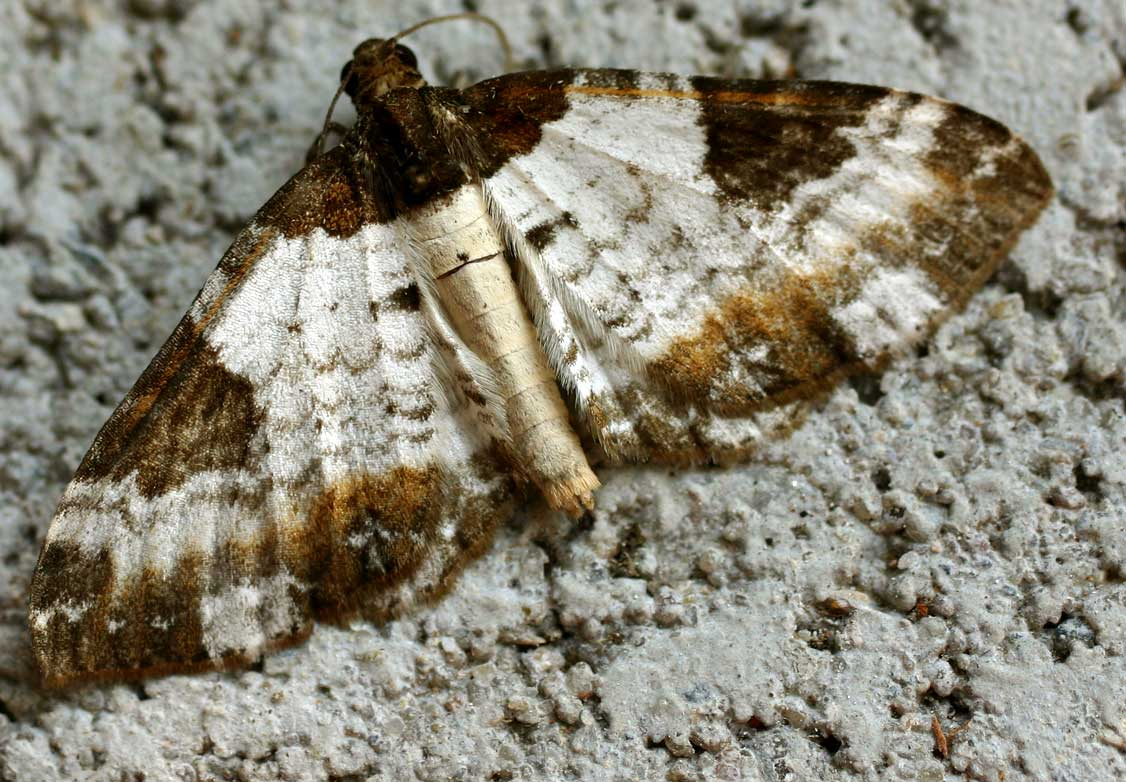

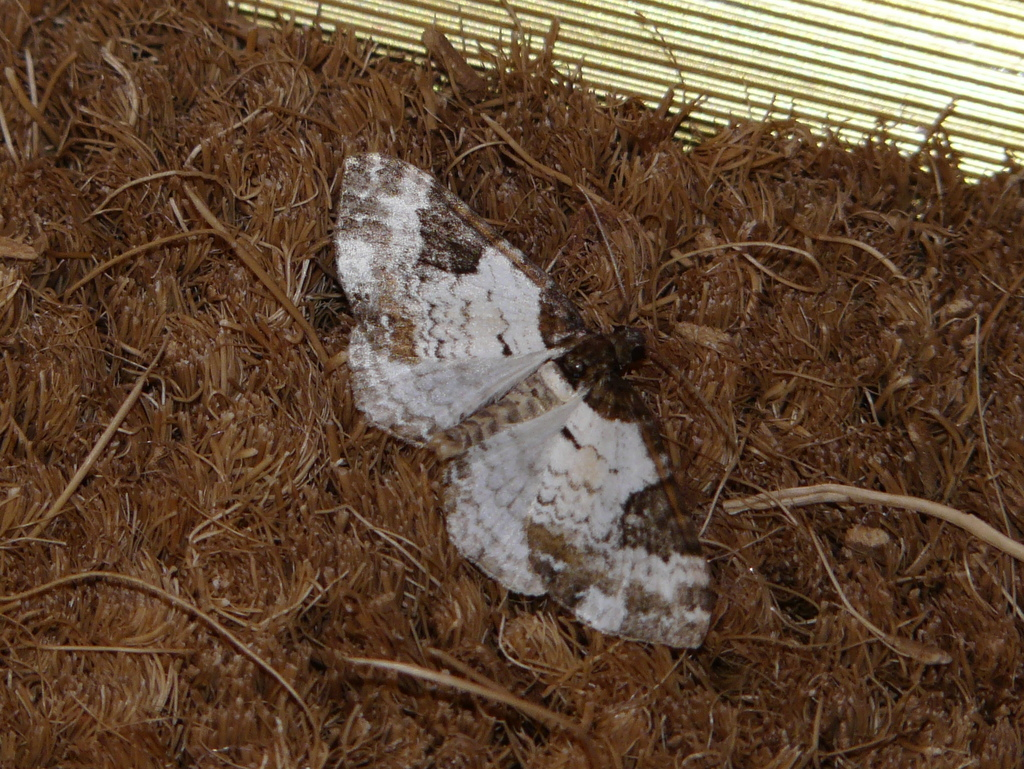

Scientific classification
- Domain: Eukaryota
- Kingdom: Animalia
- Phylum: Arthropoda
- Class: Insecta
- Order: Lepidoptera
- Family: Geometridae
- Genus: Melanthia
- Species: M. procellata

Binomial name
- Melanthia procellata (Denis & Schiffermüller, 1775)

= Melanthia procellata =

Species of moth

Melanthia procellata, the pretty chalk carpet, is a species of moth of the family Geometridae. It is found throughout Europe.

The wingspan is 27–32 mm. The moth flies from May to August.

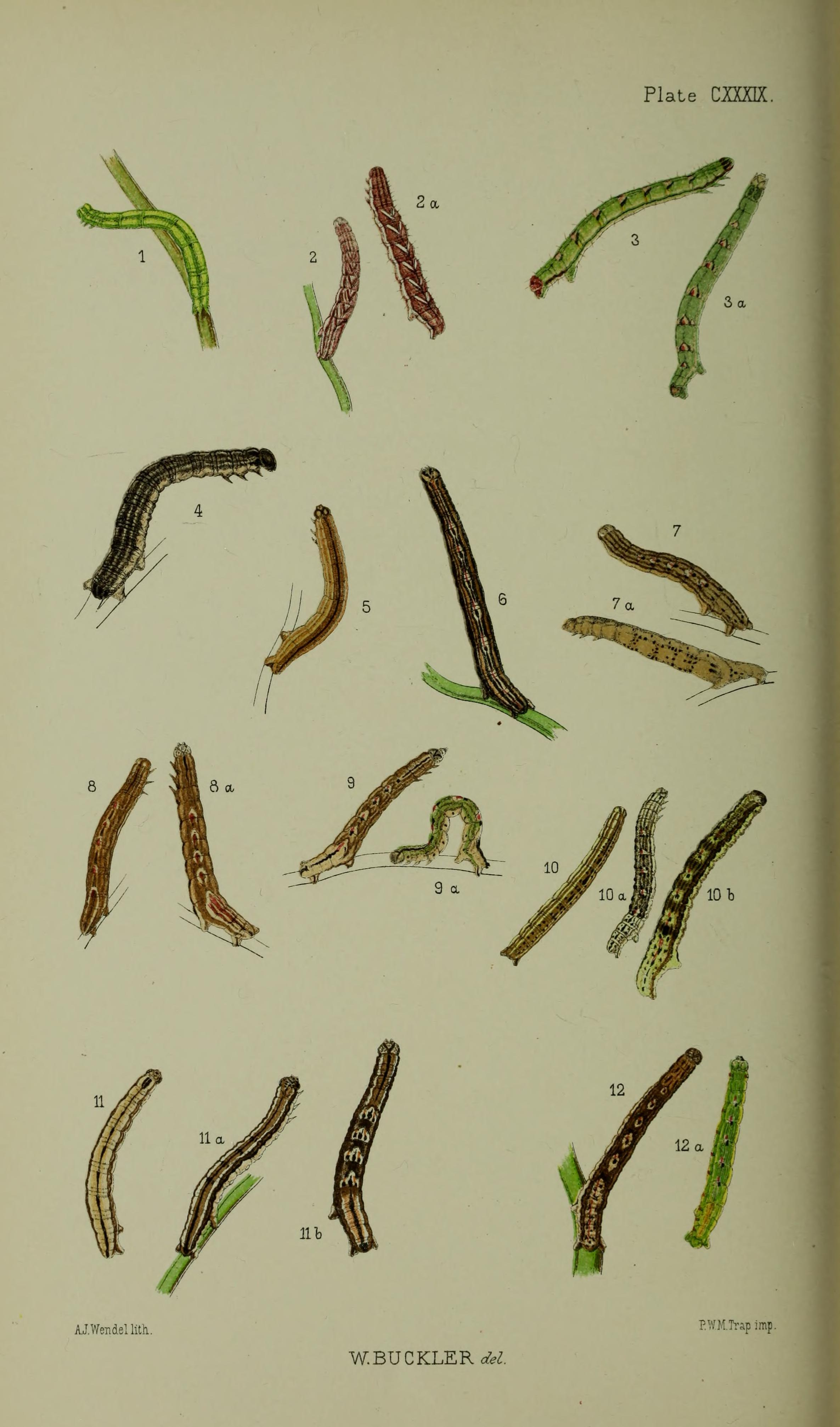
Fig.6 larvae after final moult

The caterpillars feed on Clematis vitalba.

== Notes ==
1. The flight season refers to Belgium and The Netherlands. This may vary in other parts of the range.
