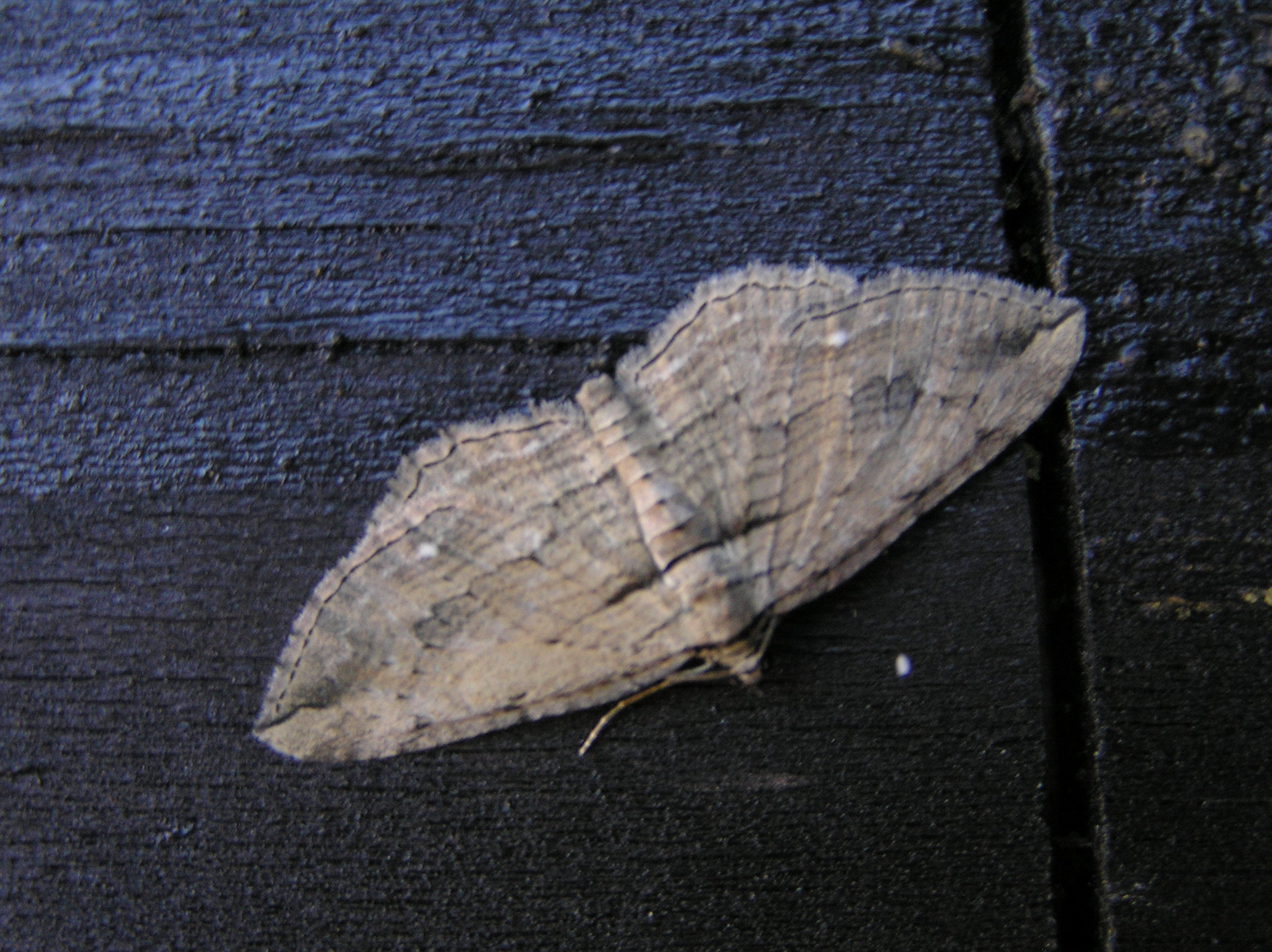

Scientific classification
- Kingdom: Animalia
- Phylum: Arthropoda
- Clade: Pancrustacea
- Class: Insecta
- Order: Lepidoptera
- Family: Geometridae
- Genus: Horisme
- Species: H. tersata

Binomial name
- Horisme tersata (Denis & Schiffermüller, 1775)

= Horisme tersata =

Fern

Species of moth

Horisme tersata, commonly known as the fern moth or simply the fern, is a moth of the family Geometridae. The species was first described by Michael Denis and Ignaz Schiffermüller in 1775 and it can be found in the Palearctic realm.

The wingspan is 31–36 mm. The length of the forewings is 14–18 mm. The moths fly in one or two generations from May to August.

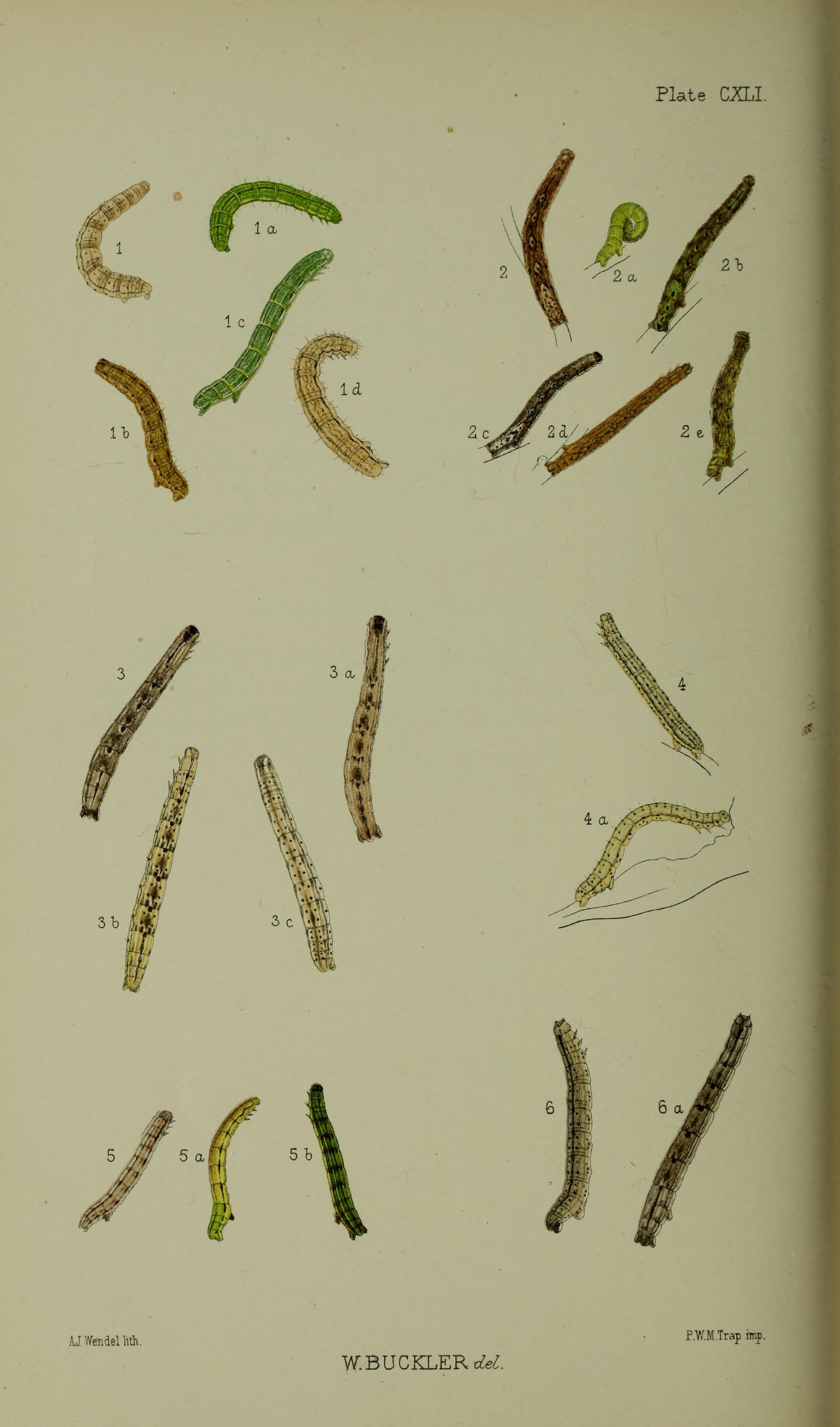
3, 3a, 3b, 3c larvae after final moult

The larvae feed on Clematis vitalba.

== Notes ==
1. The flight season refers to Belgium and the Netherlands. This may vary in other parts of the range.
