= Collix purpurilita =

Scientific classification
- Kingdom: Animalia
- Phylum: Arthropoda
- Clade: Pancrustacea
- Class: Insecta
- Order: Lepidoptera
- Family: Geometridae
- Genus: Collix
- Species: C. purpurilita

Binomial name
- Collix purpurilita Prout, 1925

Species of moth

Collix purpurilita is a moth in the family Geometridae. It is found on the Solomon Islands.
