= Collix astathes =

Scientific classification
- Domain: Eukaryota
- Kingdom: Animalia
- Phylum: Arthropoda
- Class: Insecta
- Order: Lepidoptera
- Family: Geometridae
- Genus: Collix
- Species: C. astathes

Binomial name
- Collix astathes Prout, 1937

Species of moth

Collix astathes is a moth in the family Geometridae. It was described by Prout in 1937. It is found on Bali.
