= Collix suffusca =

Scientific classification
- Domain: Eukaryota
- Kingdom: Animalia
- Phylum: Arthropoda
- Class: Insecta
- Order: Lepidoptera
- Family: Geometridae
- Genus: Collix
- Species: C. suffusca

Binomial name
- Collix suffusca Warren, 1907

Species of moth

Collix suffusca is a moth in the family Geometridae. It is found in New Guinea.
