= Collix hypospilata =

Scientific classification
- Domain: Eukaryota
- Kingdom: Animalia
- Phylum: Arthropoda
- Class: Insecta
- Order: Lepidoptera
- Family: Geometridae
- Genus: Collix
- Species: C. hypospilata

Binomial name
- Collix hypospilata Guenée, 1857

Synonyms
- Phibalapteryx hypospilata Guenée, 1857

Species of moth

Collix hypospilata is a moth in the family Geometridae. It was described by Achille Guenée in 1857. It is endemic to Sri Lanka.

== Description ==
Its wingspan is about 40 millimetres (1.6 in). Palpi with the second joint reaching far beyond the frontal tuft. Mid tibia of male very much dilated and with a deep groove. Abdomen long, with a large anal tuft. The male is dark fuscous with a slight purplish tinge. Wings with numerous indistinct waved black lines. Forewings with a prominent discocellulars boss of raised scales. The veins speckled with pale brown between waved lines. Hindwings with small discocellular spots. Both wings with submarginal series of pale brown specks and a black marginal line interrupted by pale specks at the vein. Ventral side fuscous brown. Both wings with very prominent black cell-spot, less prominent curved postmedial band. There is a prominent submarginal black spot series. A spot found between vein 3 and 4 absent.

Female often with brownish ground color or with brown patches in the cell of forewings and forming an obscure postmedial band to both wings.
