= Collix stenoplia =

Scientific classification
- Kingdom: Animalia
- Phylum: Arthropoda
- Clade: Pancrustacea
- Class: Insecta
- Order: Lepidoptera
- Family: Geometridae
- Genus: Collix
- Species: C. stenoplia

Binomial name
- Collix stenoplia Prout, 1929

Species of moth

Collix stenoplia is a moth in the family Geometridae. It is found on Peninsular Malaysia and Borneo. Its habitat consists of montane areas. It has medium-brown wings with one row of pale dots along the distal edge.
