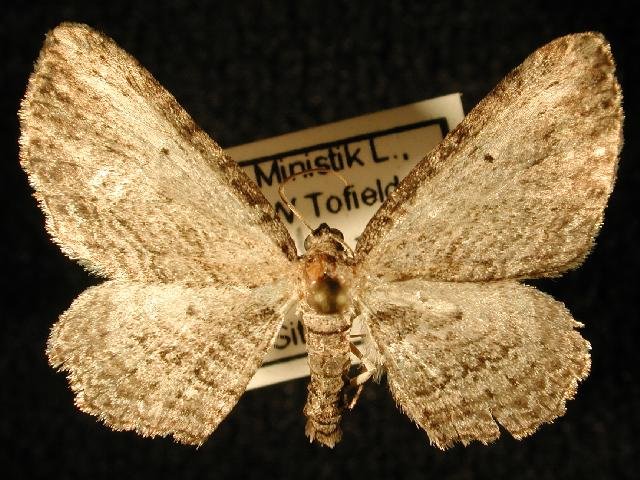

Scientific classification
- Domain: Eukaryota
- Kingdom: Animalia
- Phylum: Arthropoda
- Class: Insecta
- Order: Lepidoptera
- Family: Geometridae
- Tribe: Eupitheciini
- Genus: Horisme; Hübner, [1825]

Synonyms
- Pseudocollix Warren, 1895; Horisma Hulst, 1896; Larentia Bruand, 1847

= Horisme =

Genus of moths

Horisme is a genus of moths in the family Geometridae. The genus was described by Jacob Hübner in 1825.

== Species ==
- Horisme aemulata (Hübner, 1813)
- Horisme albifascia Herbulot, 1997
- Horisme albiplaga Herbulot, 1988
- Horisme albostriata (Pagenstecher, 1907)
- Horisme alticameruna Herbulot, 1988
- Horisme aquata (Hübner, 1813)
- Horisme calligraphata (Herrich-Schäffer, 1839)
- Horisme corticata (Treitschke, 1835)
- Horisme cuprea Herbulot, 1972
- Horisme disparata Herbulot, 1988
- Horisme exoletata (Herrich-Schäffer, 1838)
- Horisme falcata (Bang-Haas, 1907)
- Horisme filia L. B. Prout, 1913
- Horisme gillettei (Hulst, 1898)
- Horisme incana Swett, 1918
- Horisme incurvaria (Erschoff, 1877)
- Horisme intersecta (Staudinger, 1882)
- Horisme intestinata (Guenée, 1857)
- Horisme intricata (Staudinger, 1882)
- Horisme inturbida Herbulot, 1997
- Horisme jansei D. S. Fletcher, 1956
- Horisme longispicata D. S. Fletcher, 1956
- Horisme lucillata (Guenée, [1858])
- Horisme milvaria (Christoph, 1893)
- Horisme minuata (Walker, 1860)
- Horisme mortuata (Guenée, 1857)
- Horisme nigrovittata (Warren, 1888)
- Horisme obscurata L. B. Prout, 1913
- Horisme pallidimacula L. B. Prout, 1925
- Horisme parcata (Püngeler, 1909)
- Horisme plagiographa Turner, 1922
- Horisme predotai (Bytinski-Salz, 1937)
- Horisme punctiscripta (L. B. Prout, 1917)
- Horisme radicaria (La Harpe, 1855)
- Horisme rectilineata (Taylor, 1907)
- Horisme scorteata (Staudinger, 1901)
- Horisme scotosiata (Guenée, [1858])
- Horisme stratata (Wileman, 1911)
- Horisme tersata (Denis & Schiffermüller, 1775) – fern
- Horisme vitalbata (Denis & Schiffermüller, 1775) – small waved umber
- Horisme wittei Debauche, 1938
- Horisme xerophila Herbulot, 1988
- Horisme xylinata (Warren, 1906)
