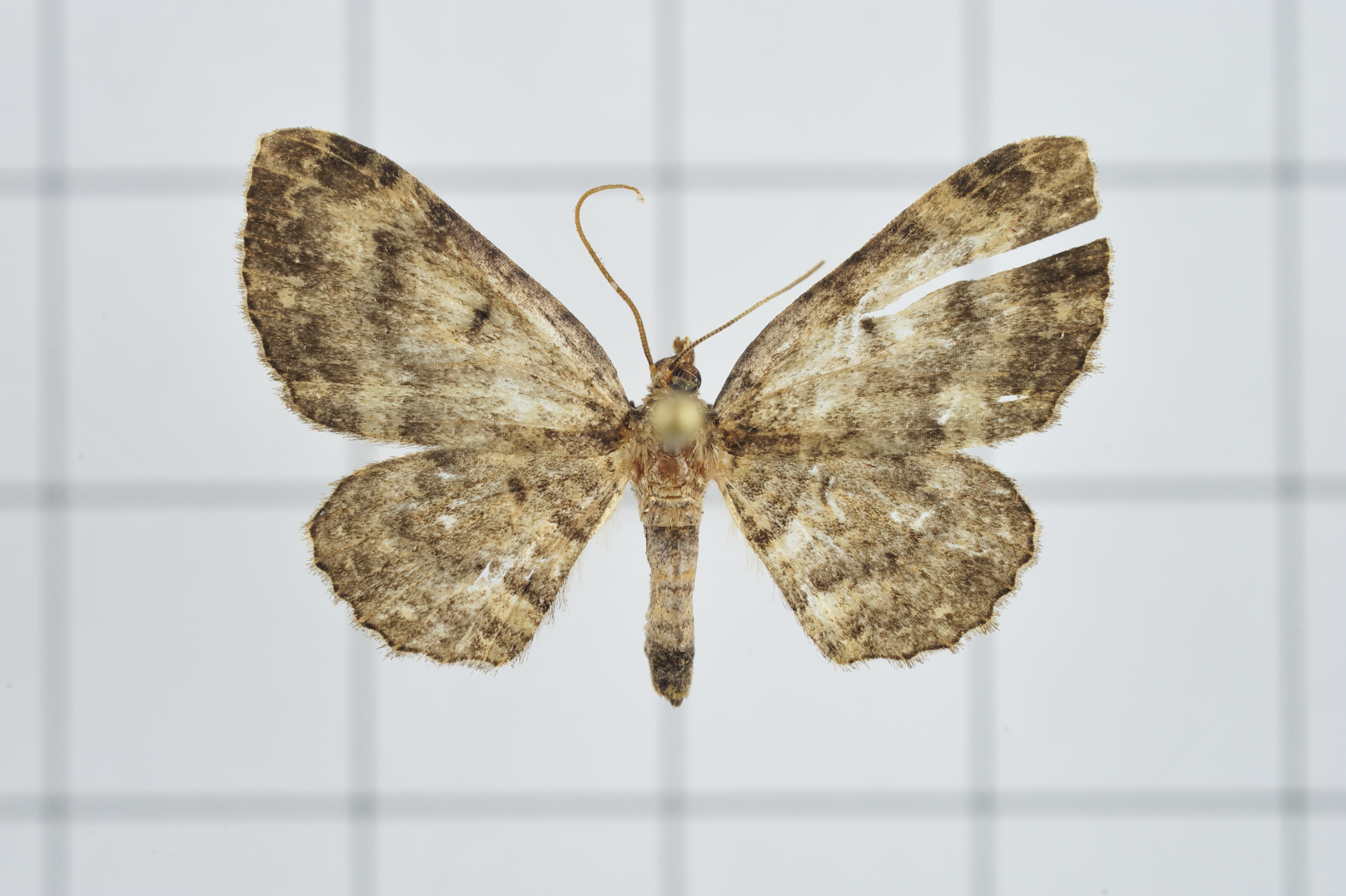

Scientific classification
- Kingdom: Animalia
- Phylum: Arthropoda
- Class: Insecta
- Order: Lepidoptera
- Family: Geometridae
- Genus: Pseudocollix
- Species: P. hyperythra

Binomial name
- Pseudocollix hyperythra (Hampson, 1895)

Synonyms
- Phibalapteryx hyperythra Hampson 1895; Horisme hyperythra; Horisme hyperythra catalalia Prout, 1941

= Pseudocollix hyperythra =

Species of moth

Pseudocollix hyperythra is a moth in the family Geometridae. It is found from Sri Lanka and India to Taiwan and Japan, Burma, Borneo, Java, Luzon and Sulawesi.

Adults are pale brown.

== Subspecies ==
- Pseudocollix hyperythra hyperythra
- Pseudocollix hyperythra catalalia (Prout 1941) (Taiwan)
