= Collix intrepida =

Scientific classification
- Domain: Eukaryota
- Kingdom: Animalia
- Phylum: Arthropoda
- Class: Insecta
- Order: Lepidoptera
- Family: Geometridae
- Genus: Collix
- Species: C. intrepida

Binomial name
- Collix intrepida Prout, 1932

Synonyms
- Horisme intrepida Prout, 1932; Collix flavipuncta Warren, 1901

Species of moth

Collix intrepida is a moth of the family Geometridae. It was described by Prout in 1932. This moth is found in Borneo where it is found in high altitude ranges between 1620 and 2,600 metres (8,500 ft).
