= Collix basicristata =

Scientific classification
- Kingdom: Animalia
- Phylum: Arthropoda
- Clade: Pancrustacea
- Class: Insecta
- Order: Lepidoptera
- Family: Geometridae
- Genus: Collix
- Species: C. basicristata

Binomial name
- Collix basicristata Prout, 1923

Species of moth

Collix basicristata is a moth in the family Geometridae. It is found on Flores.
