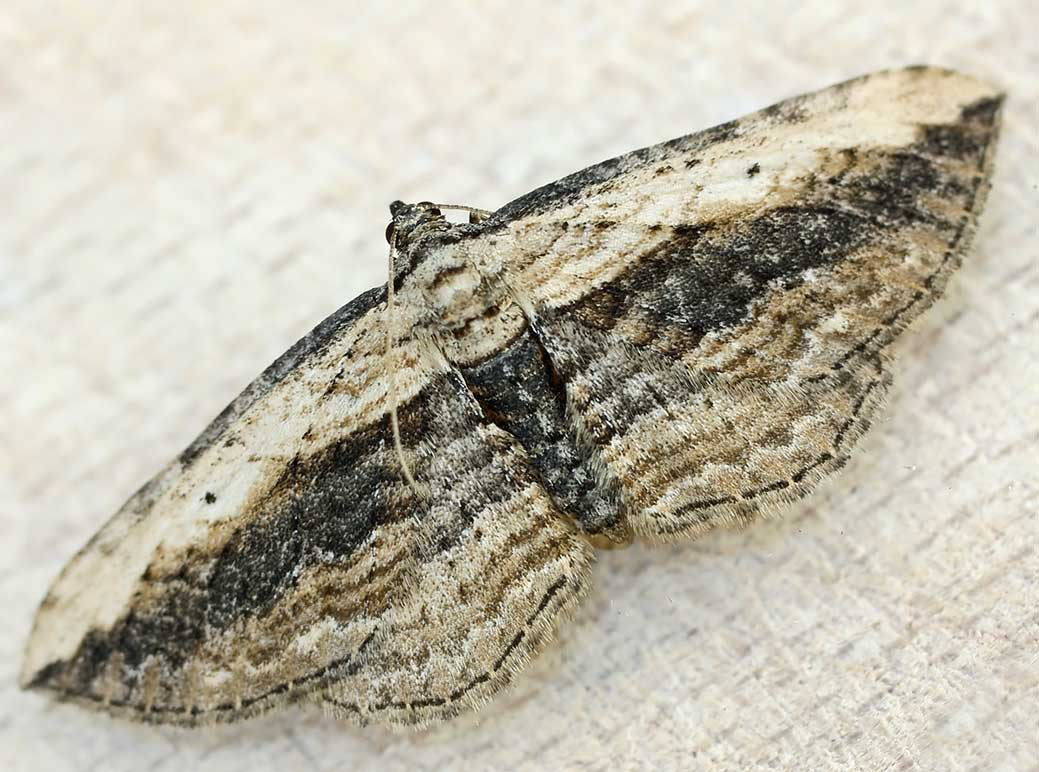

Scientific classification
- Domain: Eukaryota
- Kingdom: Animalia
- Phylum: Arthropoda
- Class: Insecta
- Order: Lepidoptera
- Family: Geometridae
- Genus: Horisme
- Species: H. vitalbata

Binomial name
- Horisme vitalbata (Denis & Schiffermüller, 1775)

= Horisme vitalbata =

Small waved umber

Species of moth

Horisme vitalbata, the small waved umber, is a moth of the family Geometridae. The species was first described by Michael Denis and Ignaz Schiffermüller in 1775. It occurs in Europe.

The wingspan is 30–35 mm. The length of the forewings is 15–17 mm. The moths fly in two generations from May to June and again in August.

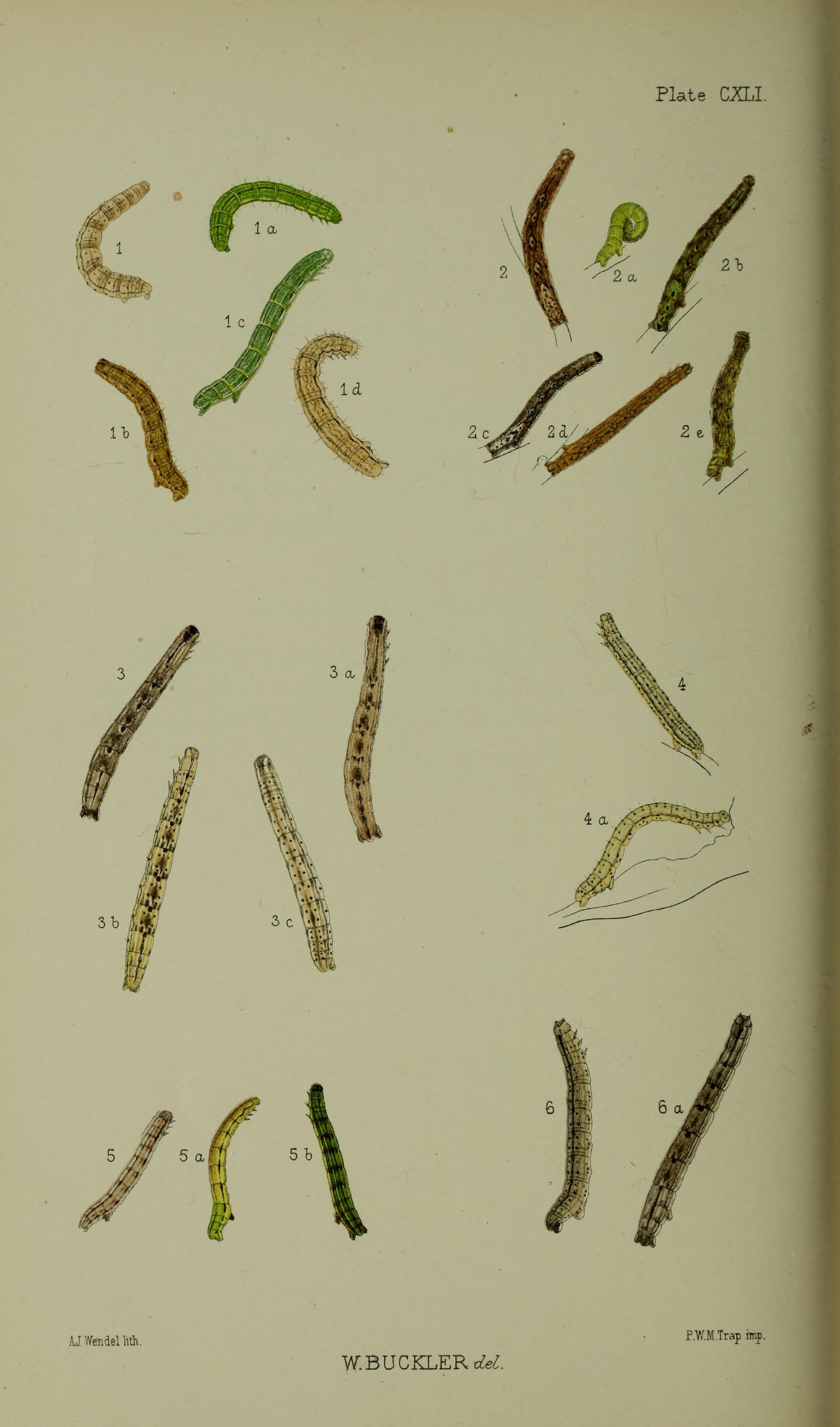
6, 6a larvae after final moult

The larvae feed on Clematis vitalba.

== Notes ==
1. The flight season refers to the British Isles. This may vary in other parts of the range.
