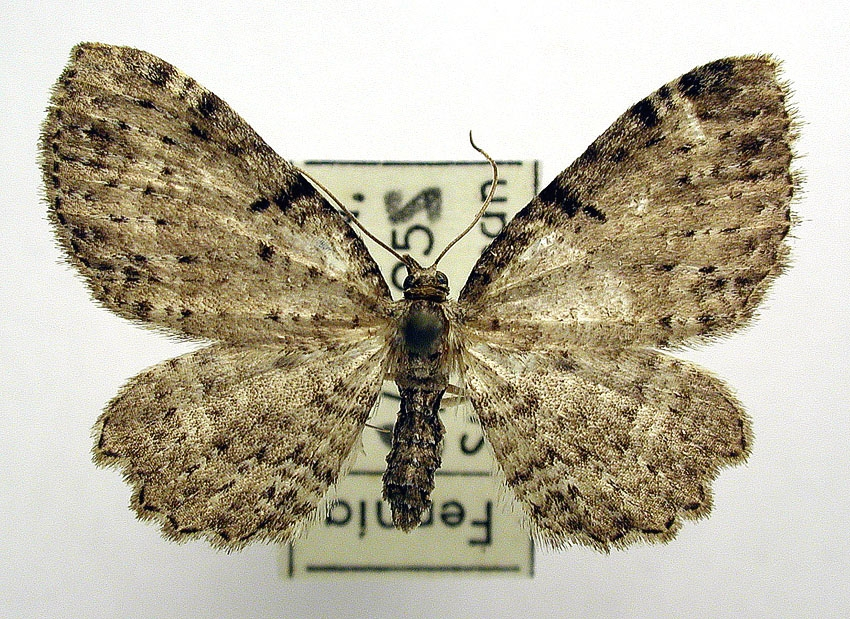

Scientific classification
- Kingdom: Animalia
- Phylum: Arthropoda
- Class: Insecta
- Order: Lepidoptera
- Family: Geometridae
- Genus: Anticollix
- Species: A. sparsata

Binomial name
- Anticollix sparsata (Treitschke, 1828)

Synonyms
- Larentia sparsata Treitschke, 1828; Anticollix sparsatus

= Anticollix sparsata =

Species of moth

Anticollix sparsata, the dentated pug, is a moth of the family Geometridae. The species was first described by Georg Friedrich Treitschke in 1828. It is found across the Palearctic from Europe to Japan.

The wingspan is 20–26 mm. The ground color of the forewings is light brown or grey. Along the costal edge there are most often some square dark spots (usually four), but these can be blurred. In the middle of the wing there are usually two or three small triangular black spots, but no trace of any dark transverse band. It is monochrome grey. Both pairs of wings have small black spots along the outer edges. The larva is slender, green on the back and pale green on the abdomen, with a narrow white lateral stripe. It has scattered, short, bright bristles. See also Prout.

Adults are on wing from May to September in two generations.

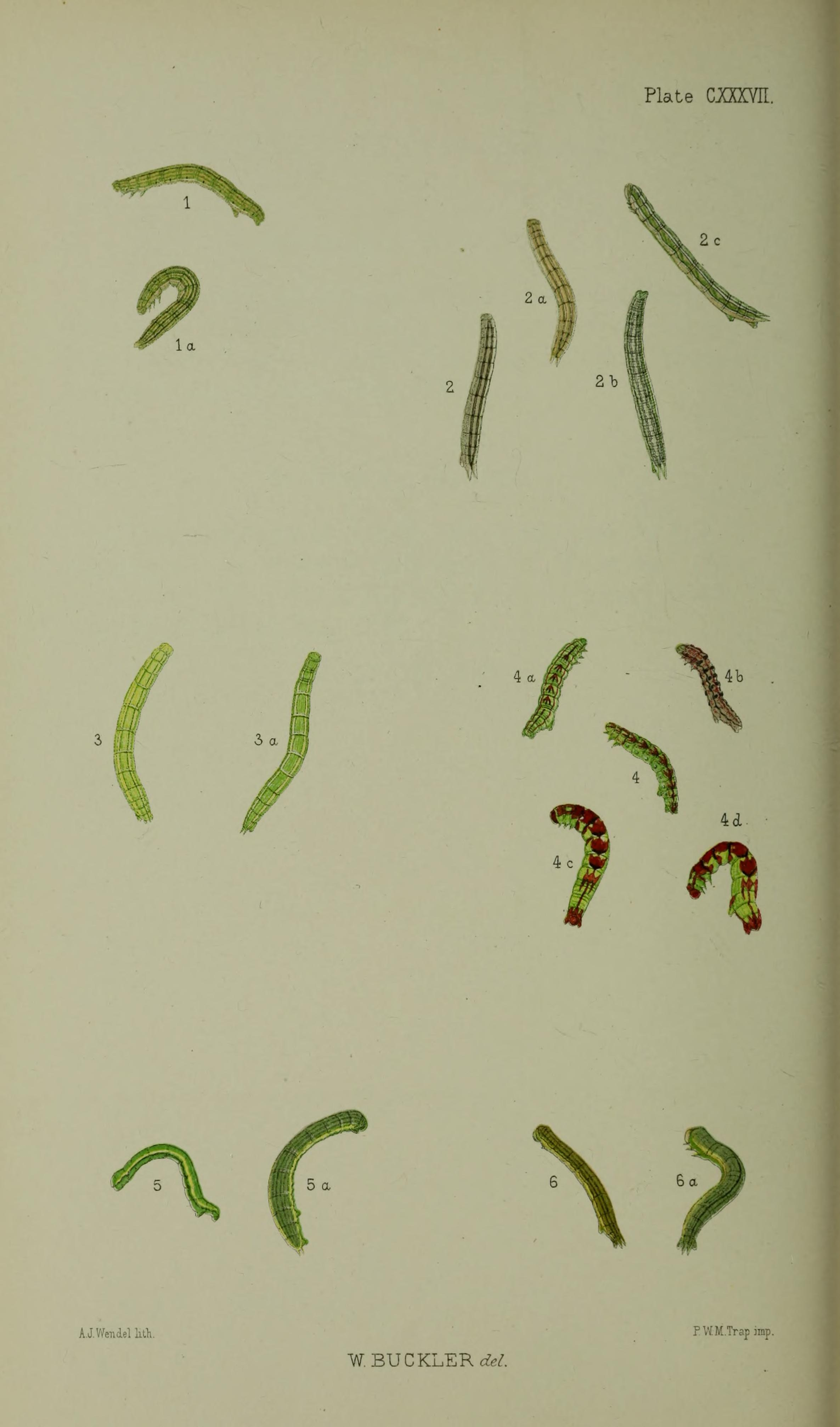
Figs 1,1a larvae after final moult

The larvae feed on the flowers and leaves of Lysimachia vulgaris.
