= Collix ustimacula =

Scientific classification
- Domain: Eukaryota
- Kingdom: Animalia
- Phylum: Arthropoda
- Class: Insecta
- Order: Lepidoptera
- Family: Geometridae
- Genus: Collix
- Species: C. ustimacula

Binomial name
- Collix ustimacula (Warren, 1906)

Synonyms
- Coenocalpe ustimacula Warren, 1906

Species of moth

Collix ustimacula is a moth in the family Geometridae. It is found in New Guinea.
