= Collix erythroides =

Scientific classification
- Kingdom: Animalia
- Phylum: Arthropoda
- Clade: Pancrustacea
- Class: Insecta
- Order: Lepidoptera
- Family: Geometridae
- Genus: Collix
- Species: C. erythroides

Binomial name
- Collix erythroides (Prout, 1941)

Synonyms
- Horisme erythroides Prout, 1941

Species of moth

Collix erythroides is a moth in the family Geometridae. It is found in New Guinea.
