= Collix lasiospila =

Scientific classification
- Kingdom: Animalia
- Phylum: Arthropoda
- Class: Insecta
- Order: Lepidoptera
- Family: Geometridae
- Genus: Collix
- Species: C. lasiospila

Binomial name
- Collix lasiospila (Meyrick, 1886)

Synonyms
- Cidaria lasiospila Meyrick, 1886

Species of moth

Collix lasiospila is a moth in the family Geometridae. It is found on Fiji.
