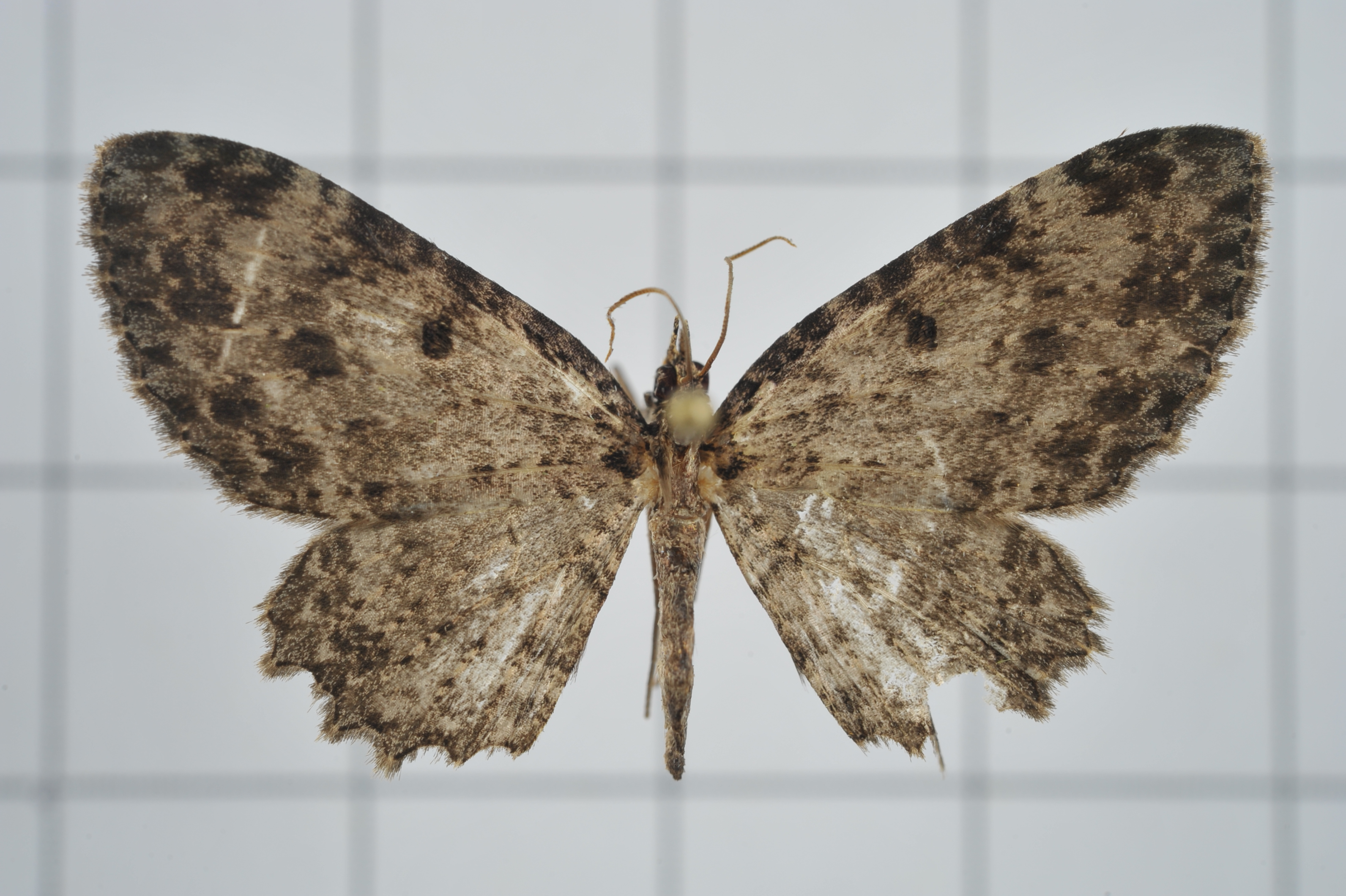

Scientific classification
- Kingdom: Animalia
- Phylum: Arthropoda
- Clade: Pancrustacea
- Class: Insecta
- Order: Lepidoptera
- Family: Geometridae
- Genus: Collix
- Species: C. praetenta

Binomial name
- Collix praetenta Prout, 1929

= Collix praetenta =

Species of moth

Collix praetenta is a moth in the family Geometridae. It is found in the north-eastern Himalayas and Taiwan.
