= Horisme aemulata =

Scientific classification
- Kingdom: Animalia
- Phylum: Arthropoda
- Clade: Pancrustacea
- Class: Insecta
- Order: Lepidoptera
- Family: Geometridae
- Genus: Horisme
- Species: H. aemulata

Binomial name
- Horisme aemulata (Hübner, 1813)

Species of moth

Horisme aemulata is a moth belonging to the family Geometridae. The species was first described by Jacob Hübner in 1813.

It is native to Europe.
