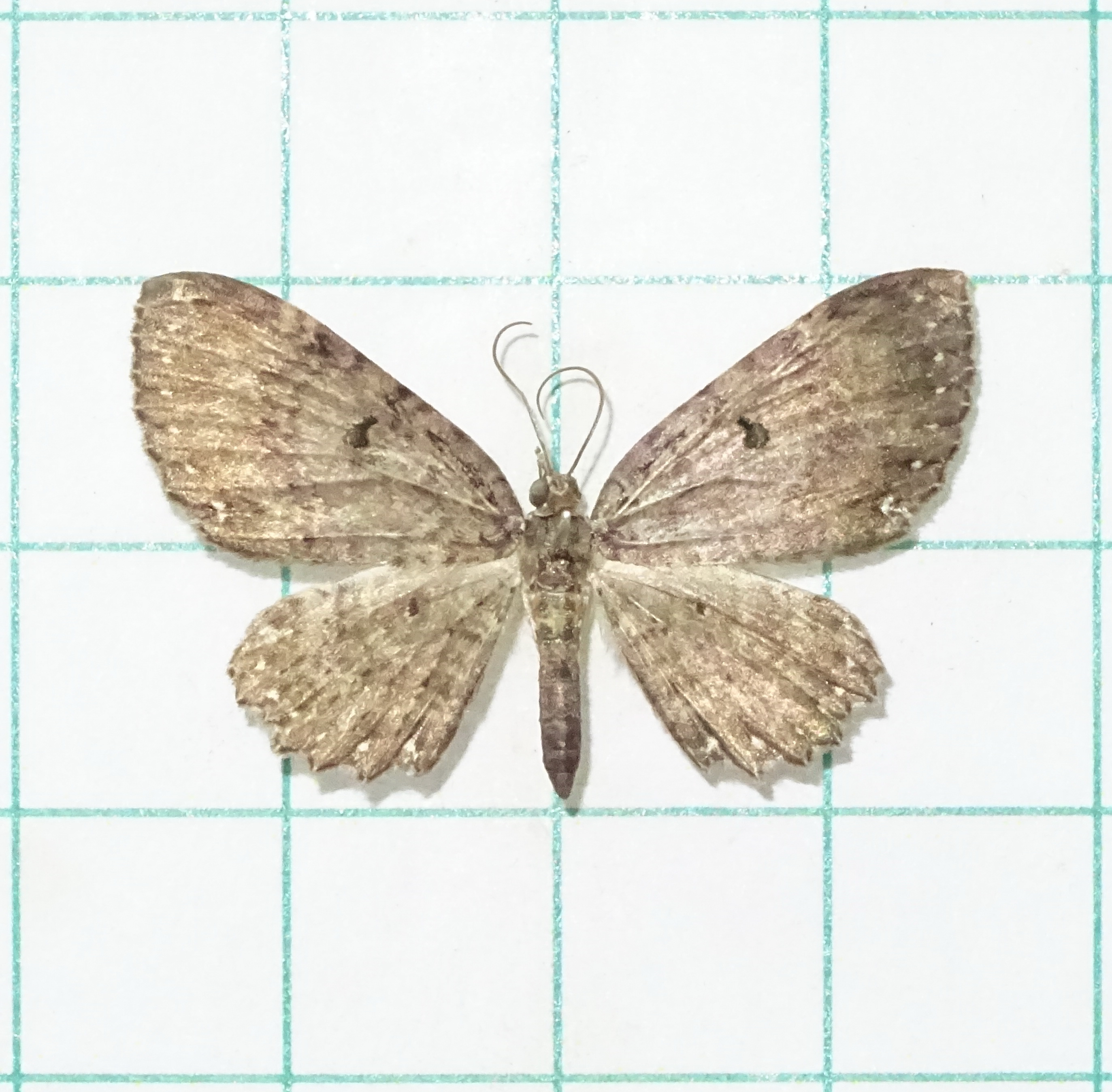

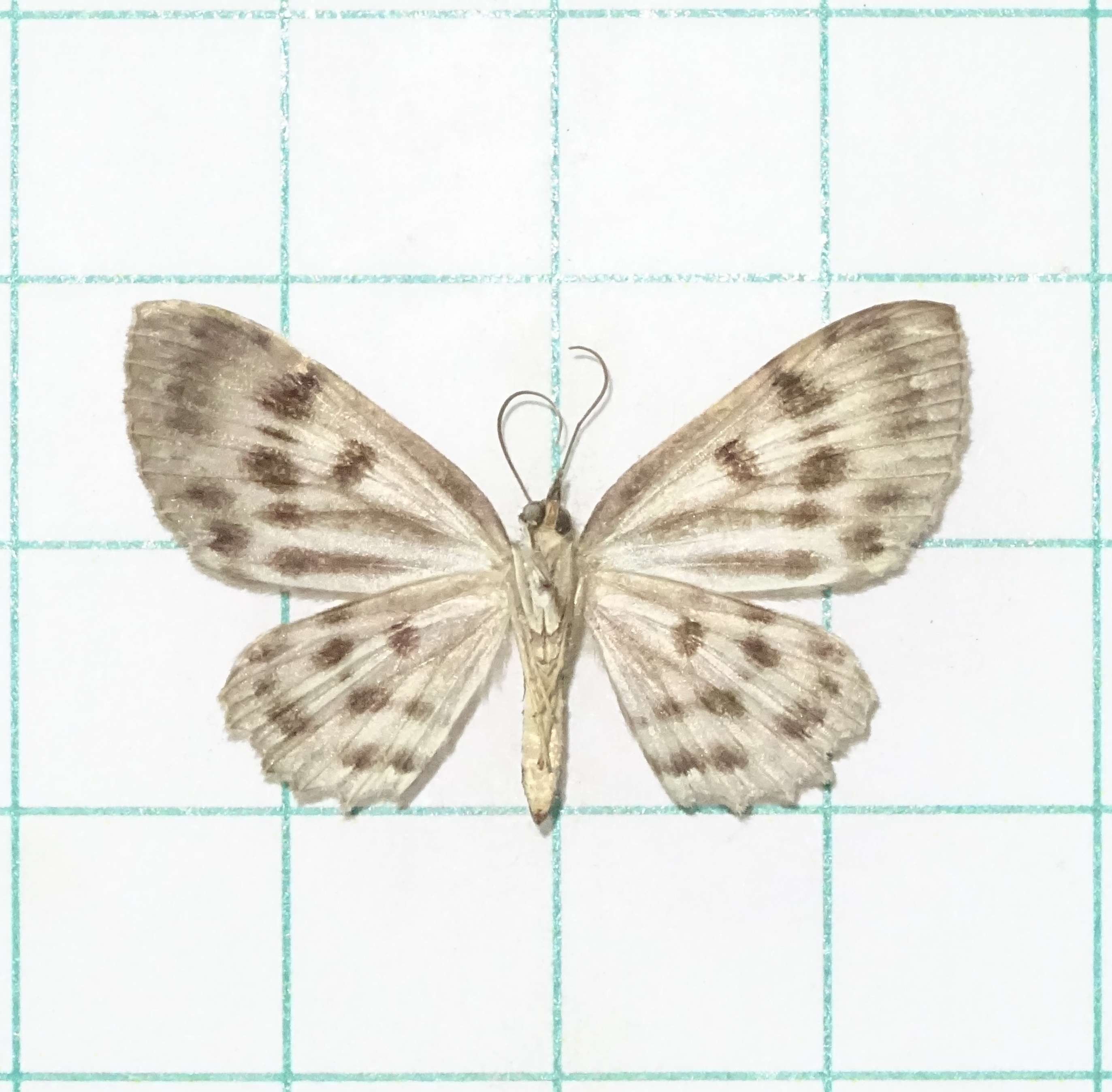
- Ventral view

Scientific classification
- Domain: Eukaryota
- Kingdom: Animalia
- Phylum: Arthropoda
- Class: Insecta
- Order: Lepidoptera
- Family: Geometridae
- Genus: Collix
- Species: C. stellata

Binomial name
- Collix stellata Warren, 1894

Synonyms
- Collix griseipalpis Wileman, 1916; Collix relocata Prout, 1932

= Collix stellata =

Species of moth

Collix stellata is a moth in the family Geometridae first described by William Warren in 1894. It is found in Korea, Japan, Taiwan and northern India.

The wingspan is 26–28 millimetres (1.0–1.1 in). Adults are on wing from early September to October in Korea and Taiwan and in June in Japan.

The larvae feed on Rapanea nerifolia and Lysimachia clethroides in Japan.

== Subspecies ==
- Collix stellata stellata
- Collix stellata oblitera Prout, 1935 (Java)
- Collix stellata phaeochiton Prout, 1932 (Peninsular Malaysia, Borneo)
