= Collix blosyra =

Scientific classification
- Kingdom: Animalia
- Phylum: Arthropoda
- Clade: Pancrustacea
- Class: Insecta
- Order: Lepidoptera
- Family: Geometridae
- Genus: Collix
- Species: C. blosyra

Binomial name
- Collix blosyra Prout, 1926

Species of moth

Collix blosyra is a moth in the family Geometridae. It is found on Borneo. The habitat consists of upper montane forests.
