= Collix adamata =

Scientific classification
- Domain: Eukaryota
- Kingdom: Animalia
- Phylum: Arthropoda
- Class: Insecta
- Order: Lepidoptera
- Family: Geometridae
- Genus: Collix
- Species: C. adamata

Binomial name
- Collix adamata Prout, 1941

Species of moth

Collix adamata is a moth in the family Geometridae. It was described by Prout in 1941. It is found on Sulawesi.

The wingspan is about 39 millimetres (1.5 in).
