= Collix brevipalpis =

Scientific classification
- Domain: Eukaryota
- Kingdom: Animalia
- Phylum: Arthropoda
- Class: Insecta
- Order: Lepidoptera
- Family: Geometridae
- Genus: Collix
- Species: C. brevipalpis

Binomial name
- Collix brevipalpis Herbulot, 1999

Species of moth

Collix brevipalpis is an African moth in the family Geometridae. It is found in Equatorial Guinea, specifically the island of Bioko. Its species name refers to the shortness of its palpi.
