= Collix foraminata =

Scientific classification
- Kingdom: Animalia
- Phylum: Arthropoda
- Class: Insecta
- Order: Lepidoptera
- Family: Geometridae
- Genus: Collix
- Species: C. foraminata

Binomial name
- Collix foraminata Guenee, 1857

Species of moth

Collix foraminata is a moth in the family Geometridae. It is found on the Comoros and Madagascar, as well as in Cameroon, Kenya, South Africa, Tanzania and Uganda.
