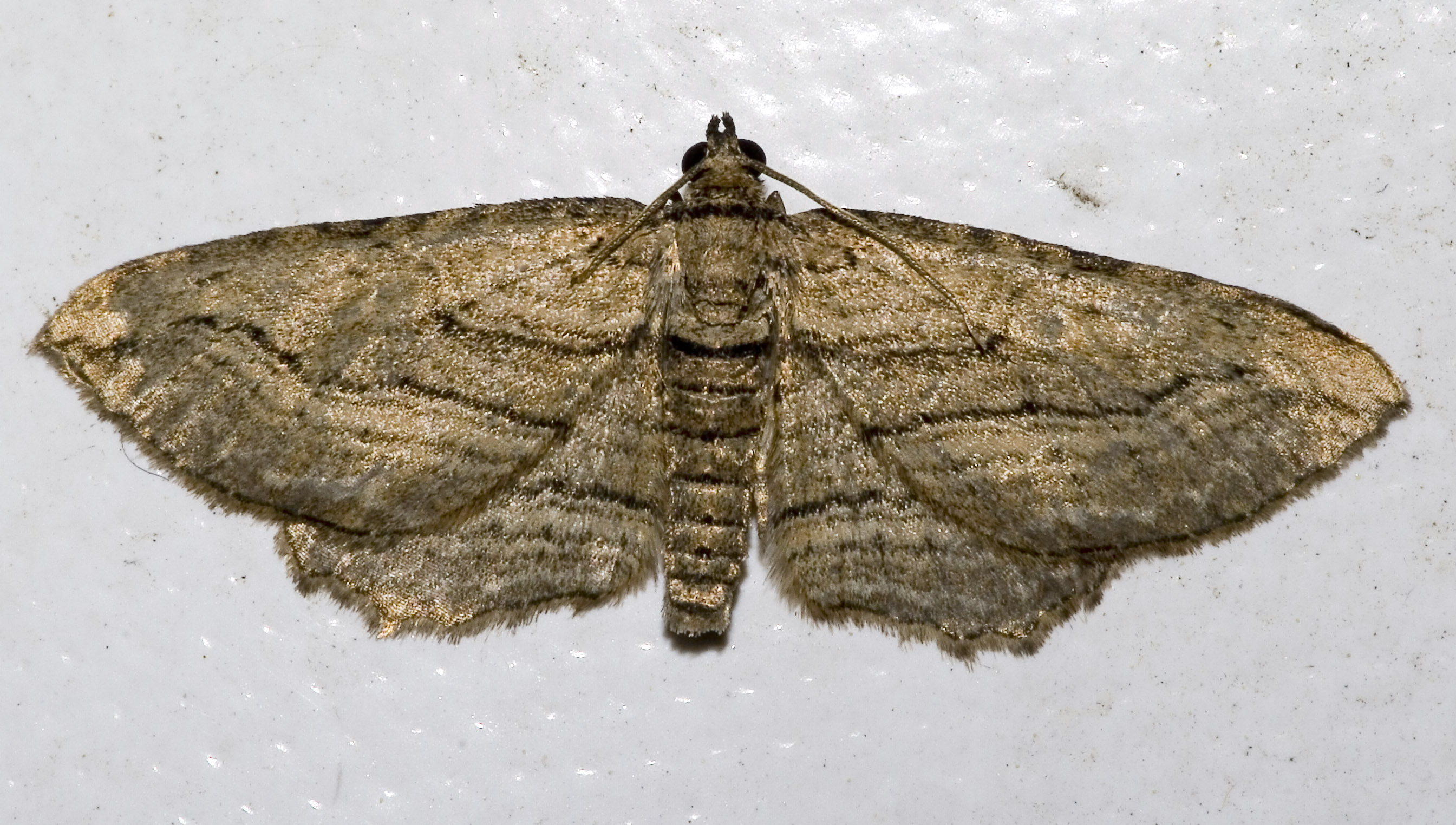

Scientific classification
- Domain: Eukaryota
- Kingdom: Animalia
- Phylum: Arthropoda
- Class: Insecta
- Order: Lepidoptera
- Family: Geometridae
- Genus: Horisme
- Species: H. corticata

Binomial name
- Horisme corticata Treitschke, 1835

Synonyms
- Horisme alutacearia; Acidalia corticata; Phibalapterxy corticata

= Horisme corticata =

Species of moth

Horisme corticata is a moth of the family Geometridae. The species can be found from Denmark up to Poland, Austria, Hungary and Romania and from central Italy, the Balkan and Anatolia up to the Caucasus and Southern Russia.

The wingspan is 26–28 mm. The moths fly from April to September depending on the location.

The larvae feed on Clematis vitalba, Clematis viticella and Anemone sylvestris.
