= Collix leuciota =

Scientific classification
- Domain: Eukaryota
- Kingdom: Animalia
- Phylum: Arthropoda
- Class: Insecta
- Order: Lepidoptera
- Family: Geometridae
- Genus: Collix
- Species: C. leuciota

Binomial name
- Collix leuciota Prout, 1929

Species of moth

Collix leuciota is a moth in the family Geometridae. It was described by Prout in 1929. It is found in India (Sikkim) and Peninsular Malaysia. The wingspan is 36–40 millimetres (1.4–1.6 in).
