= Collix elongata =

Scientific classification
- Domain: Eukaryota
- Kingdom: Animalia
- Phylum: Arthropoda
- Class: Insecta
- Order: Lepidoptera
- Family: Geometridae
- Genus: Collix
- Species: C. elongata

Binomial name
- Collix elongata Warren, 1902

Species of moth

Collix elongata is a moth in the family Geometridae. It is found on the Solomon Islands.
