= Collix rhabdoneura =

Scientific classification
- Kingdom: Animalia
- Phylum: Arthropoda
- Clade: Pancrustacea
- Class: Insecta
- Order: Lepidoptera
- Family: Geometridae
- Genus: Collix
- Species: C. rhabdoneura

Binomial name
- Collix rhabdoneura Prout, 1941

Species of moth

Collix rhabdoneura is a moth in the family Geometridae. It is found in Malaysia.
