= Collix patricia =

Scientific classification
- Domain: Eukaryota
- Kingdom: Animalia
- Phylum: Arthropoda
- Class: Insecta
- Order: Lepidoptera
- Family: Geometridae
- Genus: Collix
- Species: C. patricia

Binomial name
- Collix patricia Robinson, 1975

Species of moth

Collix patricia is a moth in the family Geometridae. It is found on Fiji.
