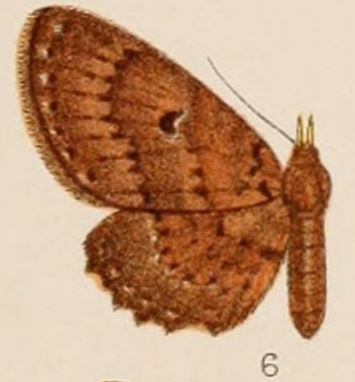

Scientific classification
- Domain: Eukaryota
- Kingdom: Animalia
- Phylum: Arthropoda
- Class: Insecta
- Order: Lepidoptera
- Family: Geometridae
- Genus: Collix
- Species: C. rufipalpis

Binomial name
- Collix rufipalpis (Hampson, 1907)

Synonyms
- Phibalapteryx rufipalpis Hampson, 1907

= Collix rufipalpis =

Species of moth

Collix rufipalpis is a South Asian moth in the family Geometridae. It was first described by George Hampson in 1907. It is found in India and Sri Lanka. It is synonymous with Philbalapteryx rufipalpis.

This species has a wingspan of 46 millimetres (1.8 in).
