= Collix multifilata =

Scientific classification
- Domain: Eukaryota
- Kingdom: Animalia
- Phylum: Arthropoda
- Class: Insecta
- Order: Lepidoptera
- Family: Geometridae
- Genus: Collix
- Species: C. multifilata

Binomial name
- Collix multifilata Warren, 1896

Species of moth

Collix multifilata is a moth in the family Geometridae. It is found in Australia (Queensland).
