= Collix infecta =

Scientific classification
- Kingdom: Animalia
- Phylum: Arthropoda
- Clade: Pancrustacea
- Class: Insecta
- Order: Lepidoptera
- Family: Geometridae
- Genus: Collix
- Species: C. infecta

Binomial name
- Collix infecta Prout, 1923

Species of moth

Collix infecta is a moth in the family Geometridae. It is found in the Russell Islands.
