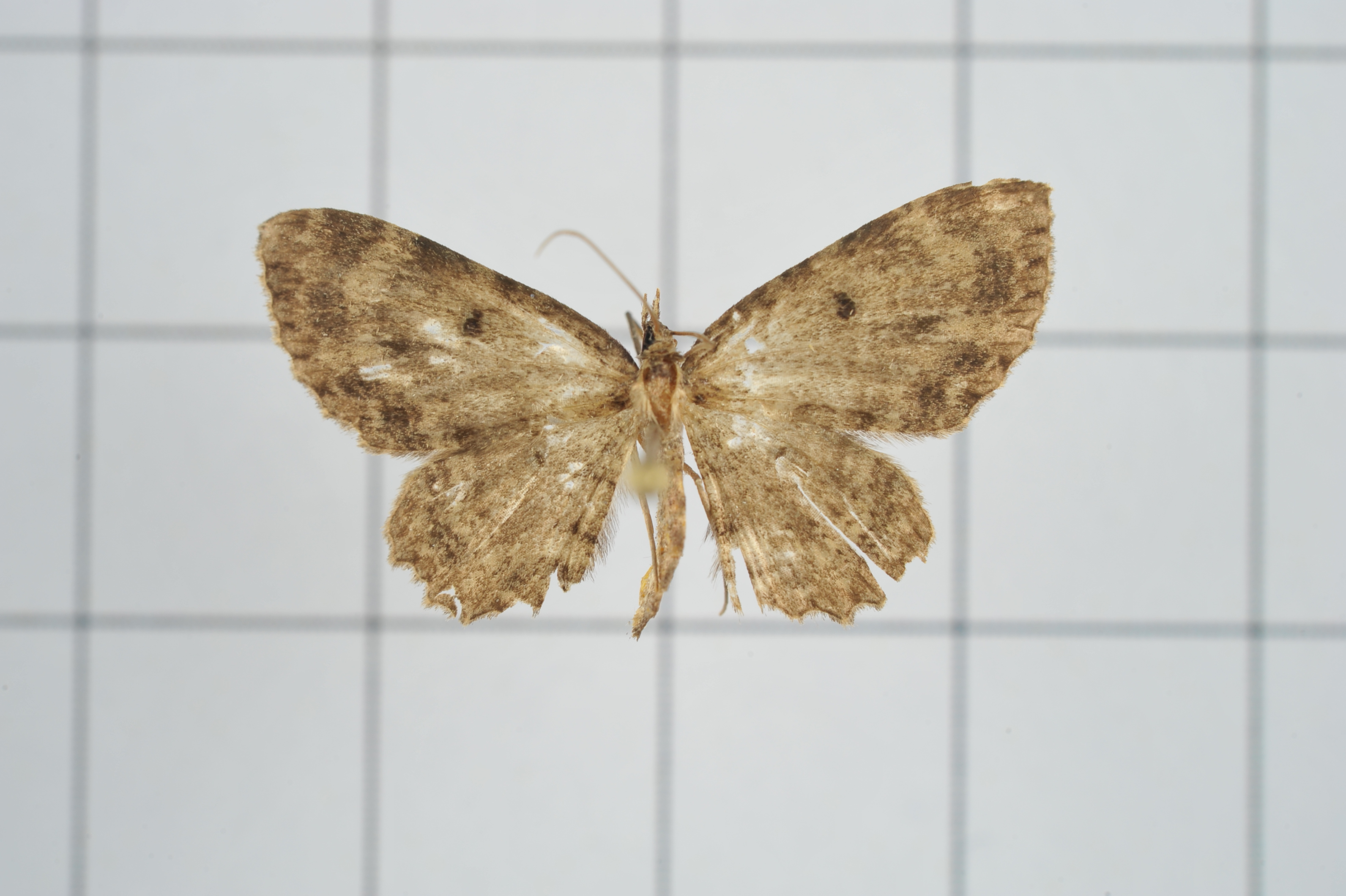

Scientific classification
- Domain: Eukaryota
- Kingdom: Animalia
- Phylum: Arthropoda
- Class: Insecta
- Order: Lepidoptera
- Family: Geometridae
- Genus: Collix
- Species: C. ghosha

Binomial name
- Collix ghosha Walker, 1862

Synonyms
- Collix dichobathra Prout, 1931; Collix mayri Prout, 1958; Collix puncticulata Prout, 1958; Collix sticticata Warren, 1902; Collix subligata Warren, 1896

= Collix ghosha =

Species of moth

Collix ghosha is a moth in the family Geometridae. It was described by Francis Walker in 1862. It is found in the Indo-Australian tropics, from the Indian subregion, Sri Lanka to Queensland, Japan and New Caledonia.

== Description ==
The wingspan of the male is about 28 mm and the female about 28–30 millimetres (1.1–1.2 in). Palpi with the second joint reaching far beyond the frontal tuft. Mid tibia of the male very much dilated and with a deep groove. Ground color of the body greyish brown. The waved lines are more prominent. A postmedial series of pale specks are more or less developed, and the submarginal series obsolescent. Ventral side whitish. Discocellular spots larger. The postmedial band replaced by a streak series, which at middle almost join the submarginal spots, which form an almost complete band except between veins 3 and 4.
