= Kauria =

Scientific classification
- Kingdom: Animalia
- Phylum: Arthropoda
- Class: Insecta
- Order: Lepidoptera
- Family: Geometridae
- Tribe: Melanthiini
- Genus: Kauria

Genus of moths

Kauria is a rare genus of moth in the family Geometridae, found most commonly in the Appalachian Mountains.
