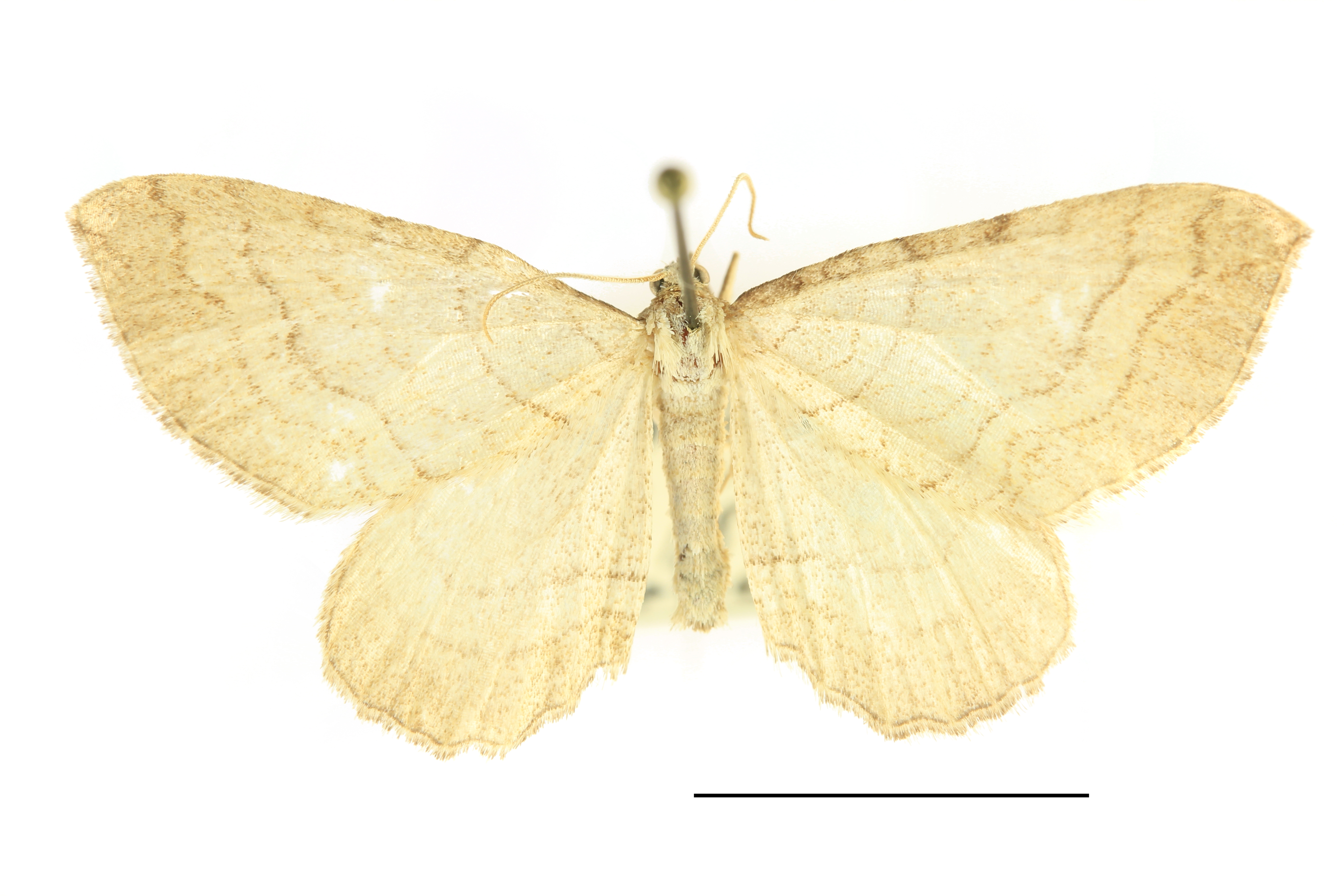
- Coenocalpe lapidata, insect collections Swedish University of Agricultural Sciencesa

Scientific classification
- Kingdom: Animalia
- Phylum: Arthropoda
- Clade: Pancrustacea
- Class: Insecta
- Order: Lepidoptera
- Family: Geometridae
- Tribe: Melanthiini
- Genus: Coenocalpe; Hübner, 1825

= Coenocalpe =

Genus of moths

Coenocalpe is a genus of moths in the family Geometridae erected by Jacob Hübner in 1825.

== Species ==
- Coenocalpe lapidata (Hübner, 1809) – slender-striped rufous
- Coenocalpe millierata (Staudinger, 1901)
