= Echthrocollix =

Scientific classification
- Kingdom: Animalia
- Phylum: Arthropoda
- Class: Insecta
- Order: Lepidoptera
- Family: Geometridae
- Tribe: Melanthiini
- Genus: Echthrocollix; Inoue, 1953

Genus of moths

Echthrocollix is a genus of moths in the family Geometridae.

== Species ==
- Echthrocollix minuta (Butler, 1881)
