= Collix examplata =

Scientific classification
- Domain: Eukaryota
- Kingdom: Animalia
- Phylum: Arthropoda
- Class: Insecta
- Order: Lepidoptera
- Family: Geometridae
- Genus: Collix
- Species: C. examplata

Binomial name
- Collix examplata Warren, 1906

Species of moth

Collix examplata is a moth in the family Geometridae. It is found in New Guinea.
