= Collix rufidorsata =

Scientific classification
- Domain: Eukaryota
- Kingdom: Animalia
- Phylum: Arthropoda
- Class: Insecta
- Order: Lepidoptera
- Family: Geometridae
- Genus: Collix
- Species: C. rufidorsata

Binomial name
- Collix rufidorsata Prout, 1929

Species of moth

Collix rufidorsata is a moth in the family Geometridae. It was described by Louis Beethoven Prout in 1929. It is found on Java, Borneo, the Bismarck Archipelago and New Guinea. It has one subspecies, promulgata, which is darker, more reddish-purple, and less markedly banded than the name-typical variety.

== Subspecies ==
- Collix rufidorsata rufidorsata (Java, Borneo)
- Collix rufidorsata promulgata Prout, 1929 (New Guinea, Bismarck Islands)
