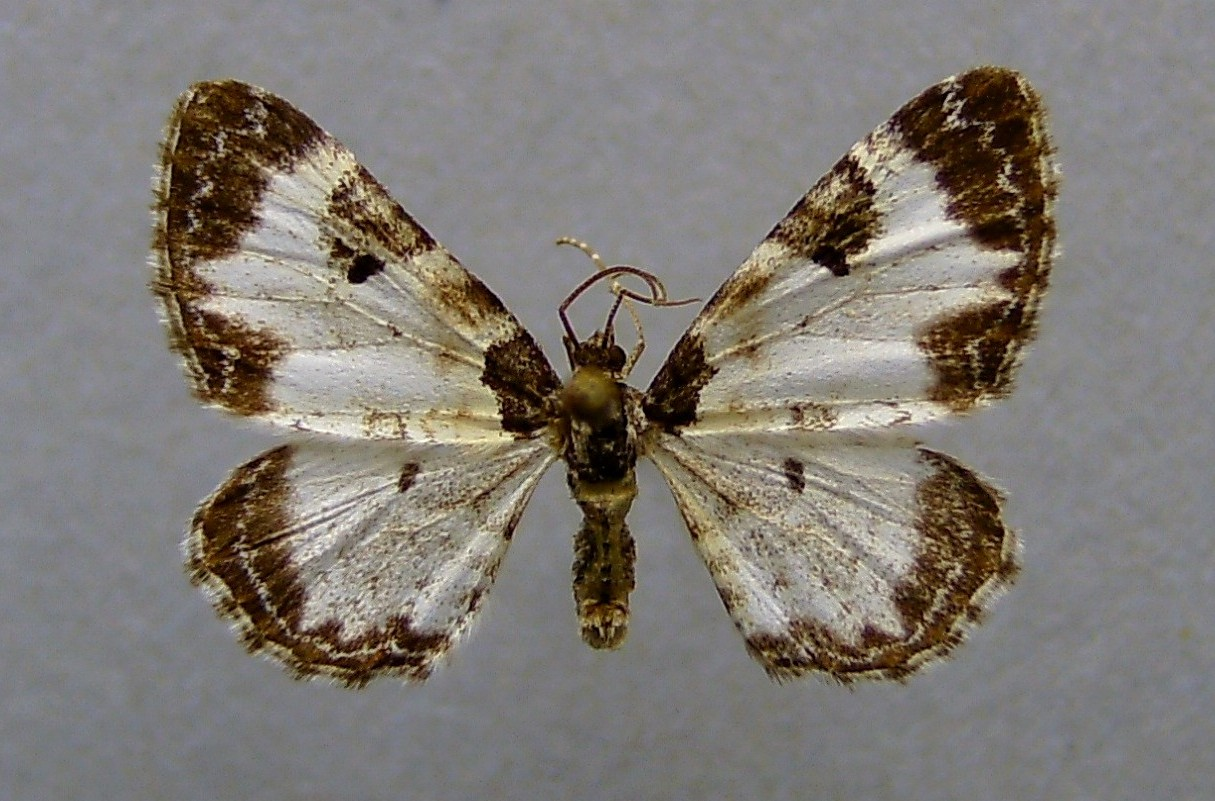

Scientific classification
- Domain: Eukaryota
- Kingdom: Animalia
- Phylum: Arthropoda
- Class: Insecta
- Order: Lepidoptera
- Family: Geometridae
- Genus: Melanthia
- Species: M. alaudaria

Binomial name
- Melanthia alaudaria (Freyer, 1846)

Synonyms
- Zerene alaudaria Freyer, 1846

= Melanthia alaudaria =

Species of moth

Melanthia alaudaria is a moth of the family Geometridae. It has a local distribution in central Europe.

The wingspan is 18–24 mm. Adults are on wing from the end of May to the beginning of July.
