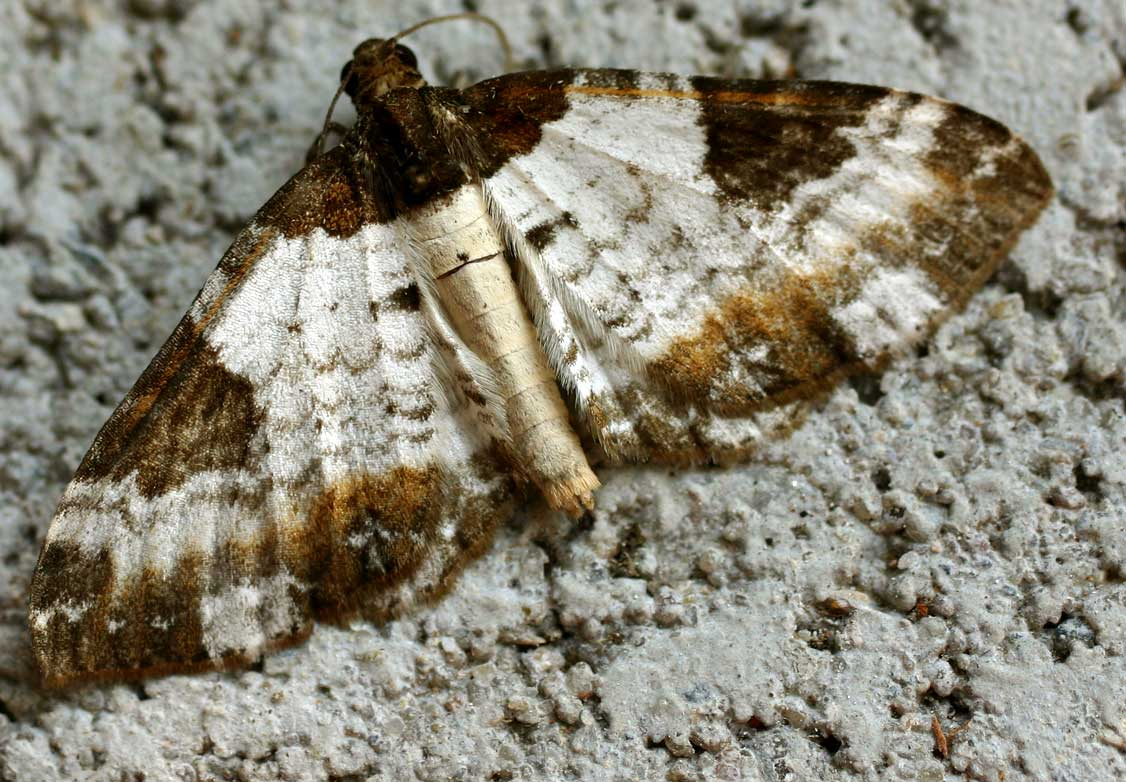
- Melanthia procellata

Scientific classification
- Kingdom: Animalia
- Phylum: Arthropoda
- Class: Insecta
- Order: Lepidoptera
- Family: Geometridae
- Tribe: Melanthiini
- Genus: Melanthia; Duponchel, 1829

= Melanthia =

Genus of moths

Melanthia is a genus of moths in the family Geometridae erected by Philogène Auguste Joseph Duponchel in 1829.

== Species ==
- Melanthia alaudaria (Freyer, 1846)
- Melanthia procellata (Denis & Schiffermüller, 1775) – pretty chalk carpet
