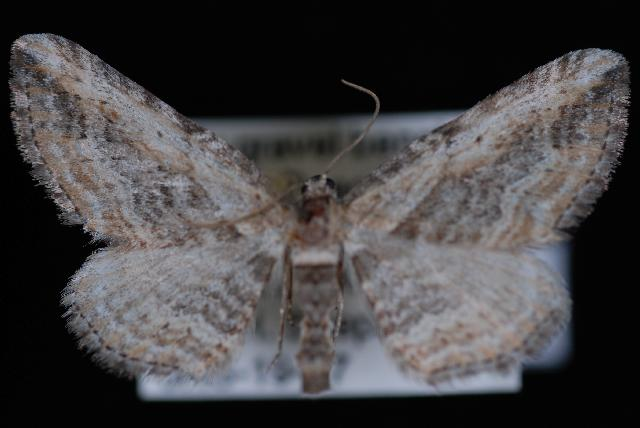

Scientific classification
- Domain: Eukaryota
- Kingdom: Animalia
- Phylum: Arthropoda
- Class: Insecta
- Order: Lepidoptera
- Family: Geometridae
- Tribe: Eupitheciini
- Genus: Horisme
- Species: H. incana

Binomial name
- Horisme incana Swett, 1917

= Horisme incana =

Species of moth

Horisme incana is a species of moth in the family Geometridae that was first described by Louis W. Swett in 1917. It is found in North America.
