= Pseudocollix kawamurai =

Scientific classification
- Kingdom: Animalia
- Phylum: Arthropoda
- Class: Insecta
- Order: Lepidoptera
- Family: Geometridae
- Genus: Pseudocollix
- Species: P. kawamurai

Binomial name
- Pseudocollix kawamurai (Inoue, 1972)

Synonyms
- Horisme kawamurai Inoue, 1972

Species of moth

Pseudocollix kawamurai is a moth in the family Geometridae. It is found in Japan.

The larvae feed on Maesa japonica.
