= Collix mesopora =

Scientific classification
- Kingdom: Animalia
- Phylum: Arthropoda
- Clade: Pancrustacea
- Class: Insecta
- Order: Lepidoptera
- Family: Geometridae
- Genus: Collix
- Species: C. mesopora

Binomial name
- Collix mesopora Prout, 1932

Species of moth

Collix mesopora is a moth in the family Geometridae. It is found on the Borneo, the Philippines and Sulawesi.
