= Collix biokoensis =

Scientific classification
- Domain: Eukaryota
- Kingdom: Animalia
- Phylum: Arthropoda
- Class: Insecta
- Order: Lepidoptera
- Family: Geometridae
- Genus: Collix
- Species: C. biokoensis

Binomial name
- Collix biokoensis Herbulot, 1999

Species of moth

Collix biokoensis is a moth in the family Geometridae. It is found in Equatorial Guinea (Bioko).
