= Bundelia =

Scientific classification
- Kingdom: Animalia
- Phylum: Arthropoda
- Class: Insecta
- Order: Lepidoptera
- Family: Geometridae
- Tribe: Melanthiini
- Genus: Bundelia; Viidalepp, 1988

Genus of insects

Bundelia is a genus of moths in the family Geometridae.

== Species ==
- Bundelia ochracea Viidalepp, 1988
