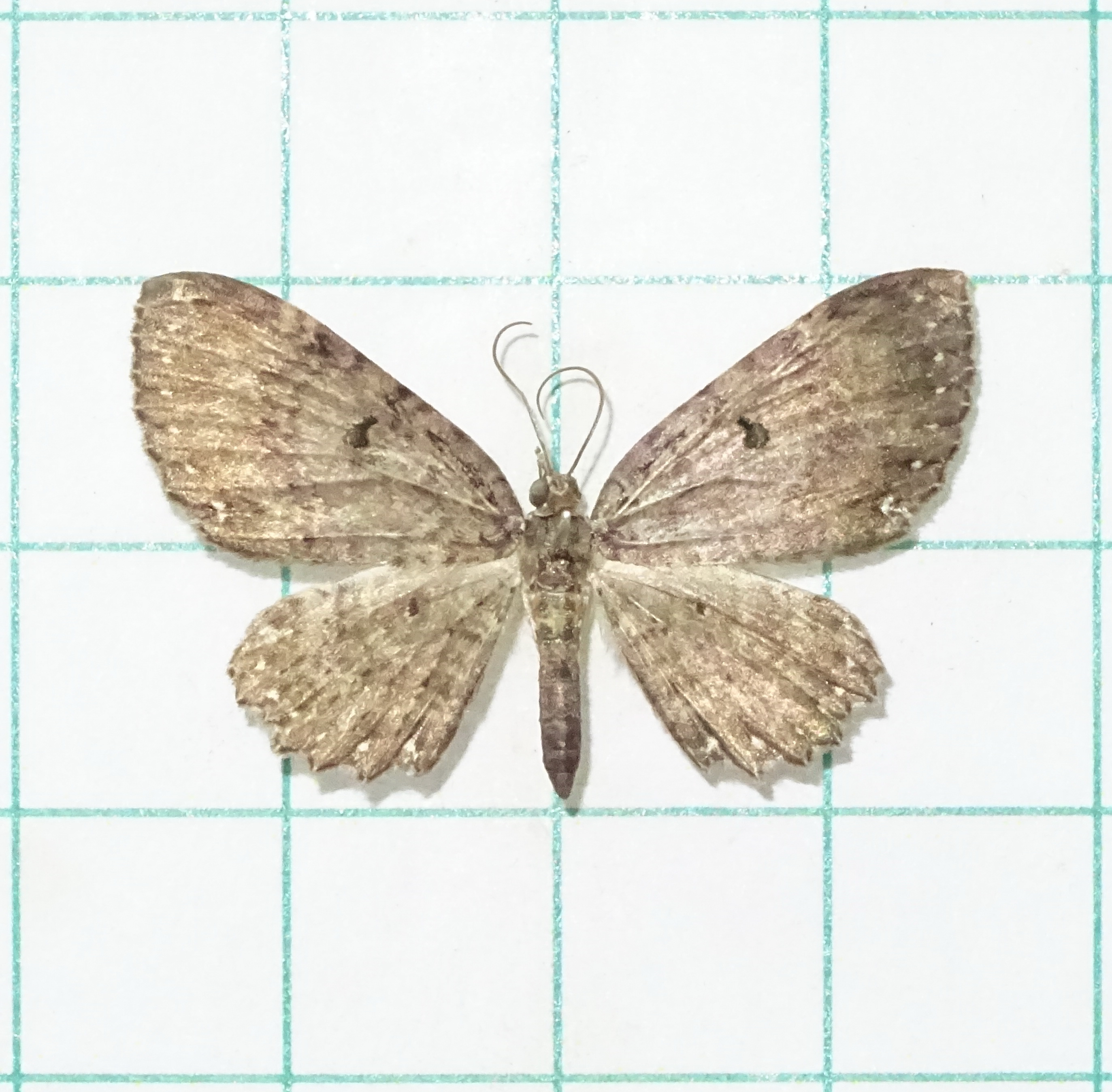
- Collix stellata

Scientific classification
- Kingdom: Animalia
- Phylum: Arthropoda
- Class: Insecta
- Order: Lepidoptera
- Family: Geometridae
- Subfamily: Larentiinae
- Tribe: Melanthiini
- Genus: Collix; Guenée, 1857

Synonyms
- Collyx Janse, 1933

= Collix =

Genus of moths

Collix is a genus of moths in the family Geometridae first described by Achille Guenée in 1857.

== Species ==
- Collix adamata
- Collix angustipennis
- Collix astathes
- Collix basicristata
- Collix biokoensis
- Collix blosyra
- Collix brevipalpis
- Collix elongata
- Collix erythroides
- Collix examplata
- Collix foraminata
- Collix ghosha Walker, 1862 (from India)
- Collix griseipalpis Wileman, 1916 (from India)
- Collix haploscelis
- Collix hirtivena
- Collix hypospilata Guenée, 1858 (from India)
- Collix inaequata
- Collix infecta
- Collix intrepida
- Collix lasiospila
- Collix leuciota Prout, 1924 (from India)
- Collix mesopora
- Collix multifilata
- Collix muscosata
- Collix olivia
- Collix patricia
- Collix praetenta
- Collix psephena
- Collix purpurilita
- Collix rhabdoneura
- Collix rufidorsata
- Collix rufipalpis (Hampson, 1907) (from India)
- Collix stellata Warren, 1894 (from India)
- Collix stenoplia
- Collix suffusca
- Collix ustimacula
