= Collix haploscelis =

Scientific classification
- Kingdom: Animalia
- Phylum: Arthropoda
- Clade: Pancrustacea
- Class: Insecta
- Order: Lepidoptera
- Family: Geometridae
- Genus: Collix
- Species: C. haploscelis

Binomial name
- Collix haploscelis Prout, 1925

Species of moth

Collix haploscelis is a moth in the family Geometridae. It is found on New Hanover Island.
