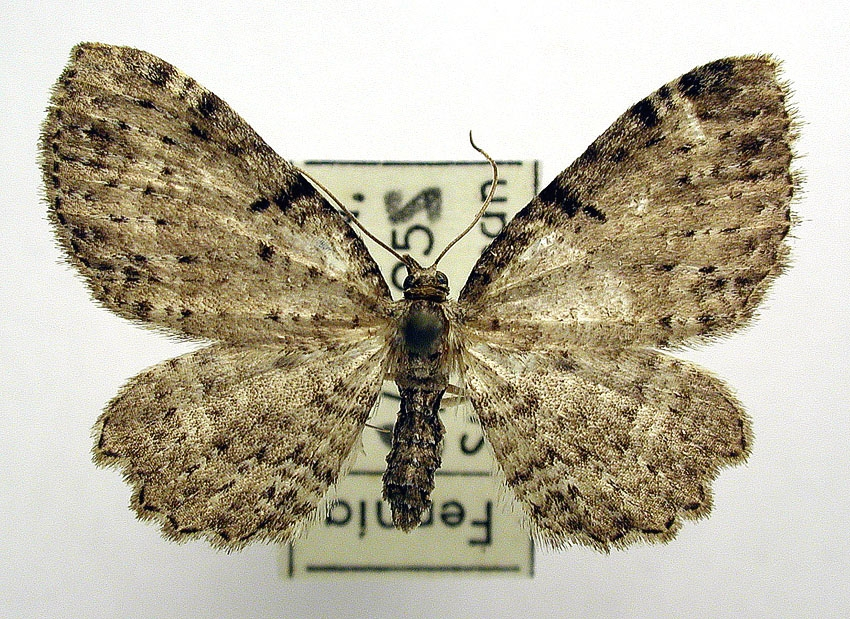
- Anticollix sparsata

Scientific classification
- Kingdom: Animalia
- Phylum: Arthropoda
- Clade: Pancrustacea
- Class: Insecta
- Order: Lepidoptera
- Family: Geometridae
- Tribe: Melanthiini
- Genus: Anticollix; Prout, 1938

= Anticollix =

Genus of geometer moths

Anticollix is a genus of moths in the family Geometridae.

== Species ==
- Anticollix lysimachiata
- Anticollix melanoparia
- Anticollix nigricata
- Anticollix obscura
- Anticollix sparsatus – dentated pug moth (Treitschke, 1828)
