= Collix olivia =

Scientific classification
- Domain: Eukaryota
- Kingdom: Animalia
- Phylum: Arthropoda
- Class: Insecta
- Order: Lepidoptera
- Family: Geometridae
- Genus: Collix
- Species: C. olivia

Binomial name
- Collix olivia Robinson, 1975

Species of moth

Collix olivia is a moth in the family Geometridae. It is found on Fiji.
