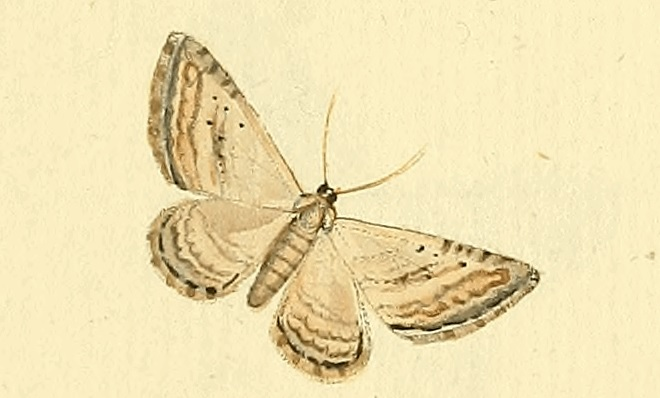

Scientific classification
- Domain: Eukaryota
- Kingdom: Animalia
- Phylum: Arthropoda
- Class: Insecta
- Order: Lepidoptera
- Family: Geometridae
- Genus: Horisme
- Species: H. aquata

Binomial name
- Horisme aquata (Hübner, 1813)

Synonyms
- Geometra aquata Hubner, 1813; Phibalapteryx brisciacensis Dannehl, 1933

= Horisme aquata =

Species of moth

Horisme aquata, the Cumbrian umber, is a moth of the family Geometridae. Jacob Hübner first used the scientific name in 1813. It is found in Europe, where it has been recorded from Spain, France, Belgium, the Netherlands, Germany, Denmark, Sweden, Switzerland, Austria, Italy, Slovenia, Poland, Hungary, Romania, Latvia, Lithuania and Ukraine, to Russia and China.

The wingspan is 15–27 mm.

The larvae feed on Pulsatilla species.

== Subspecies ==
- Horisme aquata aquata
- Horisme aquata kansuensis Sheljuzhko 1955
- Horisme aquata wanquana Yang, 1978
