= Collix hirtivena =

Scientific classification
- Kingdom: Animalia
- Phylum: Arthropoda
- Class: Insecta
- Order: Lepidoptera
- Family: Geometridae
- Genus: Collix
- Species: C. hirtivena

Binomial name
- Collix hirtivena (Warren, 1906)

Synonyms
- Coenocalpe hirtivena Warren, 1906

Species of moth

Collix hirtivena is a moth in the family Geometridae. It is found in New Guinea. Its wings range from drab brown to rust-colored.
