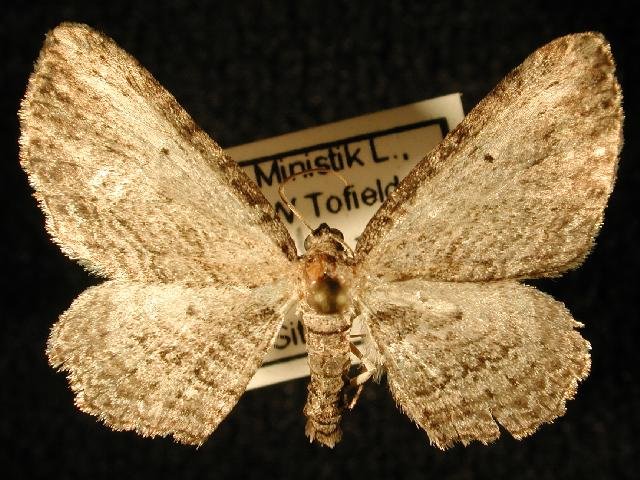

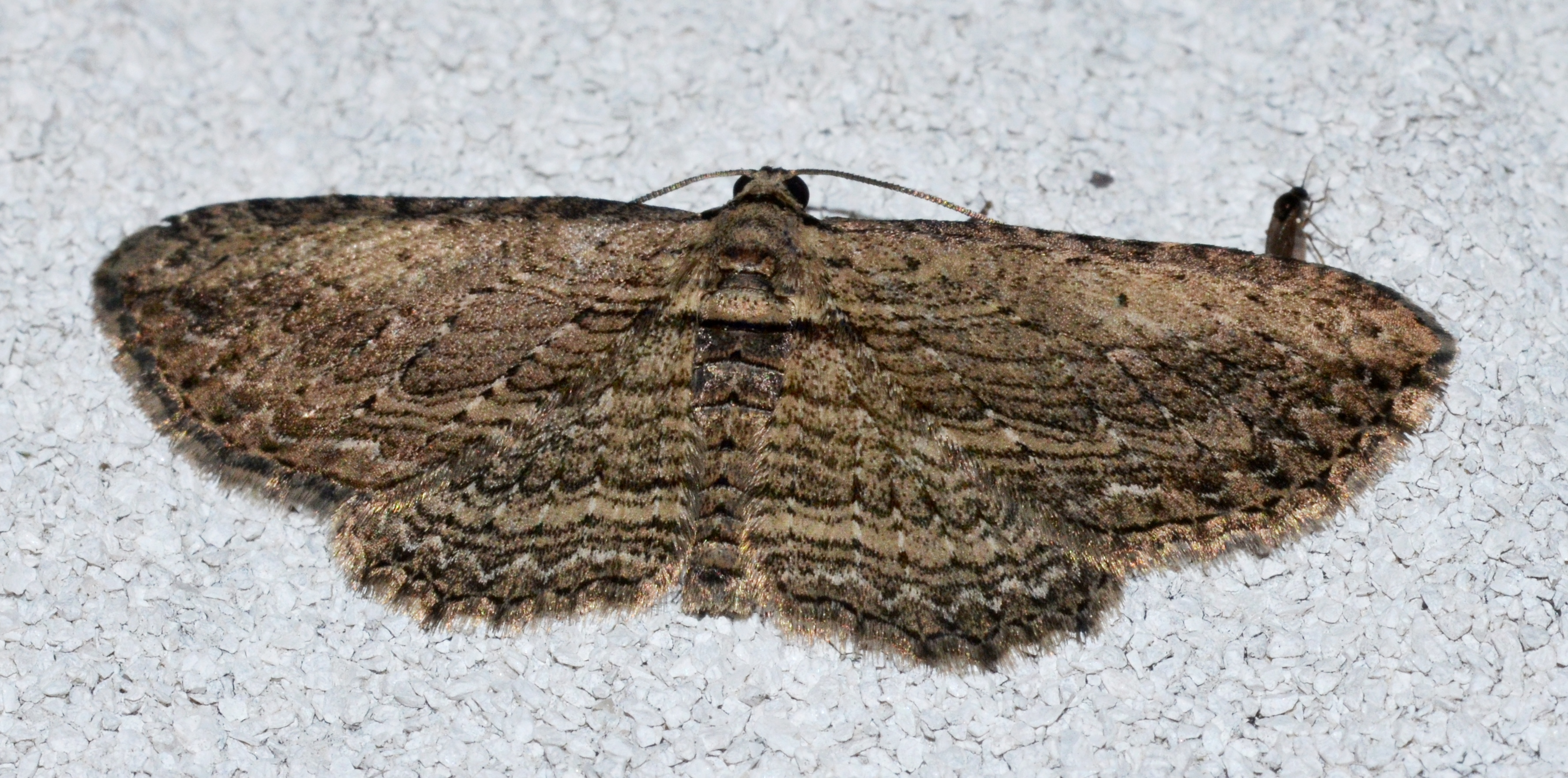

Scientific classification
- Kingdom: Animalia
- Phylum: Arthropoda
- Class: Insecta
- Order: Lepidoptera
- Family: Geometridae
- Genus: Horisme
- Species: H. intestinata

Binomial name
- Horisme intestinata (Guenee, 1857)

Synonyms
- Phibalapteryx intestinata Guenee, 1857; Phibalapteryx impleta Walker, 1866; Phibalapteryx indoctrinata Walker, 1863

= Horisme intestinata =

Species of moth

Horisme intestinata, the brown bark carpet moth, is a moth of the family Geometridae. It is widespread throughout most of temperate North America. The habitat consists of wooded areas.

The wingspan is 21–32 mm. Adults are on wing from late May to late July and again from early September to early October.

The larvae have been recorded feeding on garden Clematis.
