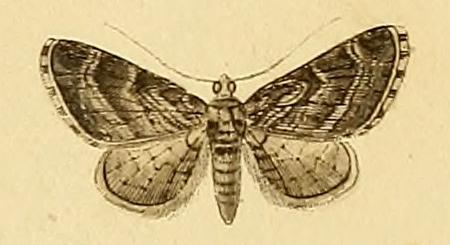

Scientific classification
- Domain: Eukaryota
- Kingdom: Animalia
- Phylum: Arthropoda
- Class: Insecta
- Order: Lepidoptera
- Family: Geometridae
- Genus: Eupithecia
- Species: E. ericeata

Binomial name
- Eupithecia ericeata (Rambur, 1833)

Synonyms
- Larentia ericeata Rambur, 1833; Eupithecia millierata Staudinger, 1871; Eupithecia euxinata Bohatsch, 1893

= Eupithecia ericeata =

Species of moth

Eupithecia ericeata is a moth in the family Geometridae first described by Jules Pierre Rambur in 1833. It is found in most of southern Europe and the Near East.

The wingspan is about 17–19 mm.

The larvae feed on Erica, Juniperus and Cytisus species.

== Subspecies ==
- Eupithecia ericeata ericeata
- Eupithecia ericeata euxinata Bohatsch, 1893 (Ukraine, Greece)
