= Pseudocollix =

Scientific classification
- Kingdom: Animalia
- Phylum: Arthropoda
- Class: Insecta
- Order: Lepidoptera
- Family: Geometridae
- Tribe: Melanthiini
- Genus: Pseudocollix; Warren, 1895

Type species
- Phibalapteryx hyperythra Hampson, 1895

Genus of moths

Pseudocollix is a genus of moths in the family Geometridae.

== Species ==
- Pseudocollix hyperythra (Hampson, 1895)
- Pseudocollix kawamurai (Inoue, 1972)
