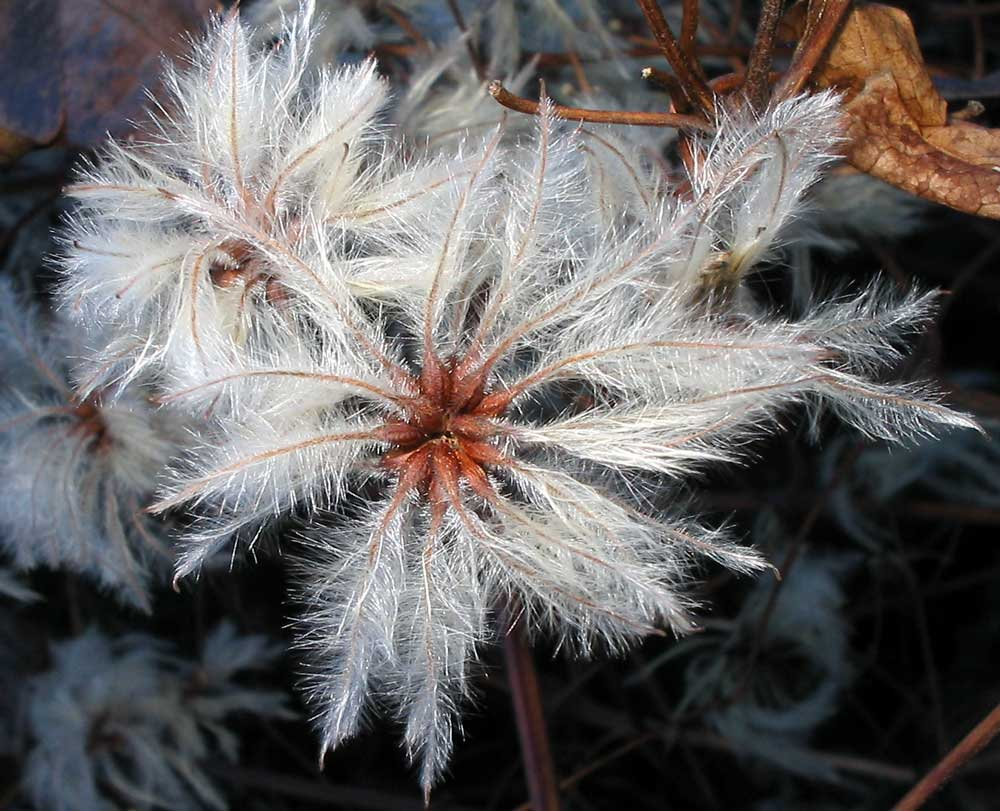
- The silky appendages of the fruits

Scientific classification
- Kingdom: Plantae
- Clade: Tracheophytes
- Clade: Angiosperms
- Clade: Eudicots
- Order: Ranunculales
- Family: Ranunculaceae
- Genus: Clematis
- Species: C. vitalba

Binomial name
- Clematis vitalba L.

= Clematis vitalba =

Flowering plant

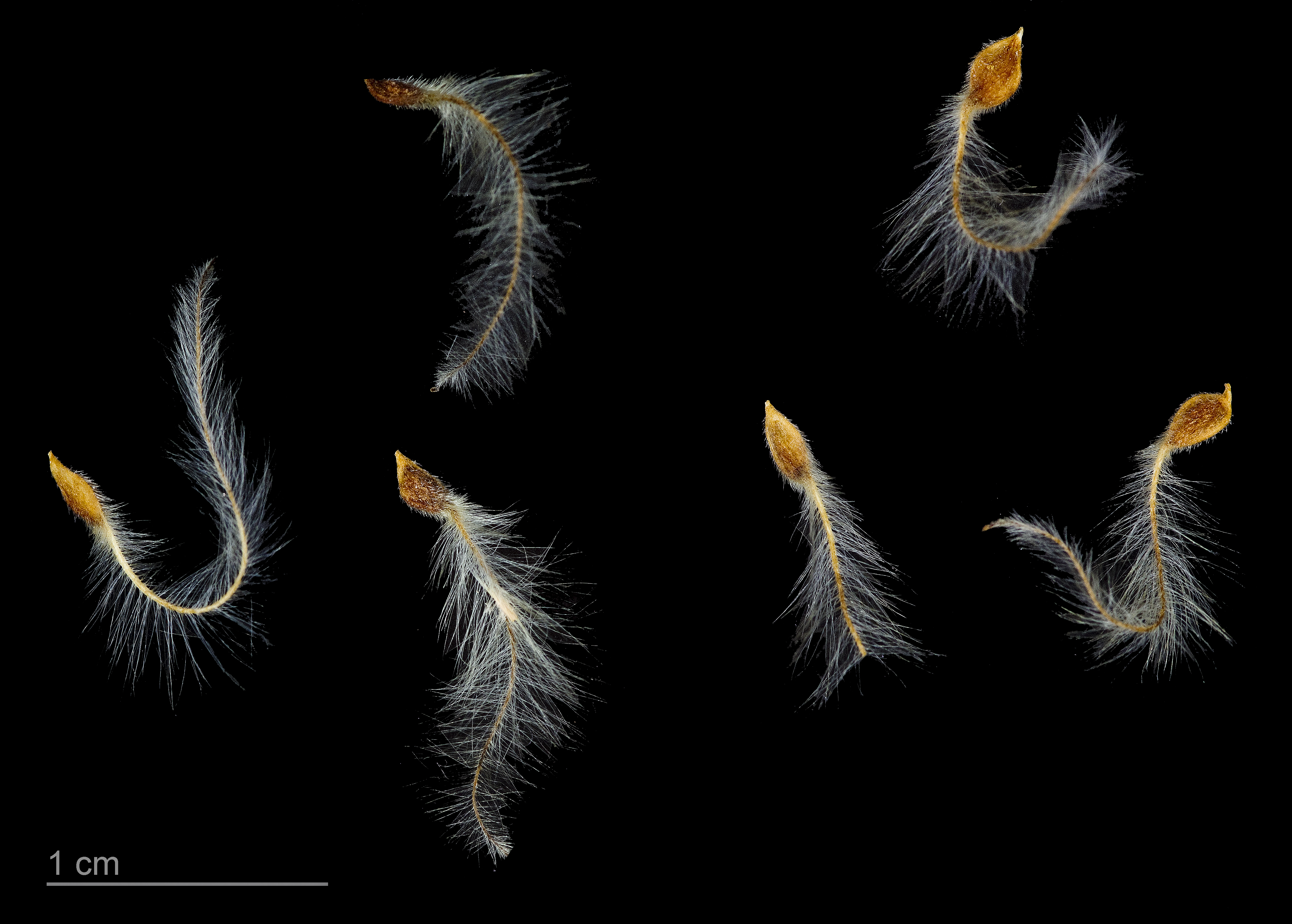
Clematis vitalba fruits and seeds

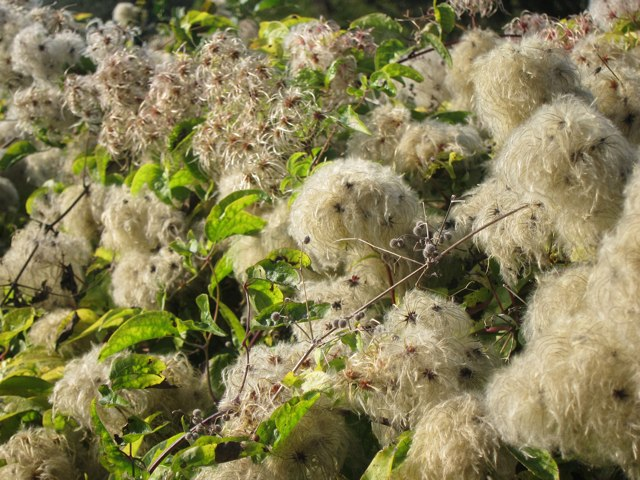
Old Man's Beard, in Kent, England.

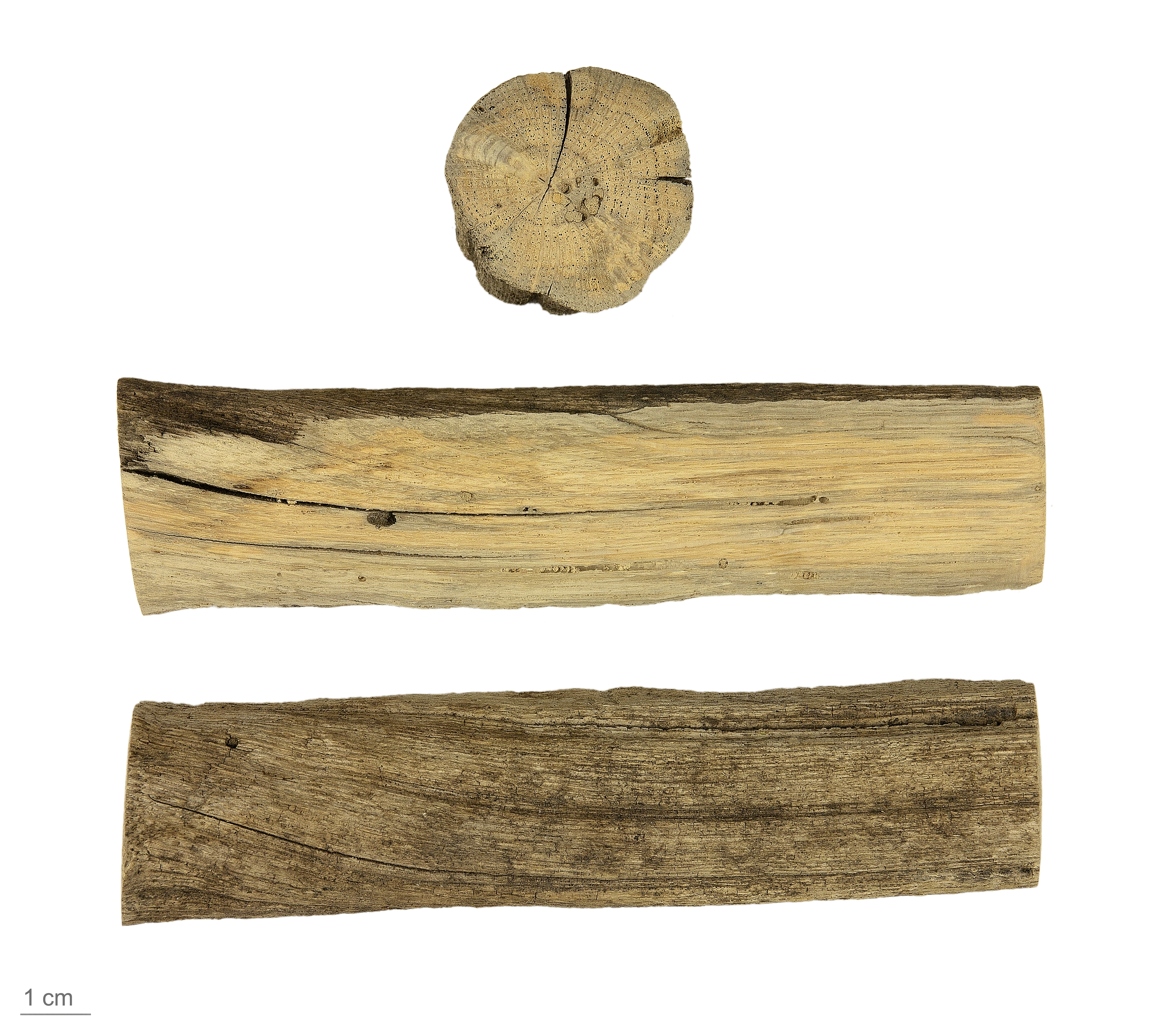
Clematis vitalba stem

Clematis vitalba (also known as old man's beard and traveller's joy) is a shrub in the genus Clematis of the family Ranunculaceae. It is native to Europe and western Asia.

== Description ==
Clematis vitalba is a climbing shrub with branched, grooved stems, deciduous leaves, and scented greeny-white flowers with fluffy underlying sepals. The many fruits formed in each inflorescence have long silky appendages which, seen together, give the characteristic appearance of old man's beard. The grooves along the stems of C. vitalba can easily be felt when handling the plant.

This species is eaten by the larvae of a wide range of moths. This includes many species which are reliant on it as their sole foodplant; including small emerald, small waved umber and Haworth's pug.

== Range ==
C. vitalba has a preference for base rich alkaline soils and moist climate with warm summers. The species is native to Eurasia and North Africa.

=== United Kingdom ===
In the UK it is a native plant and is common throughout England south of a line between the River Mersey and the River Humber. It also commonly occurs in southern, eastern and northern Wales. Outside of these areas it is widely planted and occurs as far north as the southern highlands of Scotland.

=== As an invasive species ===
Owing to its prolific reproductive system, vigor and climbing habit,Clematis vitalba is an invasive plant in many regions. Capable of rapid growth, its climbs several times faster than English ivy, with a single plan able to produce more than 100,000 seeds; it can also propagate vegetatively through stem and root fragmentation.

==== New Zealand ====
In New Zealand it is declared an "unwanted organism" and is listed in the National Pest Plant Accord. It cannot be sold, propagated or distributed. It is a potential threat to native plants since it grows vigorously and forms a canopy which smothers other plants and has no natural controlling organisms in New Zealand. Species of Clematis native to New Zealand have smooth stems and can easily be differentiated from C. vitalba by touch.

==== North America ====
In North America, old man's beard is considered an invasive species. It is found in Washington, Oregon, California, and British Columbia. The species is also found in the eastern United States. The species was introduced as an ornamental plant in the Pacific Northwest sometime between 1950 and 1970.

== Names ==
The name "traveller's joy" was given to the plant by herbalist John Gerard, who wrote in his 1597 Herball that he gave it that name because the plant was found "adorning waies and hedges where people travel". The plant is also known as wild clematis, old man’s beard, shepherd’s delight and smokewood.

== Characteristics ==
- Reproductive organs:
  - Inflorescence type: biparous cyme
  - Sex: hermaphrodite
  - Type of pollination: entomophilous
- Seed:
  - Type of fruit: achene
  - Dissemination: With the wind
- Habitat and distribution:
  - Type of habitat: Mid-European shrubberies, mountainsides, in moderately eutrophic regions
  - Distribution: Holarctic

C. vitalba grows well in limey soils.

== Diseases ==
C. vitalba suffers from tomato spotted wilt virus.

== Use ==
Clematis vitalba was used to make rope during the Stone Age in Switzerland. In Slovenia, the stems of the plant were used for binding crops and weaving baskets for onions. It was particularly useful for binding sheaves of grain because mice do not gnaw on it. In Italy, the sprouts are harvested to make omelettes (called "vitalbini" in Tuscany, "visoni" in Veneto).

== Gallery ==
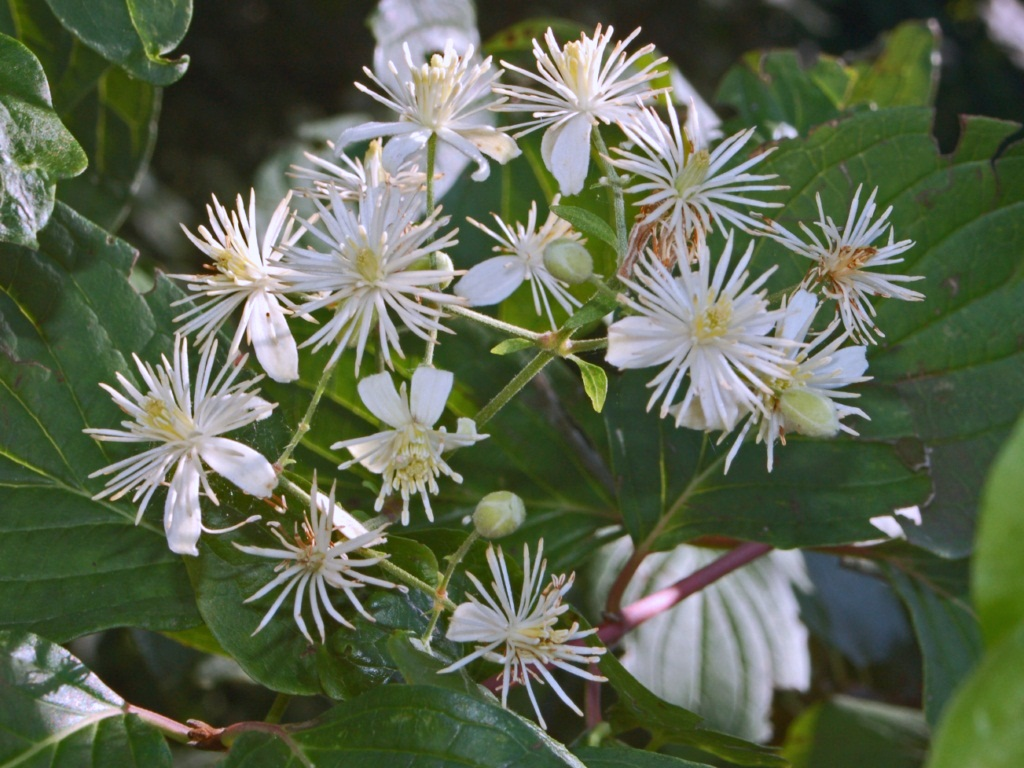
Flowers

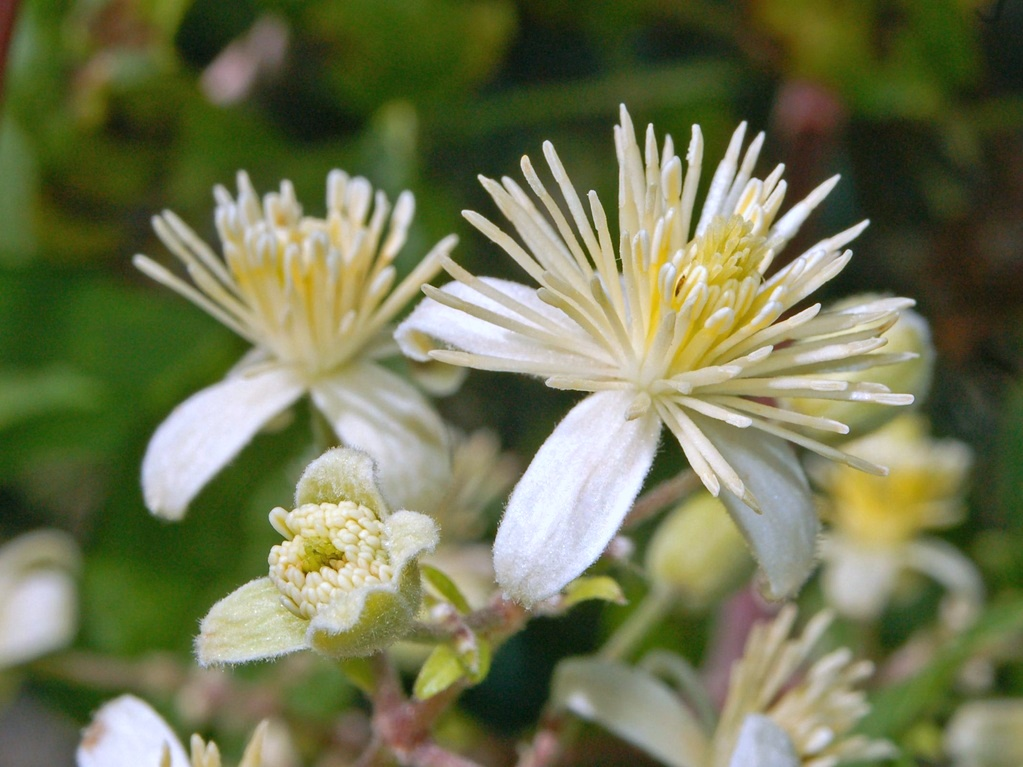
Close-up of a flower

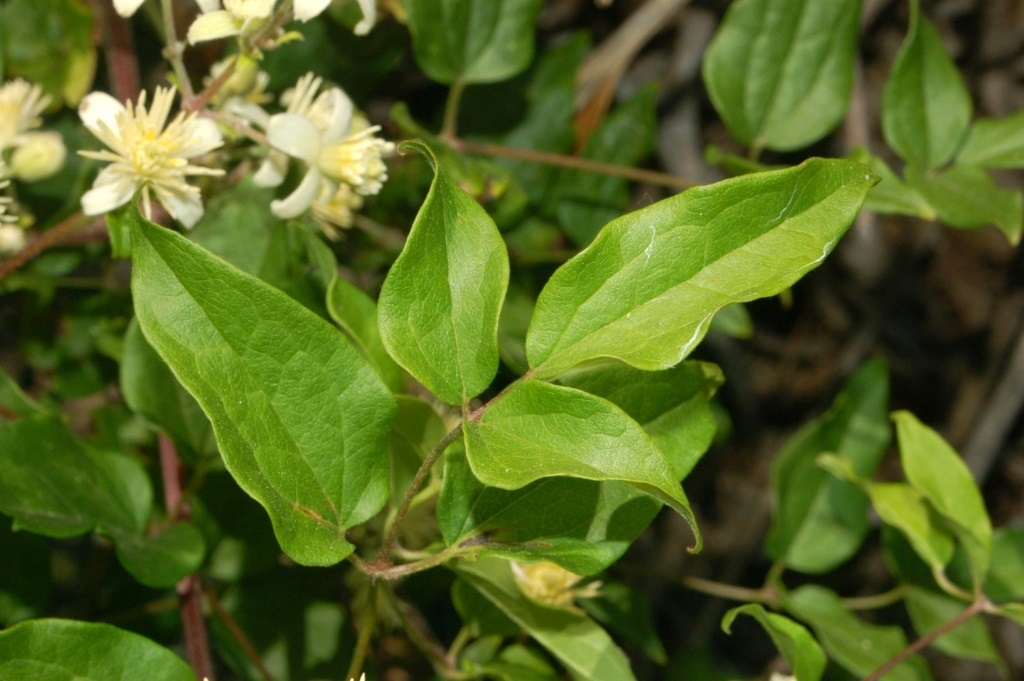
Leaves

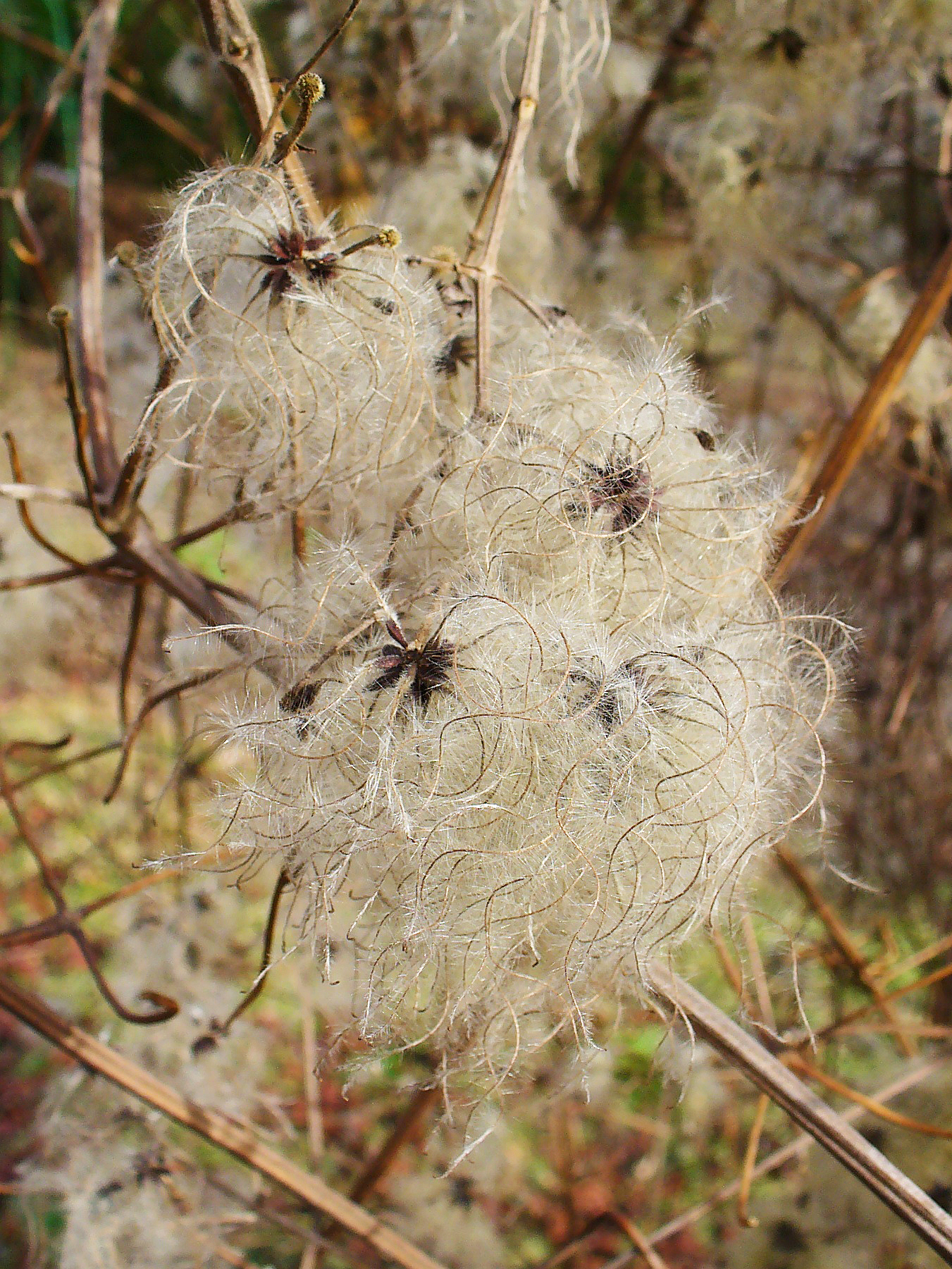
Fruits
