= List of Lepidoptera of Cyprus =

Location of Cyprus

Lepidoptera of Cyprus consist of both the butterflies and moths recorded from Cyprus.

== Butterflies ==
=== Hesperiidae ===
- Carcharodus alceae (Esper, 1780)
- Gegenes pumilio (Hoffmannsegg, 1804)
- Pelopidas thrax (Hübner, 1821)
- Thymelicus acteon (Rottemburg, 1775)

=== Lycaenidae ===
- Aricia agestis (Denis & Schiffermuller, 1775)
- Azanus jesous (Guerin-Meneville, 1847)
- Celastrina argiolus (Linnaeus, 1758)
- Cigaritis acamas (Klug, 1834)
- Favonius quercus (Linnaeus, 1758)
- Freyeria trochylus (Freyer, 1845)
- Glaucopsyche paphos Chapman, 1920
- Lampides boeticus (Linnaeus, 1767)
- Leptotes pirithous (Linnaeus, 1767)
- Luthrodes galba (Lederer, 1855)
- Lycaena phlaeas (Linnaeus, 1761)
- Lycaena thersamon (Esper, 1784)
- Polyommatus icarus (Rottemburg, 1775)
- Pseudophilotes vicrama (Moore, 1865)
- Tarucus balkanica (Freyer, 1844)
- Zizeeria karsandra (Moore, 1865)

=== Nymphalidae ===
- Argynnis pandora (Denis & Schiffermuller, 1775)
- Charaxes jasius (Linnaeus, 1767)
- Chazara briseis (Linnaeus, 1764)
- Danaus chrysippus (Linnaeus, 1758)
- Hipparchia syriaca (Staudinger, 1871)
- Hipparchia cypriensis Holik, 1949
- Hyponephele lupinus (O. Costa, 1836)
- Kirinia roxelana (Cramer, 1777)
- Lasiommata maera (Linnaeus, 1758)
- Lasiommata megera (Linnaeus, 1767)
- Libythea celtis (Laicharting, 1782)
- Limenitis reducta Staudinger, 1901
- Maniola cypricola (Graves, 1928)
- Nymphalis polychloros (Linnaeus, 1758)
- Pararge aegeria (Linnaeus, 1758)
- Pseudochazara anthelea (Hübner, 1824)
- Vanessa atalanta (Linnaeus, 1758)
- Vanessa cardui (Linnaeus, 1758)
- Ypthima asterope (Klug, 1832)

=== Papilionidae ===
- Papilio machaon Linnaeus, 1758
- Zerynthia cerisy (Godart, 1824)

=== Pieridae ===
- Anthocharis cardamines (Linnaeus, 1758)
- Aporia crataegi (Linnaeus, 1758)
- Colias croceus (Fourcroy, 1785)
- Euchloe ausonia (Hübner, 1804)
- Gonepteryx cleopatra (Linnaeus, 1767)
- Pieris brassicae (Linnaeus, 1758)
- Pieris rapae (Linnaeus, 1758)
- Pontia chloridice (Hübner, 1813)

== Moths ==
=== Adelidae ===
- Adela paludicolella Zeller, 1850
- Nemophora minimella (Denis & Schiffermuller, 1775)

=== Alucitidae ===
- Alucita klimeschi Scholz & Jackh, 1997

=== Autostichidae ===
- Apatema acutivalva Gozmany, 2000
- Apatema apatemella Amsel, 1958
- Apatema mediopallidum Walsingham, 1900
- Apiletria luella Lederer, 1855
- Charadraula cassandra Gozmany, 1967
- Orpecacantha aphrodite (Gozmany, 1986)
- Symmoca vitiosella Zeller, 1868
- Syringopais temperatella (Lederer, 1855)

=== Blastobasidae ===
- Blastobasis phycidella (Zeller, 1839)
- Tecmerium perplexum (Gozmany, 1957)

=== Carposinidae ===
- Carposina berberidella Herrich-Schäffer, 1854
- Carposina scirrhosella Herrich-Schäffer, 1854

=== Choreutidae ===
- Anthophila fabriciana (Linnaeus, 1767)
- Choreutis nemorana (Hübner, 1799)

=== Coleophoridae ===
- Coleophora alashiae Baldizzone, 1996
- Coleophora albicostella (Duponchel, 1842)
- Coleophora arenbergerella Baldizzone, 1985
- Coleophora bilineella Herrich-Schäffer, 1855
- Coleophora granulosella Staudinger, 1880
- Coleophora helianthemella Milliere, 1870
- Coleophora jerusalemella Toll, 1942
- Coleophora lassella Staudinger, 1859
- Coleophora luteolella Staudinger, 1880
- Coleophora maritimella Newman, 1863
- Coleophora mausolella Chretien, 1908
- Coleophora ononidella Milliere, 1879
- Coleophora parthenica Meyrick, 1891
- Coleophora salicorniae Heinemann & Wocke, 1877
- Coleophora salinella Stainton, 1859
- Coleophora semicinerea Staudinger, 1859
- Coleophora tamesis Waters, 1929
- Coleophora valesianella Zeller, 1849
- Coleophora zernyi Toll, 1944
- Goniodoma limoniella (Stainton, 1884)

=== Cosmopterigidae ===
- Alloclita recisella Staudinger, 1859
- Anatrachyntis simplex (Walsingham, 1891)
- Ascalenia vanelloides Gerasimov, 1930
- Cosmopterix coryphaea Walsingham, 1908
- Cosmopterix pararufella Riedl, 1976
- Eteobalea dohrnii (Zeller, 1847)
- Eteobalea intermediella (Riedl, 1966)
- Eteobalea sumptuosella (Lederer, 1855)
- Pyroderces argyrogrammos (Zeller, 1847)
- Ramphis libanoticus Riedl, 1969
- Sorhagenia reconditella Riedl, 1983

=== Cossidae ===
- Dyspessa ulula (Borkhausen, 1790)
- Paropta l-nigrum (Bethune-Baker, 1894)
- Paropta paradoxus (Herrich-Schäffer, [1851])
- Zeuzera pyrina (Linnaeus, 1761)

=== Crambidae ===
- Anarpia incertalis (Duponchel, 1832)
- Ancylolomia chrysographellus (Kollar & Redtenbacher, 1844)
- Eudonia delunella (Stainton, 1849)
- Herpetogramma licarsisalis (Walker, 1859)
- Metasia albicostalis Hampson, 1900
- Metasia parvalis Caradja, 1916
- Metasia rosealis Ragonot, 1895
- Prionapteryx obeliscota (Meyrick, 1936)
- Prochoristis crudalis (Lederer, 1863)
- Scoparia berytella Rebel, 1911
- Scoparia ingratella (Zeller, 1846)
- Scoparia staudingeralis (Mabille, 1869)

=== Douglasiidae ===
- Tinagma anchusella (Benander, 1936)
- Tinagma klimeschi Gaedike, 1987

=== Elachistidae ===
- Agonopterix cachritis (Staudinger, 1859)
- Agonopterix ferulae (Zeller, 1847)
- Agonopterix nodiflorella (Milliere, 1866)
- Agonopterix rutana (Fabricius, 1794)
- Agonopterix scopariella (Heinemann, 1870)
- Depressaria daucivorella Ragonot, 1889
- Depressaria depressana (Fabricius, 1775)
- Elachista sutteri Kaila, 2002
- Elachista pigerella (Herrich-Schäffer, 1854)
- Ethmia bipunctella (Fabricius, 1775)
- Exaeretia ledereri (Zeller, 1854)

=== Erebidae ===
- Autophila asiatica (Staudinger, 1888)
- Autophila dilucida (Hübner, 1808)
- Autophila luxuriosa Zerny, 1933
- Autophila anaphanes Boursin, 1940
- Autophila maura (Staudinger, 1888)
- Catephia alchymista (Denis & Schiffermuller, 1775)
- Catocala coniuncta (Esper, 1787)
- Catocala conversa (Esper, 1783)
- Catocala dilecta (Hübner, 1808)
- Catocala disjuncta (Geyer, 1828)
- Catocala diversa (Geyer, 1828)
- Catocala elocata (Esper, 1787)
- Catocala eutychea Treitschke, 1835
- Catocala nymphaea (Esper, 1787)
- Catocala nymphagoga (Esper, 1787)
- Catocala promissa (Denis & Schiffermuller, 1775)
- Catocala separata Freyer, 1848
- Clytie syriaca (Bugnion, 1837)
- Coscinia cribraria (Linnaeus, 1758)
- Coscinia striata (Linnaeus, 1758)
- Drasteria cailino (Lefebvre, 1827)
- Dysauxes famula (Freyer, 1836)
- Dysgonia algira (Linnaeus, 1767)
- Dysgonia torrida (Guenee, 1852)
- Eilema complana (Linnaeus, 1758)
- Eilema muscula (Staudinger, 1899)
- Eublemma candidana (Fabricius, 1794)
- Eublemma cochylioides (Guenee, 1852)
- Eublemma gratissima (Staudinger, 1892)
- Eublemma ostrina (Hübner, 1808)
- Eublemma pallidula (Herrich-Schäffer, 1856)
- Eublemma parva (Hübner, 1808)
- Eublemma polygramma (Duponchel, 1842)
- Eublemma scitula Rambur, 1833
- Eublemma straminea (Staudinger, 1892)
- Eublemma suppura (Staudinger, 1892)
- Euplagia quadripunctaria (Poda, 1761)
- Euproctis chrysorrhoea (Linnaeus, 1758)
- Grammodes bifasciata (Petagna, 1787)
- Grammodes stolida (Fabricius, 1775)
- Heteropalpia vetusta (Walker, 1865)
- Hypena lividalis (Hübner, 1796)
- Hypena obsitalis (Hübner, 1813)
- Hypenodes cypriaca Fibiger, Pekarsky & Ronkay, 2010
- Lygephila craccae (Denis & Schiffermuller, 1775)
- Lymantria atlantica (Rambur, 1837)
- Metachrostis dardouini (Boisduval, 1840)
- Metachrostis velocior (Staudinger, 1892)
- Metachrostis velox (Hübner, 1813)
- Micronoctua karsholti Fibiger, 1997
- Minucia lunaris (Denis & Schiffermuller, 1775)
- Ocnogyna loewii (Zeller, 1846)
- Ophiusa tirhaca (Cramer, 1773)
- Orectis proboscidata (Herrich-Schäffer, 1851)
- Orgyia josephina Astaut, 1880
- Orgyia trigotephras Boisduval, 1829
- Pandesma robusta (Walker, 1858)
- Parascotia detersa (Staudinger, 1891)
- Parascotia fuliginaria (Linnaeus, 1761)
- Parocneria terebinthi (Freyer, 1838)
- Pericyma albidentaria (Freyer, 1842)
- Pericyma squalens Lederer, 1855
- Raparna conicephala (Staudinger, 1870)
- Rhypagla lacernaria (Hübner, 1813)
- Tathorhynchus exsiccata (Lederer, 1855)
- Utetheisa pulchella (Linnaeus, 1758)
- Zanclognatha lunalis (Scopoli, 1763)
- Zanclognatha zelleralis (Wocke, 1850)
- Zebeeba falsalis (Herrich-Schäffer, 1839)
- Zekelita ravalis (Herrich-Schäffer, 1851)
- Zekelita antiqualis (Hübner, 1809)
- Zethes insularis Rambur, 1833

=== Eriocottidae ===
- Deuterotinea instabilis (Meyrick, 1924)

=== Euteliidae ===
- Eutelia adulatrix (Hübner, 1813)

=== Gelechiidae ===
- Altenia mersinella (Staudinger, 1879)
- Altenia wagneriella (Rebel, 1926)
- Anacampsis obscurella (Denis & Schiffermuller, 1775)
- Anacampsis timidella (Wocke, 1887)
- Anarsia lineatella Zeller, 1839
- Aristotelia calastomella (Christoph, 1873)
- Aristotelia decurtella (Hübner, 1813)
- Bryotropha arabica Amsel, 1952
- Bryotropha azovica Bidzilia, 1997
- Bryotropha desertella (Douglas, 1850)
- Bryotropha domestica (Haworth, 1828)
- Bryotropha figulella (Staudinger, 1859)
- Bryotropha hendrikseni Karsholt & Rutten, 2005
- Bryotropha hulli Karsholt & Rutten, 2005
- Bryotropha plebejella (Zeller, 1847)
- Bryotropha sabulosella (Rebel, 1905)
- Bryotropha senectella (Zeller, 1839)
- Carpatolechia decorella (Haworth, 1812)
- Caryocolum marmorea (Haworth, 1828)
- Crossobela trinotella (Herrich-Schäffer, 1856)
- Deltophora maculata (Staudinger, 1879)
- Dichomeris acuminatus (Staudinger, 1876)
- Dichomeris lamprostoma (Zeller, 1847)
- Dichomeris limbipunctellus (Staudinger, 1859)
- Ephysteris deserticolella (Staudinger, 1871)
- Ephysteris promptella (Staudinger, 1859)
- Ephysteris tenuisaccus Nupponen, 2010
- Epidola stigma Staudinger, 1859
- Eulamprotes isostacta (Meyrick, 1926)
- Eulamprotes nigromaculella (Milliere, 1872)
- Exoteleia dodecella (Linnaeus, 1758)
- Gelechia senticetella (Staudinger, 1859)
- Isophrictis anthemidella (Wocke, 1871)
- Istrianis femoralis (Staudinger, 1876)
- Mesophleps corsicella Herrich-Schäffer, 1856
- Mesophleps oxycedrella (Milliere, 1871)
- Mesophleps silacella (Hübner, 1796)
- Metanarsia modesta Staudinger, 1871
- Metzneria aestivella (Zeller, 1839)
- Metzneria agraphella (Ragonot, 1895)
- Metzneria campicolella (Mann, 1857)
- Metzneria castiliella (Moschler, 1866)
- Metzneria lappella (Linnaeus, 1758)
- Metzneria littorella (Douglas, 1850)
- Metzneria riadella Englert, 1974
- Metzneria torosulella (Rebel, 1893)
- Microlechia rhamnifoliae (Amsel & Hering, 1931)
- Mirificarma eburnella (Denis & Schiffermuller, 1775)
- Mirificarma flavella (Duponchel, 1844)
- Mirificarma mulinella (Zeller, 1839)
- Monochroa melagonella (Constant, 1895)
- Neotelphusa cisti (Stainton, 1869)
- Nothris verbascella (Denis & Schiffermuller, 1775)
- Ochrodia subdiminutella (Stainton, 1867)
- Oecocecis guyonella Guenee, 1870
- Ornativalva heluanensis (Debski, 1913)
- Ornativalva plutelliformis (Staudinger, 1859)
- Palumbina guerinii (Stainton, 1858)
- Parapodia sinaica (Frauenfeld, 1859)
- Pectinophora gossypiella (Saunders, 1844)
- Phthorimaea operculella (Zeller, 1873)
- Platyedra subcinerea (Haworth, 1828)
- Ptocheuusa minimella (Rebel, 1936)
- Ptocheuusa paupella (Zeller, 1847)
- Recurvaria nanella (Denis & Schiffermuller, 1775)
- Schneidereria pistaciella Weber, 1957
- Scrobipalpa aptatella (Walker, 1864)
- Scrobipalpa bigoti Povolny, 1973
- Scrobipalpa instabilella (Douglas, 1846)
- Scrobipalpa ocellatella (Boyd, 1858)
- Scrobipalpa suaedella (Richardson, 1893)
- Scrobipalpa wiltshirei Povolny, 1966
- Sitotroga cerealella (Olivier, 1789)
- Stomopteryx basalis (Staudinger, 1876)
- Stomopteryx remissella (Zeller, 1847)

=== Geometridae ===
- Agriopis bajaria (Denis & Schiffermuller, 1775)
- Aplasta ononaria (Fuessly, 1783)
- Aplocera plagiata (Linnaeus, 1758)
- Apochima flabellaria (Heeger, 1838)
- Ascotis selenaria (Denis & Schiffermuller, 1775)
- Aspitates ochrearia (Rossi, 1794)
- Camptogramma bilineata (Linnaeus, 1758)
- Casilda consecraria (Staudinger, 1871)
- Catarhoe hortulanaria (Staudinger, 1879)
- Catarhoe permixtaria (Herrich-Schäffer, 1856)
- Charissa subtaurica (Wehrli, 1932)
- Chesias rhegmatica Prout, 1937
- Chiasmia aestimaria (Hübner, 1809)
- Chiasmia syriacaria (Staudinger, 1871)
- Coenotephria ablutaria (Boisduval, 1840)
- Colotois pennaria (Linnaeus, 1761)
- Crocallis cypriaca Fischer, 2003
- Culpinia prouti (Thierry-Mieg, 1913)
- Cyclophora puppillaria (Hübner, 1799)
- Dasycorsa modesta (Staudinger, 1879)
- Dyscia innocentaria (Christoph, 1885)
- Dyscia simplicaria Rebel, 1933
- Ennomos lissochila (Prout, 1929)
- Epirrhoe galiata (Denis & Schiffermuller, 1775)
- Eumannia arenbergeri Hausmann, 1995
- Eumera mulier Prout, 1929
- Eupithecia breviculata (Donzel, 1837)
- Eupithecia centaureata (Denis & Schiffermuller, 1775)
- Eupithecia cerussaria (Lederer, 1855)
- Eupithecia dubiosa Dietze, 1910
- Eupithecia ericeata (Rambur, 1833)
- Eupithecia marginata Staudinger, 1892
- Eupithecia quercetica Prout, 1938
- Eupithecia reisserata Pinker, 1976
- Gnopharmia stevenaria (Boisduval, 1840)
- Gnophos sartata Treitschke, 1827
- Gymnoscelis rufifasciata (Haworth, 1809)
- Hypomecis punctinalis (Scopoli, 1763)
- Idaea albitorquata (Pungeler, 1909)
- Idaea camparia (Herrich-Schäffer, 1852)
- Idaea completa (Staudinger, 1892)
- Idaea consanguinaria (Lederer, 1853)
- Idaea consolidata (Lederer, 1853)
- Idaea degeneraria (Hübner, 1799)
- Idaea dimidiata (Hufnagel, 1767)
- Idaea distinctaria (Boisduval, 1840)
- Idaea elongaria (Rambur, 1833)
- Idaea filicata (Hübner, 1799)
- Idaea inclinata (Lederer, 1855)
- Idaea inquinata (Scopoli, 1763)
- Idaea intermedia (Staudinger, 1879)
- Idaea mimosaria (Guenee, 1858)
- Idaea obsoletaria (Rambur, 1833)
- Idaea ochrata (Scopoli, 1763)
- Idaea ostrinaria (Hübner, 1813)
- Idaea palaestinensis (Sterneck, 1933)
- Idaea peluraria (Reisser, 1939)
- Idaea politaria (Hübner, 1799)
- Idaea seriata (Schrank, 1802)
- Idaea subsericeata (Haworth, 1809)
- Idaea textaria (Lederer, 1861)
- Idaea tineata (Thierry-Mieg, 1911)
- Idaea trigeminata (Haworth, 1809)
- Idaea troglodytaria (Heydenreich, 1851)
- Isturgia berytaria (Staudinger, 1892)
- Larentia clavaria (Haworth, 1809)
- Mattia adlata (Staudinger, 1895)
- Menophra berenicidaria (Turati, 1924)
- Microloxia herbaria (Hübner, 1813)
- Nebula achromaria (de La Harpe, 1853)
- Nebula schneideraria (Lederer, 1855)
- Nychiodes aphrodite Hausmann & Wimmer, 1994
- Nycterosea obstipata (Fabricius, 1794)
- Orthostixis cinerea Rebel, 1916
- Oulobophora externaria (Herrich-Schäffer, 1848)
- Pareulype lasithiotica (Rebel, 1906)
- Peribatodes correptaria (Zeller, 1847)
- Peribatodes rhomboidaria (Denis & Schiffermuller, 1775)
- Peribatodes umbraria (Hübner, 1809)
- Perizoma bifaciata (Haworth, 1809)
- Phaiogramma etruscaria (Zeller, 1849)
- Phaiogramma faustinata (Milliere, 1868)
- Problepsis ocellata (Frivaldszky, 1845)
- Proteuchloris neriaria (Herrich-Schäffer, 1852)
- Protorhoe corollaria (Herrich-Schäffer, 1848)
- Protorhoe unicata (Guenee, 1858)
- Pseudoterpna coronillaria (Hübner, 1817)
- Pseudoterpna rectistrigaria Wiltshire, 1948
- Rhodometra sacraria (Linnaeus, 1767)
- Rhodostrophia tabidaria (Zeller, 1847)
- Rhoptria asperaria (Hübner, 1817)
- Scopula decolor (Staudinger, 1898)
- Scopula flaccidaria (Zeller, 1852)
- Scopula imitaria (Hübner, 1799)
- Scopula luridata (Zeller, 1847)
- Scopula marginepunctata (Goeze, 1781)
- Scopula minorata (Boisduval, 1833)
- Scopula sacraria (Bang-Haas, 1910)
- Scopula uberaria Zerny, 1933
- Scopula ornata (Scopoli, 1763)
- Scopula submutata (Treitschke, 1828)
- Scopula turbulentaria (Staudinger, 1870)
- Scopula vigilata (Sohn-Rethel, 1929)
- Selidosema tamsi Rebel, 1939
- Xanthorhoe fluctuata (Linnaeus, 1758)
- Xanthorhoe oxybiata (Milliere, 1872)
- Xenochlorodes olympiaria (Herrich-Schäffer, 1852)

=== Glyphipterigidae ===
- Digitivalva pulicariae (Klimesch, 1956)

=== Gracillariidae ===
- Caloptilia falconipennella (Hübner, 1813)
- Caloptilia roscipennella (Hübner, 1796)
- Parornix acuta Triberti, 1980
- Phyllonorycter blancardella (Fabricius, 1781)
- Phyllonorycter helianthemella (Herrich-Schäffer, 1861)
- Phyllonorycter obtusifoliella Deschka, 1974
- Phyllonorycter platani (Staudinger, 1870)
- Phyllonorycter roboris (Zeller, 1839)
- Phyllonorycter troodi Deschka, 1974
- Polymitia eximipalpella (Gerasimov, 1930)
- Stomphastis conflua (Meyrick, 1914)

=== Lasiocampidae ===
- Chondrostega pastrana Lederer, 1858
- Lasiocampa terreni (Herrich-Schäffer, 1847)

=== Limacodidae ===
- Hoyosia cretica (Rebel, 1906)

=== Micropterigidae ===
- Micropterix cypriensis Heath, 1985

=== Momphidae ===
- Mompha miscella (Denis & Schiffermuller, 1775)

=== Nepticulidae ===
- Acalyptris pistaciae van Nieukerken, 2007
- Acalyptris platani (Muller-Rutz, 1934)
- Ectoedemia alnifoliae van Nieukerken, 1985
- Ectoedemia erythrogenella (de Joannis, 1908)
- Ectoedemia heringella (Mariani, 1939)
- Ectoedemia vivesi A.Lastuvka, Z. Lastuvka & van Nieukerken, 2010
- Simplimorpha promissa (Staudinger, 1871)
- Stigmella auromarginella (Richardson, 1890)
- Stigmella azaroli (Klimesch, 1978)
- Stigmella pyrellicola (Klimesch, 1978)
- Stigmella pyrivora Gustafsson, 1981
- Stigmella rhamnophila (Amsel, 1934)
- Trifurcula rosmarinella (Chretien, 1914)

=== Noctuidae ===
- Acontia lucida (Hufnagel, 1766)
- Acontia trabealis (Scopoli, 1763)
- Acrapex taurica (Staudinger, 1900)
- Acronicta aceris (Linnaeus, 1758)
- Acronicta tridens (Denis & Schiffermuller, 1775)
- Acronicta rumicis (Linnaeus, 1758)
- Aedia leucomelas (Linnaeus, 1758)
- Aegle semicana (Esper, 1798)
- Agrochola lychnidis (Denis & Schiffermuller, 1775)
- Agrochola orientalis Fibiger, 1997
- Agrotis bigramma (Esper, 1790)
- Agrotis catalaunensis (Milliere, 1873)
- Agrotis herzogi Rebel, 1911
- Agrotis ipsilon (Hufnagel, 1766)
- Agrotis lasserrei (Oberthur, 1881)
- Agrotis puta (Hübner, 1803)
- Agrotis segetum (Denis & Schiffermuller, 1775)
- Agrotis spinifera (Hübner, 1808)
- Agrotis trux (Hübner, 1824)
- Allophyes asiatica (Staudinger, 1892)
- Amephana dalmatica (Rebel, 1919)
- Ammoconia aholai Fibiger, 1996
- Amphipyra effusa Boisduval, 1828
- Amphipyra micans Lederer, 1857
- Amphipyra tragopoginis (Clerck, 1759)
- Anarta dianthi (Tauscher, 1809)
- Anarta trifolii (Hufnagel, 1766)
- Anthracia eriopoda (Herrich-Schäffer, 1851)
- Apamea monoglypha (Hufnagel, 1766)
- Apamea sicula (Turati, 1909)
- Aporophyla australis (Boisduval, 1829)
- Aporophyla nigra (Haworth, 1809)
- Atethmia ambusta (Denis & Schiffermuller, 1775)
- Atethmia centrago (Haworth, 1809)
- Autographa gamma (Linnaeus, 1758)
- Bryophila gea (Schawerda, 1934)
- Bryophila microphysa (Boursin, 1952)
- Bryophila raptricula (Denis & Schiffermuller, 1775)
- Bryophila rectilinea (Warren, 1909)
- Bryophila tephrocharis (Boursin, 1953)
- Bryophila petrea Guenee, 1852
- Bryophila maeonis Lederer, 1865
- Callopistria latreillei (Duponchel, 1827)
- Caradrina syriaca Staudinger, 1892
- Caradrina atriluna Guenee, 1852
- Caradrina clavipalpis Scopoli, 1763
- Caradrina flavirena Guenee, 1852
- Caradrina zandi Wiltshire, 1952
- Caradrina aspersa Rambur, 1834
- Caradrina kadenii Freyer, 1836
- Cardepia affinis (Rothschild, 1913)
- Chloantha hyperici (Denis & Schiffermuller, 1775)
- Chrysodeixis chalcites (Esper, 1789)
- Condica viscosa (Freyer, 1831)
- Conistra rubricans Fibiger, 1987
- Cornutiplusia circumflexa (Linnaeus, 1767)
- Craniophora ligustri (Denis & Schiffermuller, 1775)
- Cryphia receptricula (Hübner, 1803)
- Cryphia algae (Fabricius, 1775)
- Cryphia ochsi (Boursin, 1940)
- Ctenoplusia accentifera (Lefebvre, 1827)
- Cucullia celsiae Herrich-Schäffer, 1850
- Cucullia calendulae Treitschke, 1835
- Cucullia syrtana Mabille, 1888
- Cucullia barthae Boursin, 1933
- Cucullia lanceolata (Villers, 1789)
- Deltote pygarga (Hufnagel, 1766)
- Dichagyris flammatra (Denis & Schiffermuller, 1775)
- Dichagyris adelfi Fibiger, Nilsson & Svendsen, 1999
- Dichagyris endemica Fibiger, Svendsen & Nilsson, 1999
- Dichagyris squalorum (Eversmann, 1856)
- Divaena haywardi (Tams, 1926)
- Dryobota labecula (Esper, 1788)
- Dryobotodes servadeii Parenzan, 1982
- Egira anatolica (M. Hering, 1933)
- Epilecta linogrisea (Denis & Schiffermuller, 1775)
- Episema korsakovi (Christoph, 1885)
- Episema kourion Nilsson, Svendsen & Fibiger, 1999
- Eremohadena chenopodiphaga (Rambur, 1832)
- Euxoa conspicua (Hübner, 1824)
- Euxoa cos (Hübner, 1824)
- Euxoa hemispherica Hampson, 1903
- Hadena perplexa (Denis & Schiffermuller, 1775)
- Hadena sancta (Staudinger, 1859)
- Hadena syriaca (Osthelder, 1933)
- Hadena adriana (Schawerda, 1921)
- Hadena silenides (Staudinger, 1895)
- Hecatera bicolorata (Hufnagel, 1766)
- Hecatera cappa (Hübner, 1809)
- Hecatera dysodea (Denis & Schiffermuller, 1775)
- Helicoverpa armigera (Hübner, 1808)
- Heliothis nubigera Herrich-Schäffer, 1851
- Heliothis peltigera (Denis & Schiffermuller, 1775)
- Hoplodrina ambigua (Denis & Schiffermuller, 1775)
- Lenisa geminipuncta (Haworth, 1809)
- Lenisa wiltshirei (Bytinski-Salz, 1936)
- Leucania loreyi (Duponchel, 1827)
- Leucania herrichi Herrich-Schäffer, 1849
- Leucania palaestinae Staudinger, 1897
- Leucania punctosa (Treitschke, 1825)
- Leucania putrescens (Hübner, 1824)
- Leucochlaena muscosa (Staudinger, 1892)
- Lithophane ledereri (Staudinger, 1892)
- Lithophane merckii (Rambur, 1832)
- Lithophane lapidea (Hübner, 1808)
- Luperina diversa (Staudinger, 1892)
- Luperina dumerilii (Duponchel, 1826)
- Mamestra brassicae (Linnaeus, 1758)
- Melanchra persicariae (Linnaeus, 1761)
- Mesapamea secalis (Linnaeus, 1758)
- Metopoceras omar (Oberthur, 1887)
- Mormo maura (Linnaeus, 1758)
- Mythimna congrua (Hübner, 1817)
- Mythimna ferrago (Fabricius, 1787)
- Mythimna l-album (Linnaeus, 1767)
- Mythimna languida (Walker, 1858)
- Mythimna vitellina (Hübner, 1808)
- Mythimna unipuncta (Haworth, 1809)
- Mythimna alopecuri (Boisduval, 1840)
- Mythimna sicula (Treitschke, 1835)
- Noctua orbona (Hufnagel, 1766)
- Noctua pronuba (Linnaeus, 1758)
- Noctua tertia Mentzer & al., 1991
- Noctua warreni Lodl, 1987
- Nyctobrya amasina Draudt, 1931
- Ochropleura leucogaster (Freyer, 1831)
- Olivenebula subsericata (Herrich-Schäffer, 1861)
- Oncocnemis arenbergi Hacker & Lodl, 1989
- Orthosia cruda (Denis & Schiffermuller, 1775)
- Orthosia cypriaca Hacker, 1996
- Orthosia incerta (Hufnagel, 1766)
- Peridroma saucia (Hübner, 1808)
- Perigrapha wimmeri Hacker, 1996
- Polymixis alaschia Hacker, 1996
- Polymixis aphrodite Fibiger, 1987
- Polymixis trisignata (Menetries, 1847)
- Polymixis ancepsoides Poole, 1989
- Polymixis manisadijani (Staudinger, 1881)
- Polymixis rufocincta (Geyer, 1828)
- Polymixis iatnana Hacker, 1996
- Pseudenargia troodosi Svendsen, Nilsson & Fibiger, 1999
- Rhyacia arenacea (Hampson, 1907)
- Sesamia cretica Lederer, 1857
- Sesamia nonagrioides Lefebvre, 1827
- Spodoptera cilium Guenee, 1852
- Spodoptera exigua (Hübner, 1808)
- Spodoptera littoralis (Boisduval, 1833)
- Standfussiana lucernea (Linnaeus, 1758)
- Standfussiana nictymera (Boisduval, 1834)
- Subacronicta megacephala (Denis & Schiffermuller, 1775)
- Thysanoplusia circumscripta (Freyer, 1831)
- Thysanoplusia daubei (Boisduval, 1840)
- Thysanoplusia orichalcea (Fabricius, 1775)
- Tiliacea cypreago (Hampson, 1906)
- Trichoplusia ni (Hübner, 1803)
- Trigonophora flammea (Esper, 1785)
- Tyta luctuosa (Denis & Schiffermuller, 1775)
- Xestia c-nigrum (Linnaeus, 1758)
- Xestia cohaesa (Herrich-Schäffer, 1849)
- Xestia palaestinensis (Kalchberg, 1897)
- Xestia xanthographa (Denis & Schiffermuller, 1775)
- Xylena exsoleta (Linnaeus, 1758)
- Xylena vetusta (Hübner, 1813)

=== Nolidae ===
- Earias clorana (Linnaeus, 1761)
- Earias insulana (Boisduval, 1833)
- Meganola togatulalis (Hübner, 1796)
- Nola aegyptiaca Snellen, 1875
- Nola chlamitulalis (Hübner, 1813)
- Nycteola columbana (Turner, 1925)
- Nycteola revayana (Scopoli, 1772)

=== Notodontidae ===
- Furcula interrupta (Christoph, 1867)
- Harpyia milhauseri (Fabricius, 1775)
- Phalera bucephaloides (Ochsenheimer, 1810)
- Thaumetopoea processionea (Linnaeus, 1758)
- Thaumetopoea solitaria (Freyer, 1838)
- Thaumetopoea wilkinsoni Tams, 1926

=== Oecophoridae ===
- Crossotocera wagnerella Zerny, 1930
- Denisia augustella (Hübner, 1796)
- Epicallima formosella (Denis & Schiffermuller, 1775)
- Epicallima icterinella (Mann, 1867)
- Pleurota pyropella (Denis & Schiffermuller, 1775)
- Schiffermuelleria schaefferella (Linnaeus, 1758)

=== Peleopodidae ===
- Carcina quercana (Fabricius, 1775)

=== Plutellidae ===
- Plutella xylostella (Linnaeus, 1758)

=== Praydidae ===
- Prays oleae (Bernard, 1788)

=== Psychidae ===
- Apterona helicoidella (Vallot, 1827)
- Eumasia parietariella (Heydenreich, 1851)
- Pachythelia villosella (Ochsenheimer, 1810)
- Pseudobankesia aphroditae Weidlich, M., Henderickx, H., 2002

=== Pterophoridae ===
- Agdistis cypriota Arenberger, 1983
- Agdistis frankeniae (Zeller, 1847)
- Agdistis heydeni (Zeller, 1852)
- Agdistis meridionalis (Zeller, 1847)
- Agdistis nigra Amsel, 1955
- Agdistis protai Arenberger, 1973
- Agdistis tamaricis (Zeller, 1847)
- Amblyptilia acanthadactyla (Hübner, 1813)
- Capperia celeusi (Frey, 1886)
- Capperia maratonica Adamczewski, 1951
- Capperia marginellus (Zeller, 1847)
- Cnaemidophorus rhododactyla (Denis & Schiffermuller, 1775)
- Crombrugghia distans (Zeller, 1847)
- Crombrugghia reichli Arenberger, 1998
- Emmelina monodactyla (Linnaeus, 1758)
- Hellinsia inulae (Zeller, 1852)
- Hellinsia pectodactylus (Staudinger, 1859)
- Merrifieldia malacodactylus (Zeller, 1847)
- Puerphorus olbiadactylus (Milliere, 1859)
- Stangeia siceliota (Zeller, 1847)
- Stenoptilia bipunctidactyla (Scopoli, 1763)
- Stenoptilia elkefi Arenberger, 1984
- Stenoptilia lucasi Arenberger, 1990
- Stenoptilia zophodactylus (Duponchel, 1840)
- Stenoptilodes taprobanes (Felder & Rogenhofer, 1875)
- Tabulaephorus punctinervis (Constant, 1885)
- Wheeleria ivae (Kasy, 1960)
- Wheeleria obsoletus (Zeller, 1841)

=== Pyralidae ===
- Acrobasis getuliella (Zerny, 1914)
- Aglossa asiatica Erschoff, 1872
- Aglossa exsucealis Lederer, 1863
- Ancylosis biflexella (Lederer, 1855)
- Ancylosis convexella (Lederer, 1855)
- Ancylosis monella (Roesler, 1973)
- Ancylosis rhodochrella (Herrich-Schäffer, 1852)
- Ancylosis yerburii (Butler, 1884)
- Cadra cautella (Walker, 1863)
- Cadra figulilella (Gregson, 1871)
- Dioryctria mendacella (Staudinger, 1859)
- Ephestia elutella (Hübner, 1796)
- Ephestia kuehniella Zeller, 1879
- Epicrocis anthracanthes Meyrick, 1934
- Eurhodope cinerea (Staudinger, 1879)
- Euzophera cinerosella (Zeller, 1839)
- Euzophera osseatella (Treitschke, 1832)
- Euzophera paghmanicola Roesler, 1973
- Euzophera umbrosella (Staudinger, 1879)
- Faveria sordida (Staudinger, 1879)
- Homoeosoma candefactella Ragonot, 1887
- Homoeosoma sinuella (Fabricius, 1794)
- Hypotia mavromoustakisi (Rebel, 1928)
- Hypsopygia almanalis (Rebel, 1917)
- Keradere noctivaga (Staudinger, 1879)
- Lamoria melanophlebia Ragonot, 1888
- Metallostichodes nigrocyanella (Constant, 1865)
- Myelois ossicolor Ragonot, 1893
- Pempelia albicostella Amsel, 1958
- Pempelia cirtensis (Ragonot, 1890)
- Phycitodes albatella (Ragonot, 1887)
- Phycitodes binaevella (Hübner, 1813)
- Phycitodes inquinatella (Ragonot, 1887)
- Phycitodes saxicola (Vaughan, 1870)
- Pyralis kacheticalis (Christoph, 1893)
- Scotomera caesarealis (Ragonot, 1891)

=== Saturniidae ===
- Saturnia caecigena Kupido, 1825

=== Scythrididae ===
- Scythris punctivittella (O. Costa, 1836)

=== Sesiidae ===
- Bembecia albanensis (Rebel, 1918)
- Bembecia stiziformis (Herrich-Schäffer, 1851)
- Chamaesphecia alysoniformis (Herrich-Schäffer, 1846)
- Chamaesphecia masariformis (Ochsenheimer, 1808)
- Chamaesphecia minor (Staudinger, 1856)
- Chamaesphecia proximata (Staudinger, 1891)
- Paranthrene tabaniformis (Rottemburg, 1775)
- Pyropteron affinis (Staudinger, 1856)
- Pyropteron leucomelaena (Zeller, 1847)
- Pyropteron minianiformis (Freyer, 1843)
- Synanthedon myopaeformis (Borkhausen, 1789)

=== Sphingidae ===
- Acherontia atropos (Linnaeus, 1758)
- Agrius convolvuli (Linnaeus, 1758)
- Clarina syriaca (Lederer, 1855)
- Daphnis nerii (Linnaeus, 1758)
- Hippotion celerio (Linnaeus, 1758)
- Hyles euphorbiae (Linnaeus, 1758)
- Hyles livornica (Esper, 1780)
- Macroglossum stellatarum (Linnaeus, 1758)
- Smerinthus kindermannii Lederer, 1857
- Theretra alecto (Linnaeus, 1758)

=== Stathmopodidae ===
- Neomariania partinicensis (Rebel, 1937)
- Tortilia graeca Kasy, 1981

=== Tineidae ===
- Ateliotum arenbergeri Petersen & Gaedike, 1985
- Cephimallota angusticostella (Zeller, 1839)
- Edosa fuscoviolacella (Ragonot, 1895)
- Eudarcia lobata (Petersen & Gaedike, 1979)
- Eudarcia echinatum (Petersen & Gaedike, 1985)
- Eudarcia holtzi (Rebel, 1902)
- Hapsifera luridella Zeller, 1847
- Infurcitinea cyprica Petersen & Gaedike, 1985
- Infurcitinea frustigerella (Walsingham, 1907)
- Infurcitinea graeca Gaedike, 1983
- Infurcitinea nedae Gaedike, 1983
- Infurcitinea nigropluviella (Walsingham, 1907)
- Monopis imella (Hübner, 1813)
- Morophaga morella (Duponchel, 1838)
- Myrmecozela parnassiella (Rebel, 1915)
- Myrmecozela stepicola Zagulajev, 1972
- Nemapogon cyprica Gaedike, 1986
- Nemapogon orientalis Petersen, 1961
- Nemapogon signatellus Petersen, 1957
- Neurothaumasia ankerella (Mann, 1867)
- Neurothaumasia macedonica Petersen, 1962
- Niditinea fuscella (Linnaeus, 1758)
- Niditinea tugurialis (Meyrick, 1932)
- Praeacedes atomosella (Walker, 1863)
- Tinea murariella Staudinger, 1859
- Tinea translucens Meyrick, 1917
- Trichophaga tapetzella (Linnaeus, 1758)

=== Tischeriidae ===
- Coptotriche marginea (Haworth, 1828)

=== Tortricidae ===
- Acleris undulana (Walsingham, 1900)
- Acleris variegana (Denis & Schiffermuller, 1775)
- Aethes bilbaensis (Rossler, 1877)
- Aethes francillana (Fabricius, 1794)
- Aethes kasyi Razowski, 1962
- Aethes mauritanica (Walsingham, 1898)
- Bactra lancealana (Hübner, 1799)
- Bactra venosana (Zeller, 1847)
- Cacoecimorpha pronubana (Hübner, 1799)
- Celypha rufana (Scopoli, 1763)
- Clepsis consimilana (Hübner, 1817)
- Cnephasia gueneeana (Duponchel, 1836)
- Cnephasia orientana (Alphéraky, 1876)
- Cnephasia pumicana (Zeller, 1847)
- Cnephasia tofina Meyrick, 1922
- Cochylidia heydeniana (Herrich-Schäffer, 1851)
- Cochylimorpha alternana (Stephens, 1834)
- Cochylimorpha straminea (Haworth, 1811)
- Cochylis molliculana Zeller, 1847
- Cochylis posterana Zeller, 1847
- Crocidosema plebejana Zeller, 1847
- Cydia amplana (Hübner, 1800)
- Cydia fagiglandana (Zeller, 1841)
- Cydia microgrammana (Guenee, 1845)
- Cydia pomonella (Linnaeus, 1758)
- Cydia splendana (Hübner, 1799)
- Cydia trogodana Prose, 1988
- Endothenia gentianaeana (Hübner, 1799)
- Eucosma campoliliana (Denis & Schiffermuller, 1775)
- Grapholita funebrana Treitschke, 1835
- Grapholita discretana Wocke, 1861
- Grapholita lunulana (Denis & Schiffermuller, 1775)
- Gypsonoma sociana (Haworth, 1811)
- Hedya pruniana (Hübner, 1799)
- Lobesia botrana (Denis & Schiffermuller, 1775)
- Lobesia indusiana (Zeller, 1847)
- Neosphaleroptera nubilana (Hübner, 1799)
- Notocelia uddmanniana (Linnaeus, 1758)
- Pammene crataegophila Amsel, 1935
- Pammene fasciana (Linnaeus, 1761)
- Pelochrista modicana (Zeller, 1847)
- Phalonidia contractana (Zeller, 1847)
- Phtheochroa decipiens Walsingham, 1900
- Phtheochroa dodrantaria (Razowski, 1970)
- Pseudococcyx tessulatana (Staudinger, 1871)
- Rhyacionia buoliana (Denis & Schiffermuller, 1775)
- Spilonota ocellana (Denis & Schiffermuller, 1775)
- Zeiraphera isertana (Fabricius, 1794)

=== Yponomeutidae ===
- Yponomeuta padella (Linnaeus, 1758)
- Zelleria oleastrella (Milliere, 1864)

=== Ypsolophidae ===
- Ypsolopha instabilella (Mann, 1866)
- Ypsolopha persicella (Fabricius, 1787)

=== Zygaenidae ===
- Jordanita graeca (Jordan, 1907)
- Jordanita anatolica (Naufock, 1929)
- Theresimima ampellophaga (Bayle-Barelle, 1808)
