= Scopula confinaria =

Scientific classification
- Domain: Eukaryota
- Kingdom: Animalia
- Phylum: Arthropoda
- Class: Insecta
- Order: Lepidoptera
- Family: Geometridae
- Genus: Scopula
- Species: S. confinaria

Binomial name
- Scopula confinaria (Herrich-Schäffer, 1847)

Synonyms
- Acidalia confinaria Herrich-Schäffer, 1847; Glossotrophia confinaria; Glossotrophia aetnaea Prout, 1935; Glossotrophia prouti Hausmann, 1993; Glossotrophia scoblei Hausmann, 1993; Glossotrophia corrivularia Millière, 1869; Glossotrophia perfalsaria Prout, 1934

Species of geometer moth in subfamily Sterrhinae

Scopula confinaria is a moth of the family Geometridae. It is found in southern Europe, southern Russia and Turkey.

The larvae feed on Silene and Dianthus species.

== Subspecies ==
- Scopula confinaria confinaria
- Scopula confinaria aetnaea (Prout, 1935)
- Scopula confinaria prouti (Hausmann, 1993)
- Scopula confinaria scoblei (Hausmann, 1993)

Scopula sacraria is treated as a subspecies (Scopula confinaria sacraria) by some authors. The same is true for Scopula uberaria (Scopula confinaria uberaria).
