= Stigmella pyrellicola =

Scientific classification
- Kingdom: Animalia
- Phylum: Arthropoda
- Clade: Pancrustacea
- Class: Insecta
- Order: Lepidoptera
- Family: Nepticulidae
- Genus: Stigmella
- Species: S. pyrellicola

Binomial name
- Stigmella pyrellicola (Klimesch, 1978)

Synonyms
- Nepticula pyrellicola Klimesch, 1978

Species of moth

Stigmella pyrellicola is a moth of the family Nepticulidae. It is found in Greece, Turkey and Cyprus.

The larvae feed on Rhamnus lycioides, Rhamnus oleoides microphyllus and Rhamnus pyrellus.
