= Orpecacantha pardalis =

Scientific classification
- Kingdom: Animalia
- Phylum: Arthropoda
- Clade: Pancrustacea
- Class: Insecta
- Order: Lepidoptera
- Family: Autostichidae
- Genus: Orpecacantha
- Species: O. pardalis

Binomial name
- Orpecacantha pardalis Gozmány, 2008

Species of moth

Orpecacantha pardalis is a moth in the family Autostichidae. It was described by László Anthony Gozmány in 2008. It is found in Iran.
