= Orpecacantha oxydata =

Scientific classification
- Kingdom: Animalia
- Phylum: Arthropoda
- Clade: Pancrustacea
- Class: Insecta
- Order: Lepidoptera
- Family: Autostichidae
- Genus: Orpecacantha
- Species: O. oxydata

Binomial name
- Orpecacantha oxydata Gozmány, 2008

Species of moth

Orpecacantha oxydata is a moth in the family Autostichidae. It was described by László Anthony Gozmány in 2008. It is found in Afghanistan.
