= Orpecacantha =

Scientific classification
- Kingdom: Animalia
- Phylum: Arthropoda
- Clade: Pancrustacea
- Class: Insecta
- Order: Lepidoptera
- Family: Autostichidae
- Subfamily: Symmocinae
- Genus: Orpecacantha; Gozmány, 2008

Genus of moths

Orpecacantha is a genus of moths in the family Autostichidae.

== Species ==
- Orpecacantha afghana Gozmány, 2008
- Orpecacantha aphrodite (Gozmány, 1986)
- Orpecacantha burmanni (Gozmány, 1962)
- Orpecacantha capnoptera Gozmány, 2008
- Orpecacantha multispina Gozmány, 2008
- Orpecacantha opacogramma Gozmány, 2008
- Orpecacantha oxydata Gozmány, 2008
- Orpecacantha pardalis Gozmány, 2008
- Orpecacantha singularis Gozmány, 2008
