= Orpecacantha burmanni =

Scientific classification
- Kingdom: Animalia
- Phylum: Arthropoda
- Clade: Pancrustacea
- Class: Insecta
- Order: Lepidoptera
- Family: Autostichidae
- Genus: Orpecacantha
- Species: O. burmanni

Binomial name
- Orpecacantha burmanni (Gozmány, 1962)

Synonyms
- Amselina burmanni Gozmány, 1962; Orpecovalva burmanni

Species of moth

Orpecacantha burmanni is a moth of the family Autostichidae. It is found in Spain.
