= Stigmella rhamnophila =

Scientific classification
- Kingdom: Animalia
- Phylum: Arthropoda
- Class: Insecta
- Order: Lepidoptera
- Family: Nepticulidae
- Genus: Stigmella
- Species: S. rhamnophila

Binomial name
- Stigmella rhamnophila (Amsel, 1934)

Synonyms
- Nepticula rhamnophila Amsel, 1934

Species of moth

Stigmella rhamnophila is a moth of the family Nepticulidae. It is found in Italy, Greece (including many of the islands), Cyprus and Israel.

The larvae feed on Rhamnus alaternus, Rhamnus lycioides, Rhamnus lycioides oleoides, Rhamnus palaestina and Rhamnus saxatilis. They mine the leaves of their host plant.
