= Orpecacantha singularis =

Scientific classification
- Kingdom: Animalia
- Phylum: Arthropoda
- Clade: Pancrustacea
- Class: Insecta
- Order: Lepidoptera
- Family: Autostichidae
- Genus: Orpecacantha
- Species: O. singularis

Binomial name
- Orpecacantha singularis Gozmány, 2008

Synonyms
- Orpecovalva singularis

Species of moth

Orpecacantha singularis is a moth in the family Autostichidae. It was described by László Anthony Gozmány in 2008. It is found in Iran.
