= Phyllonorycter troodi =

Scientific classification
- Kingdom: Animalia
- Phylum: Arthropoda
- Class: Insecta
- Order: Lepidoptera
- Family: Gracillariidae
- Genus: Phyllonorycter
- Species: P. troodi

Binomial name
- Phyllonorycter troodi Deschka, 1974

Species of moth

Phyllonorycter troodi is a moth of the family Gracillariidae. It is known from Cyprus.

The larvae feed on Quercus alnifolia species. They probably mine the leaves of their host plant.
