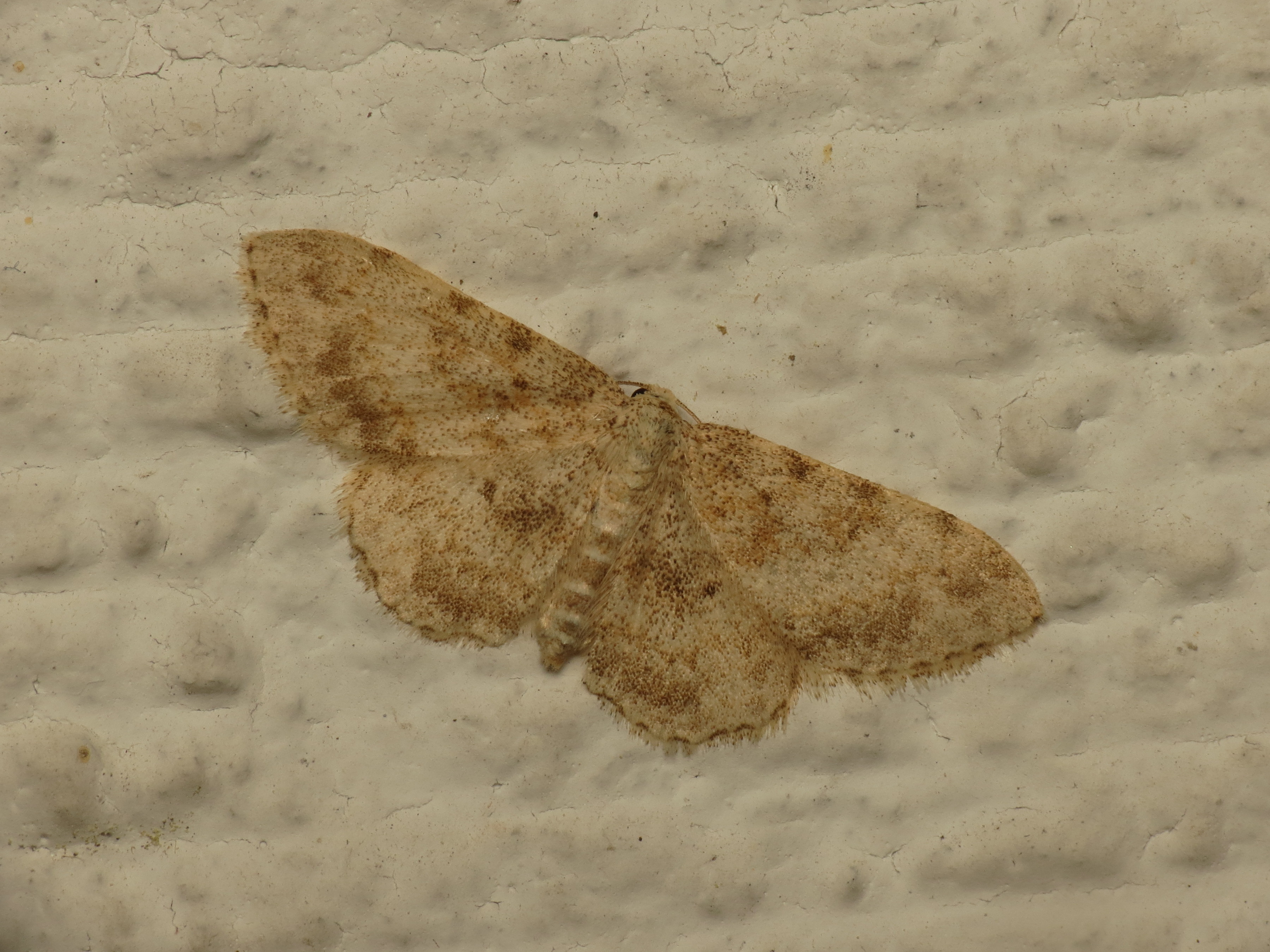

Scientific classification
- Kingdom: Animalia
- Phylum: Arthropoda
- Clade: Pancrustacea
- Class: Insecta
- Order: Lepidoptera
- Family: Geometridae
- Genus: Scopula
- Species: S. luridata

Binomial name
- Scopula luridata (Zeller, 1847)

Synonyms
- Idaea luridata Zeller, 1847; Acidalia coenosaria Lederer, 1855; Acidalia luridaria Herrich-Schaffer, 1852; Acidalia luridaria formosaria Herrich-Schäffer, 1852; Acidalia distracta Butler, 1881; Acidalia coenosaria chinensis Sterneck, 1931

= Scopula luridata =

Species of geometer moth in subfamily Sterrhinae

Scopula luridata is a moth of the family Geometridae. It is found in southern Europe, Asia Minor, China, Pakistan, India, Egypt, Somalia, Yemen, Oman and Japan.

== Subspecies ==
- Scopula luridata luridata
- Scopula luridata distracta (Butler, 1881) (Pakistan)
- Scopula luridata sternecki Prout, 1935 (Japan)
