= Scrobipalpa wiltshirei =

Scientific classification
- Kingdom: Animalia
- Phylum: Arthropoda
- Clade: Pancrustacea
- Class: Insecta
- Order: Lepidoptera
- Family: Gelechiidae
- Genus: Scrobipalpa
- Species: S. wiltshirei

Binomial name
- Scrobipalpa wiltshirei Povolný, 1966

Synonyms
- Scrobipalpa obrteliana Povolný, 1971

Species of moth

Scrobipalpa wiltshirei is a moth in the family Gelechiidae. It was described by Dalibor Povolný in 1966. It is found on the Canary Islands and in North Africa, southwestern Europe (Portugal, Spain), on Cyprus, and in the Middle East (Bahrain, Iran).

The length of the forewings is 4.5–5.5 mm (0.18–0.22 in).
