= Scopula decolor =

Scientific classification
- Domain: Eukaryota
- Kingdom: Animalia
- Phylum: Arthropoda
- Class: Insecta
- Order: Lepidoptera
- Family: Geometridae
- Genus: Scopula
- Species: S. decolor

Binomial name
- Scopula decolor (Staudinger, 1898)

Synonyms
- Acidalina decolor Staudinger, 1898

Species of geometer moth in subfamily Sterrhinae

Scopula decolor is a moth of the family Geometridae. It was described by Staudinger in 1898. It is found in Spain, Portugal and Italy and on Cyprus and Sardinia. It is also found in North Africa, including the type location of Algeria.

The wingspan is about 27 millimetres (1.1 in).
