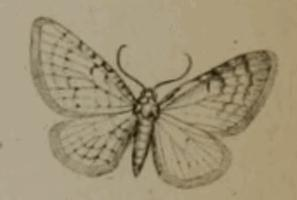

Scientific classification
- Domain: Eukaryota
- Kingdom: Animalia
- Phylum: Arthropoda
- Class: Insecta
- Order: Lepidoptera
- Family: Geometridae
- Genus: Eupithecia
- Species: E. cerussaria

Binomial name
- Eupithecia cerussaria (Lederer, 1855)

Synonyms
- Cidaria cerussaria Lederer, 1855

= Eupithecia cerussaria =

Species of moth

Eupithecia cerussaria is a moth in the family Geometridae. It is found on Cyprus and in Greece and the Near East.
