= Coleophora mausolella =

Scientific classification
- Kingdom: Animalia
- Phylum: Arthropoda
- Class: Insecta
- Order: Lepidoptera
- Family: Coleophoridae
- Genus: Coleophora
- Species: C. mausolella

Binomial name
- Coleophora mausolella Chretien, 1908

Synonyms
- Coleophora palaestinella Toll, 1942; Coleophora thermoleuca Meyrick, 1917

Species of moth

Coleophora mausolella is a moth of the family Coleophoridae. It is found in Spain, Portugal, France, Italy, Sardinia, Corsica, Sicily, Greece, Cyprus, Morocco, Libya, the Palestinian Territories, Turkmenistan, Turkey and the United Arab Emirates.

The larvae feed on Chenopodium species. They feed on the generative organs of their host plant.
