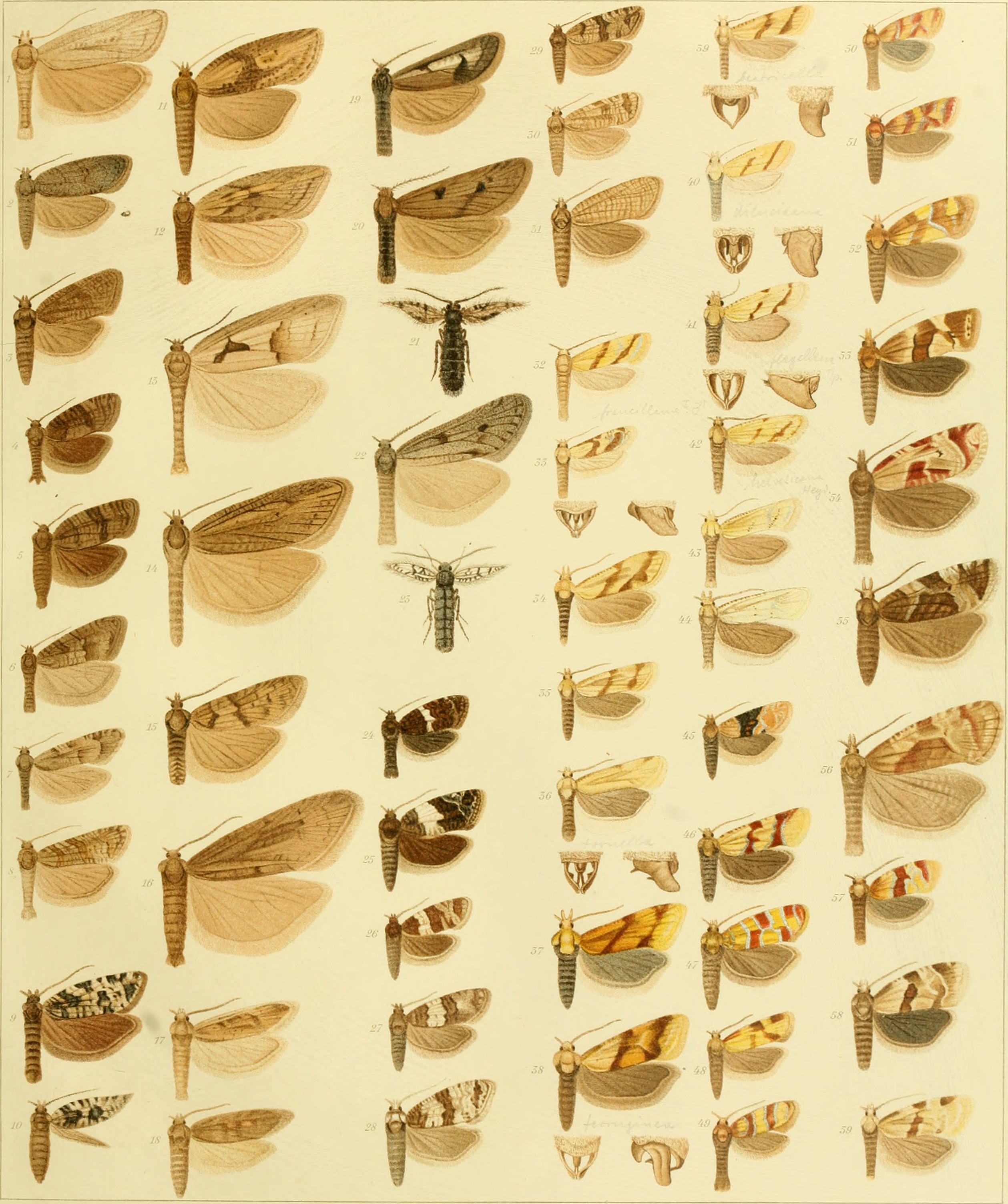
- Aethes mauritanica as Lozopera mauritanica in Die palaearktischen tortriciden

Scientific classification
- Kingdom: Animalia
- Phylum: Arthropoda
- Clade: Pancrustacea
- Class: Insecta
- Order: Lepidoptera
- Family: Tortricidae
- Genus: Aethes
- Species: A. mauritanica

Binomial name
- Aethes mauritanica (Walsingham, 1898)

Synonyms
- Lozopera mauritanica Walsingham, 1898; Lozopera albella Amsel, in Hartig & Amsel, 1952; Lozopera cornelia Turati, 1924

= Aethes mauritanica =

Species of moth

Aethes mauritanica is a species of moth of the family Tortricidae. It was described by Walsingham in 1898. It is found on Sardinia and Cyprus and in Spain, Germany, Italy, Bulgaria, Greece, Morocco, Libya and Turkey.

The wingspan is 9–17 millimetres (0.35–0.67 in). The forewings are pale primrose (yellow) with a chestnut streak and two chestnut fasciae sprinkled with silvery scales. The hindwings are tawny brownish grey. Adults are on wing from April to July.

The larvae feed on Elaeoselinum meoides.
