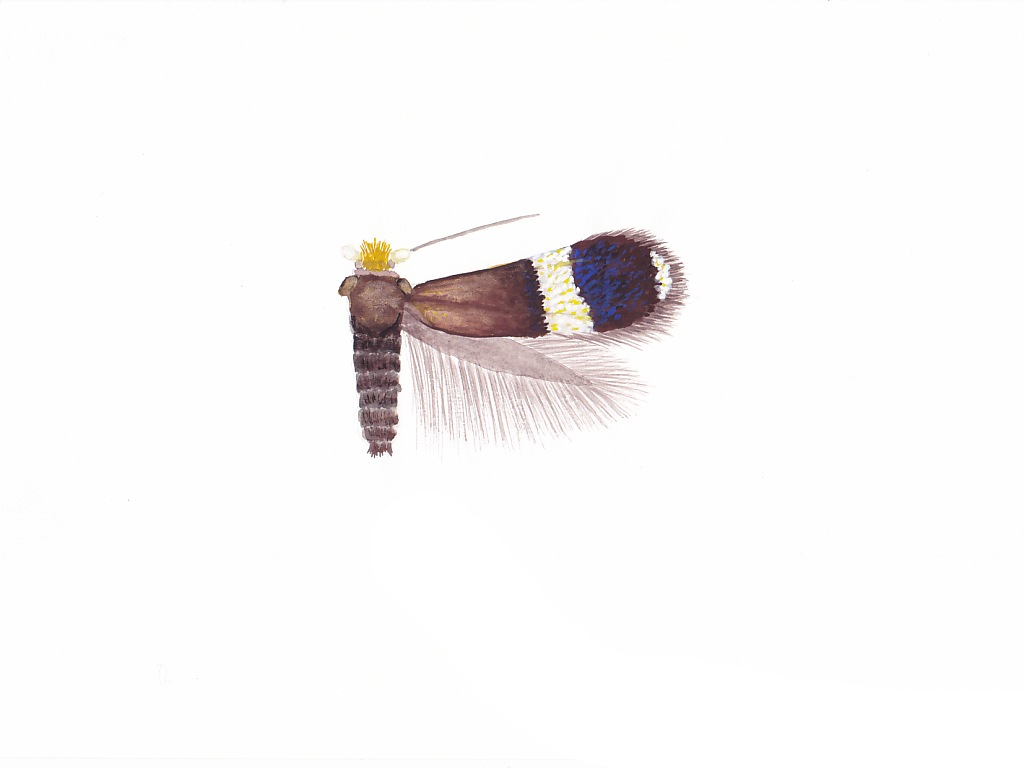

Scientific classification
- Kingdom: Animalia
- Phylum: Arthropoda
- Class: Insecta
- Order: Lepidoptera
- Family: Nepticulidae
- Genus: Stigmella
- Species: S. auromarginella

Binomial name
- Stigmella auromarginella (Richardson, 1890)

Synonyms
- Nepticula auromarginella Richardson, 1890

= Stigmella auromarginella =

Species of moth

Stigmella auromarginella is a moth of the family Nepticulidae. It is found from Sweden to Portugal, Crete and Cyprus and from Ireland to Croatia. It is much more common in the southern part of the range.

The wingspan is 3–5 mm. The head is ferruginous-orange, the antennal eyecaps ochreous-whitish. The forewings are deep shining golden-bronze with a shining golden -silvery fascia beyond middle, edged anteriorly with purple suffusion. The apical area beyond this is deep purple with an apical shining golden -silvery fascia, partly in cilia. Hindwings grey.

Adults are on wing from June to August and from September to November.

The larvae feed on Agrimonia, Rubus fruticosus, Rubus sanctus and Rubus ulmifolius. They mine the leaves of their host plant.
