= Coleophora semicinerea =

Scientific classification
- Kingdom: Animalia
- Phylum: Arthropoda
- Class: Insecta
- Order: Lepidoptera
- Family: Coleophoridae
- Genus: Coleophora
- Species: C. semicinerea

Binomial name
- Coleophora semicinerea Staudinger, 1859

Synonyms
- Coleophora medicaginella Toll, 1944

Species of moth

Coleophora semicinerea is a moth of the family Coleophoridae. It is found on the Canary Islands (Fuerteventura), Morocco, southern Europe (France, the Iberian Peninsula, Italy, Sardinia, Sicily, Greece, Crete and Cyprus) and Yemen.

The larvae feed on Colutea arborescens.
