= Agonopterix ferulae =

Scientific classification
- Kingdom: Animalia
- Phylum: Arthropoda
- Clade: Pancrustacea
- Class: Insecta
- Order: Lepidoptera
- Family: Depressariidae
- Genus: Agonopterix
- Species: A. ferulae

Binomial name
- Agonopterix ferulae (Zeller, 1847)

Synonyms
- Depressaria ferulae Zeller, 1847

Species of moth

Agonopterix ferulae is a moth of the family Depressariidae. It is found in Portugal, France and Italy and on Sicily and Cyprus. It has also been recorded from Morocco.

The larvae feed on Ferula communis.
