= Scrobipalpa bigoti =

Scientific classification
- Kingdom: Animalia
- Phylum: Arthropoda
- Clade: Pancrustacea
- Class: Insecta
- Order: Lepidoptera
- Family: Gelechiidae
- Genus: Scrobipalpa
- Species: S. bigoti

Binomial name
- Scrobipalpa bigoti Povolný, 1973

Synonyms
- Scrobipalpa (Euscrobipalpa) bigoti Povolný, 1973; Scrobipalpa bigoti tunesica Povolný, 1979

Species of moth

Scrobipalpa bigoti is a moth in the family Gelechiidae. It was described by Povolný in 1973. It is found in Tunisia, Spain, southern France, Sicily, Greece and Cyprus.

The length of the forewings is 3.8–4 mm (0.15–0.16 in).
