= Dioryctria mendacella =

Scientific classification
- Domain: Eukaryota
- Kingdom: Animalia
- Phylum: Arthropoda
- Class: Insecta
- Order: Lepidoptera
- Family: Pyralidae
- Genus: Dioryctria
- Species: D. mendacella

Binomial name
- Dioryctria mendacella (Staudinger, 1859)

Synonyms
- Nephopterix mendacella Staudinger, 1859; Euzophera maritanella Millière, 1875

Species of moth

Dioryctria mendacella is a species of snout moth in the genus Dioryctria. It was described by Staudinger in 1859, and is known from the Iberian Peninsula, Italy, France and Croatia, Greece and Cyprus.

The wingspan is 28–31 mm.
