= Stigmella pyrivora =

Scientific classification
- Kingdom: Animalia
- Phylum: Arthropoda
- Class: Insecta
- Order: Lepidoptera
- Family: Nepticulidae
- Genus: Stigmella
- Species: S. pyrivora

Binomial name
- Stigmella pyrivora Gustafsson, 1981

Species of moth

Stigmella pyrivora is a moth of the family Nepticulidae. It is endemic to Cyprus.

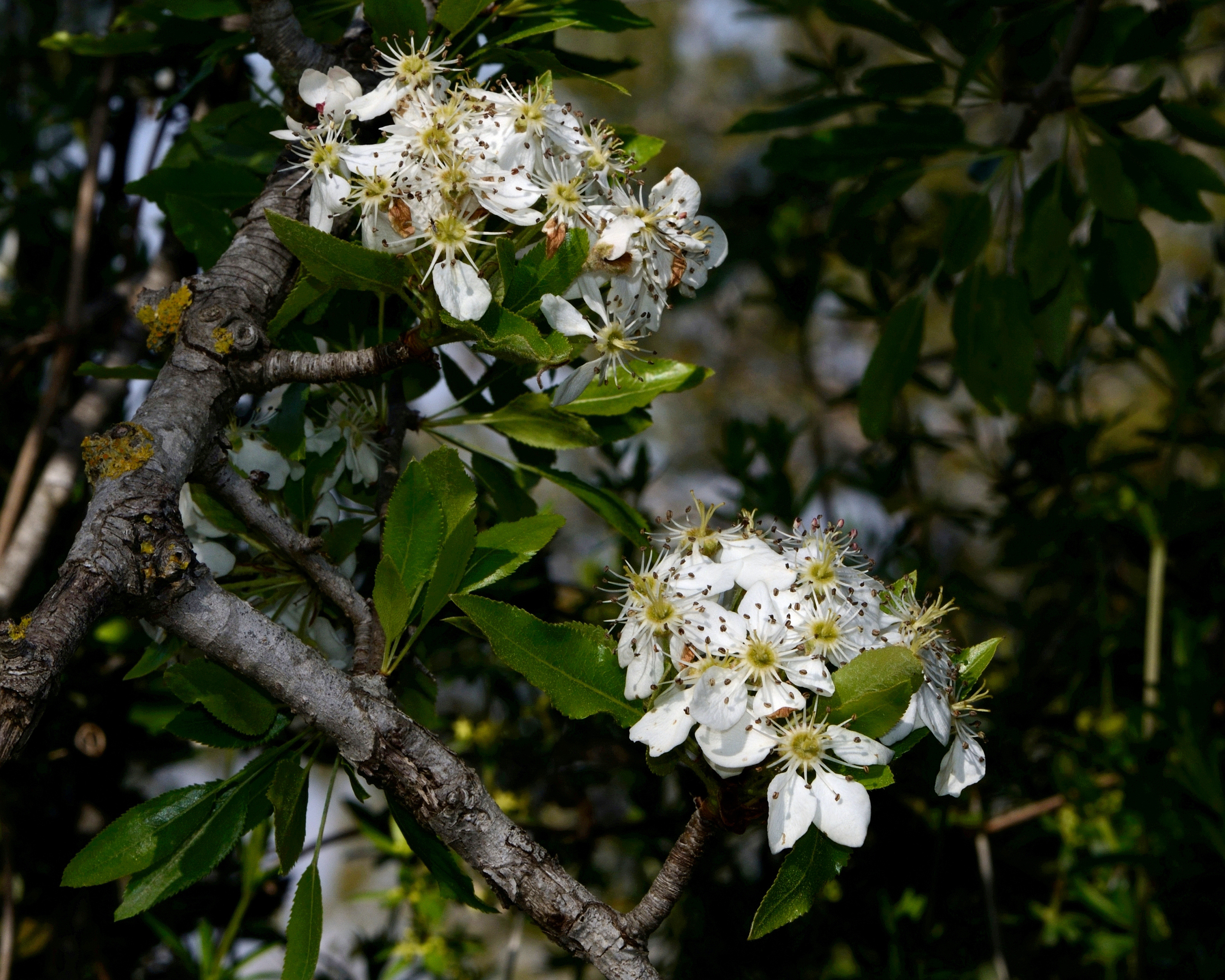
Pyrus syriaca, the host plant of the species

The larvae feed on Pyrus syriaca. They mine the leaves of their host plant. The mine resembles the mine of Stigmella paradoxa.
