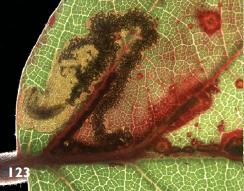
- Final instar larva on Rubus ulmifolius

Scientific classification
- Kingdom: Animalia
- Phylum: Arthropoda
- Class: Insecta
- Order: Lepidoptera
- Family: Nepticulidae
- Genus: Ectoedemia
- Species: E. erythrogenella

Binomial name
- Ectoedemia erythrogenella (de Joannis, 1908)

Synonyms
- Nepticula erythrogenella de Joannis, 1908

= Ectoedemia erythrogenella =

Species of moth

Ectoedemia erythrogenella is a moth of the family Nepticulidae. It is found from the coast of southern Great Britain and western France to the Iberian Peninsula, Corsica, Sardinia, Sicily, Greece and Cyprus.

The wingspan is 4.1-5.6 mm. Adults are on wing from May to July. There is one generations per year.

The larvae feed on Rubus sanguineus and Rubus ulmifolius. They mine the leaves of their host plant.

There is a very long period of larval feeding. In the northern part of its range larvae from September until November, but in the south larvae can be found all over the winter until March, April and occasionally later.
