= Coleophora luteolella =

Scientific classification
- Kingdom: Animalia
- Phylum: Arthropoda
- Class: Insecta
- Order: Lepidoptera
- Family: Coleophoridae
- Genus: Coleophora
- Species: C. luteolella

Binomial name
- Coleophora luteolella Staudinger, 1880

Synonyms
- Coleophora mendosella Toll, 1960

Species of moth

Coleophora luteolella is a moth of the family Coleophoridae. It is found in Spain, Portugal, France, Sardinia, Italy, Sicily, Greece, Crete, Cyprus, Morocco, Afghanistan and Asia Minor.
