= Coleophora arenbergerella =

Scientific classification
- Kingdom: Animalia
- Phylum: Arthropoda
- Clade: Pancrustacea
- Class: Insecta
- Order: Lepidoptera
- Family: Coleophoridae
- Genus: Coleophora
- Species: C. arenbergerella

Binomial name
- Coleophora arenbergerella Baldizzone, 1985

Synonyms
- Coleophora arenbergella

Species of moth

Coleophora arenbergerella is a moth of the family Coleophoridae that was described in 1985. It is found on Cyprus.
