= Coleophora jerusalemella =

Scientific classification
- Kingdom: Animalia
- Phylum: Arthropoda
- Class: Insecta
- Order: Lepidoptera
- Family: Coleophoridae
- Genus: Coleophora
- Species: C. jerusalemella

Binomial name
- Coleophora jerusalemella Toll, 1942

Species of moth

Coleophora jerusalemella is a moth of the family Coleophoridae. It is found in Spain, Greece, on Crete and Cyprus and in Algeria, Lebanon, the Palestinian Territories, Syria, Saudi Arabia, Oman, Iran, Jordan and the United Arab Emirates.

The larvae feed on the leaves of Inula viscosa.
