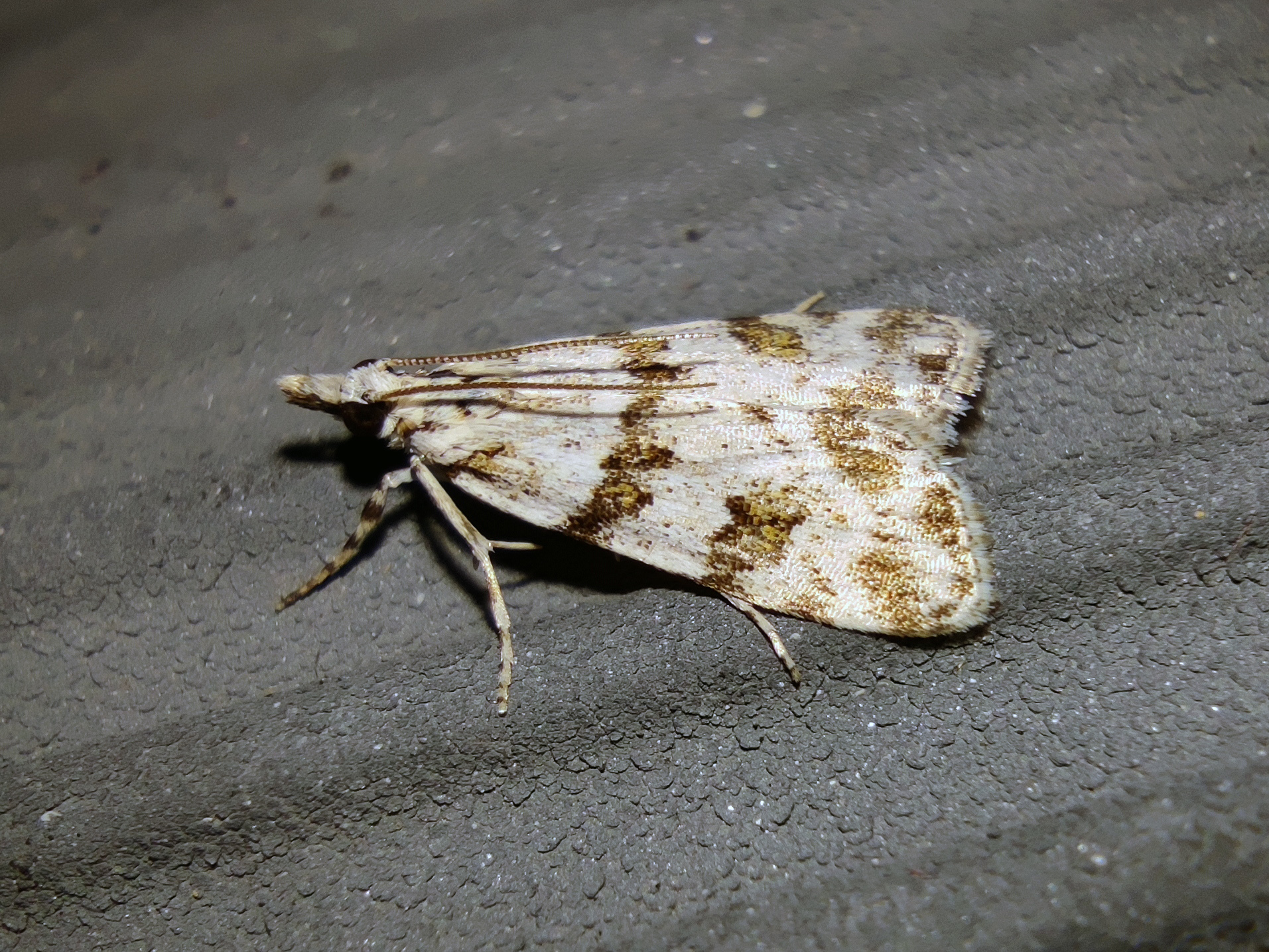

Scientific classification
- Kingdom: Animalia
- Phylum: Arthropoda
- Clade: Pancrustacea
- Class: Insecta
- Order: Lepidoptera
- Family: Crambidae
- Genus: Scoparia
- Species: S. ingratella

Binomial name
- Scoparia ingratella (Zeller, 1846)

Synonyms
- List: Eudorea ingratella Zeller, 1846; Scoparia ingratella catalonica Leraut, 1982; Eudorea ingratalis Herrich-Schäffer, [1853]; Eudorea sibirica Lederer, 1853; Eudorea ambigualis var. octavianella Mann, 1859; Phalaena majalis Scopoli, 1763

= Scoparia ingratella =

Species of moth

Scoparia ingratella is a species of moth in the family Crambidae. It is found in most of Europe, except Ireland, Great Britain, the Benelux, Portugal, Fennoscandia, the Baltic region and Ukraine.

The wingspan is 20–25 mm. Adults are on wing from May to late July in one generation per year.
