= Scoparia berytella =

Scientific classification
- Kingdom: Animalia
- Phylum: Arthropoda
- Class: Insecta
- Order: Lepidoptera
- Family: Crambidae
- Genus: Scoparia
- Species: S. berytella

Binomial name
- Scoparia berytella Rebel, 1911

Synonyms
- Scoparia basistrigalis var. syriaca Caradja, 1916; Scoparia coprista Meyrick, 1936; Scoparia unicolorella Amsel, 1958; Scoparia unicornutella Amsel, 1958

Species of moth

Scoparia berytella is a species of moth in the family Crambidae. It is found on Cyprus, as well as in Syria and Lebanon.

The wingspan is about 19 mm.
