= Cosmopterix pararufella =

Scientific classification
- Kingdom: Animalia
- Phylum: Arthropoda
- Class: Insecta
- Order: Lepidoptera
- Family: Cosmopterigidae
- Genus: Cosmopterix
- Species: C. pararufella

Binomial name
- Cosmopterix pararufella Riedl, 1976

Species of moth

Cosmopterix pararufella is a moth of the family Cosmopterigidae. It is known from Spain, Greece, Corsica, Crete, Cyprus and North Africa, including Egypt.

The wingspan is about 11 mm.

The larvae have been recorded feeding on Saccharum officinarum. They mine the leaves of their host plant.
