= Aristotelia calastomella =

Scientific classification
- Kingdom: Animalia
- Phylum: Arthropoda
- Clade: Pancrustacea
- Class: Insecta
- Order: Lepidoptera
- Family: Gelechiidae
- Genus: Aristotelia
- Species: A. calastomella

Binomial name
- Aristotelia calastomella (Christoph, 1873)

Synonyms
- Ergatis calastomella Christoph, 1873

Species of moth

Aristotelia calastomella is a moth of the family Gelechiidae. It is found in Hungary, Ukraine and Russia, as well as on Cyprus. The habitat consists of meadows with Glycyrrhiza glabra and Limonium gmelini.
