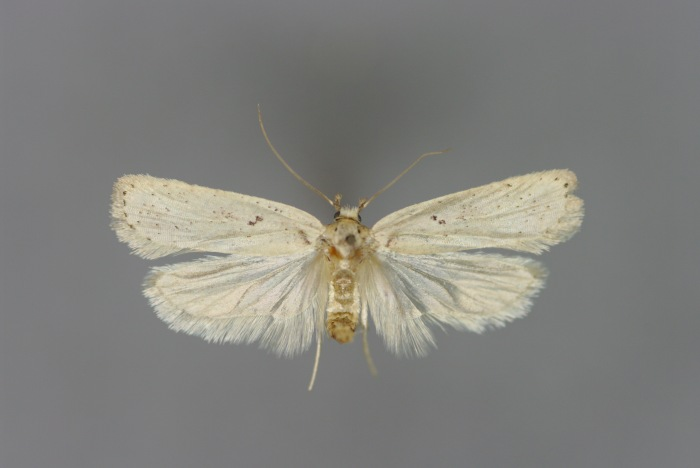

Scientific classification
- Kingdom: Animalia
- Phylum: Arthropoda
- Clade: Pancrustacea
- Class: Insecta
- Order: Lepidoptera
- Family: Depressariidae
- Genus: Agonopterix
- Species: A. nodiflorella

Binomial name
- Agonopterix nodiflorella (Milliere, 1866)

Synonyms
- Depressaria nodiflorella Milliere, 1866

= Agonopterix nodiflorella =

Species of moth

Agonopterix nodiflorella is a moth of the family Depressariidae. It is found in most of southern Europe.

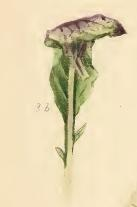
Leaflets of Ferula ferulago mined by the young larva and the web formed by it on a leaf of Ferula ferulago

Young larva

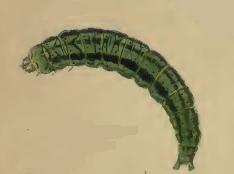
Older larva

The larvae feed on Ferula communis. They initially mine the leaves of their host plant. Larvae can be found from March to April. Young larvae are green with a black head.
