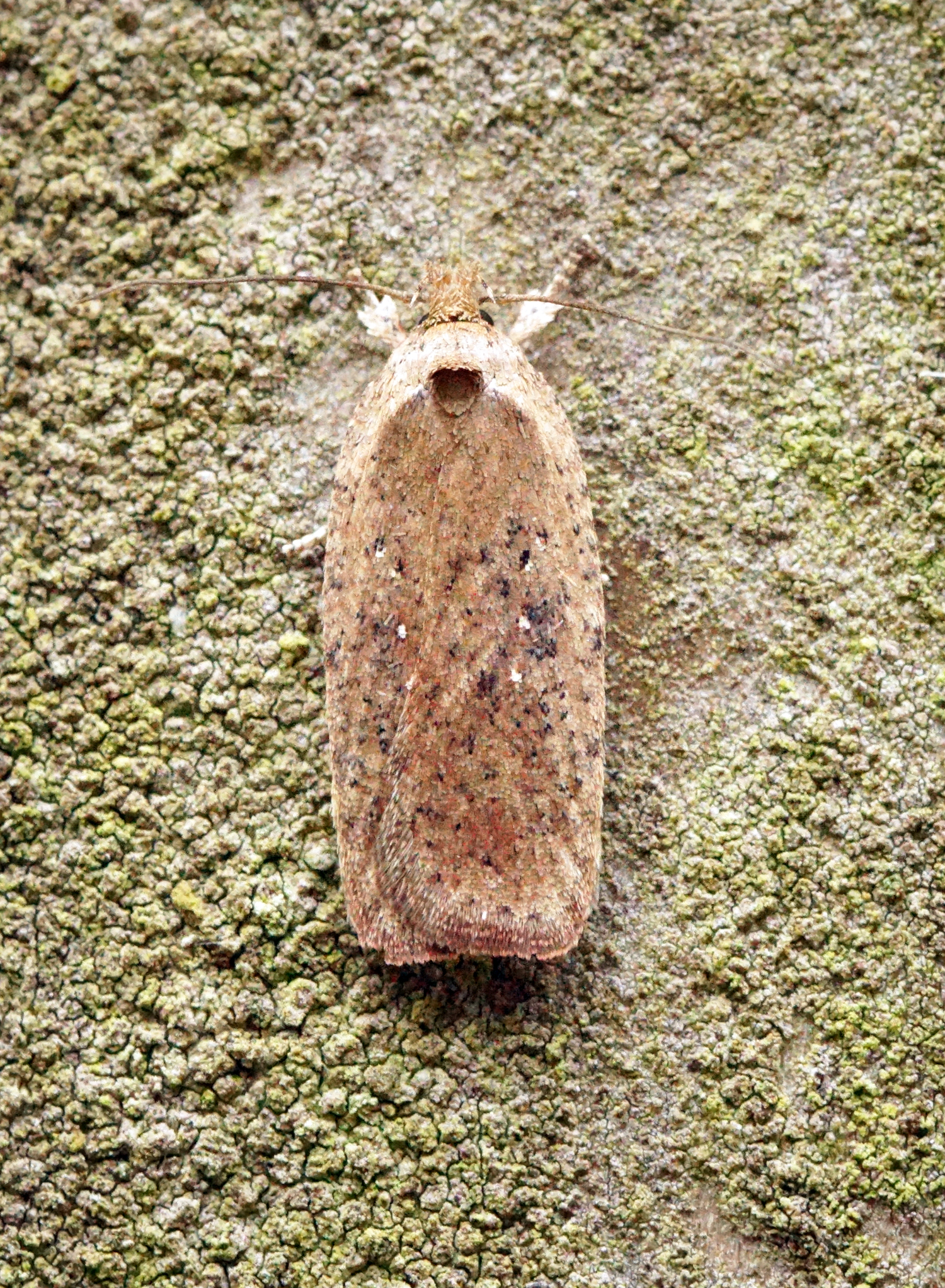

Scientific classification
- Kingdom: Animalia
- Phylum: Arthropoda
- Clade: Pancrustacea
- Class: Insecta
- Order: Lepidoptera
- Family: Depressariidae
- Genus: Agonopterix
- Species: A. scopariella

Binomial name
- Agonopterix scopariella (Heinemann, 1870)

Synonyms
- List: Depressaria scopariella Heinemann, 1870; Depressaria calycotomella Amsel, 1958; Depressaria rubescens Heinemann, 1870; Depressaria rubropunctella Lhomme, 1929

= Agonopterix scopariella =

Species of moth

Agonopterix scopariella is a moth of the family Depressariidae. It is found in most of Europe, except Ireland, most of the Balkan Peninsula, Ukraine, Finland and the Baltic region.

The wingspan is 18–23 mm. They are on wing from August to April.

The larvae feed on broom (Cytisus scoparius). They feed in spun shoots of their host plant. Larvae can be found from June to late July. The species overwinters as an adult.

== Subspecies ==
- Agonopterix scopariella scopariella
- Agonopterix scopariella calycotomella Amsel, 1958 (Cyprus)
