= Phyllonorycter obtusifoliella =

Scientific classification
- Kingdom: Animalia
- Phylum: Arthropoda
- Class: Insecta
- Order: Lepidoptera
- Family: Gracillariidae
- Genus: Phyllonorycter
- Species: P. obtusifoliella

Binomial name
- Phyllonorycter obtusifoliella Deschka, 1974

Species of moth

Phyllonorycter obtusifoliella is a moth of the family Gracillariidae. It is known from the Peloponnese and Cyprus.

The larvae feed on Acer creticum, Acer obtusifolium and Acer sempervirens.
