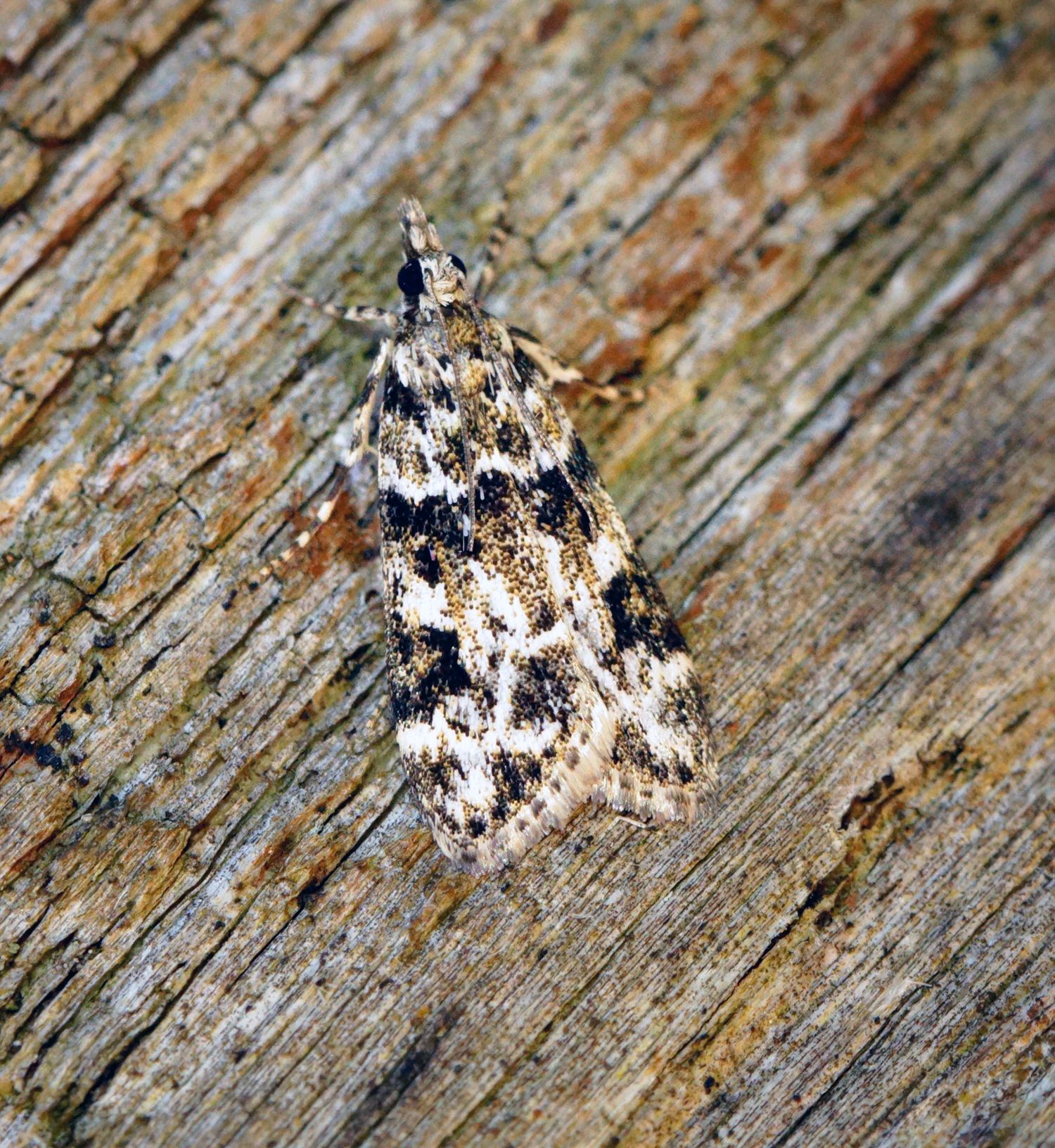

Scientific classification
- Kingdom: Animalia
- Phylum: Arthropoda
- Clade: Pancrustacea
- Class: Insecta
- Order: Lepidoptera
- Family: Crambidae
- Genus: Eudonia
- Species: E. delunella

Binomial name
- Eudonia delunella (Stainton, 1849)

Synonyms
- Eudorea delunella Stainton, 1849; Eudonia delunella amicula Leraut, 1981; Dipleurina resinea f. pernigralis Turati, 1923; Eudorea vandaliella Herrich-Schäffer, [1852]; Eudonia delunella orientalis (Alphéraky, 1876); Scoparia resinea Haworth, 1811; Scoparia resinalis Guenée, 1854

= Eudonia delunella =

Species of moth

Eudonia delunella is a species of moth of the family Crambidae. It was described by Henry Tibbats Stainton in 1849 and is found in Europe.

The wingspan is 17–18 mm (0.67–0.71 in). The forewings are white, irregularly blackish-mixed with a black triangular mark from base of costa; lines white, dark-edged, first irregular, second strongly sinuate; an irregular blackish costal blotch beyond first including orbicular and claviform, and a quadrate blotch before second concealing discal spot; terminal area blackish, subterminal line white, touching second in middle. Hindwings are light grey, darker terminally; a darker discal mark. The larva is greenish-yellow; spots, head, and plate of 2 dark bronzy -brown.

The moth flies from June to September depending on the location.

The larvae feed on various mosses and lichen.
