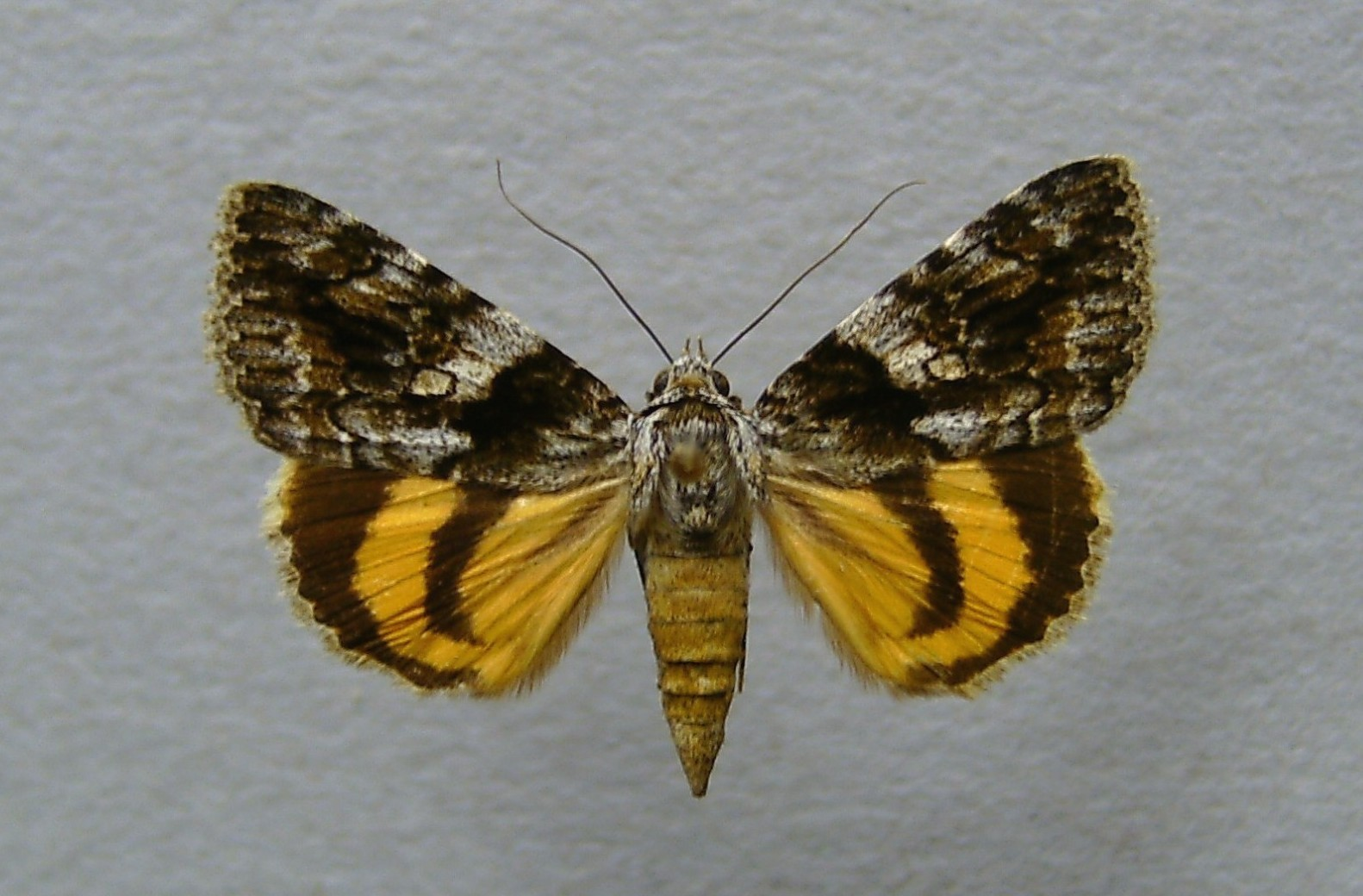

Scientific classification
- Kingdom: Animalia
- Phylum: Arthropoda
- Class: Insecta
- Order: Lepidoptera
- Superfamily: Noctuoidea
- Family: Erebidae
- Genus: Catocala
- Species: C. diversa

Binomial name
- Catocala diversa (Geyer, 1826)

Synonyms
- Noctua diversa Geyer, 1826; Catocala callinympha Duponchel, 1842

= Catocala diversa =

Species of moth

Catocala diversa is a moth of the family Erebidae first described by Carl Geyer in 1826. It is found in Spain, south-eastern France, Italy, the Balkans, European southern Russia and Israel.

There is one generation per year. Adults are on wing from May to July.

The larvae feed on Quercus species.
