= Dichomeris limbipunctella =

Scientific classification
- Domain: Eukaryota
- Kingdom: Animalia
- Phylum: Arthropoda
- Class: Insecta
- Order: Lepidoptera
- Family: Gelechiidae
- Genus: Dichomeris
- Species: D. limbipunctella

Binomial name
- Dichomeris limbipunctella (Staudinger, 1859)

Synonyms
- Hypsolophus limbipunctellus Staudinger, 1859; Dichomeris millierellus Stainton, 1873; Dichomeris neatodes Meyrick, 1923; Dichomeris limbipunctellus Staudinger, 1859

Species of moth

Dichomeris limbipunctella is a moth in the family Gelechiidae. It is found in Portugal, Spain, France, Italy, North Macedonia, Greece, as well as on Corsica, Sardinia, Crete, Cyprus and in North Africa.

The wingspan is about 20 mm (0.79 in). The forewings are light grey, suffusedly mixed with whitish towards the costa and with indistinct fine lines of blackish scales on the veins, and indistinct fine lines of whitish scales between these posteriorly and towards the dorsum, within the cell with obscure streaks of blackish irroration above the lower edge anteriorly and beneath the upper edge posteriorly. The stigmata are small, black and the first discal is indistinct, the plical linear, rather before the first discal. There is a marginal series of rather large triangular black dots on the apical part of the costa and termen. The hindwings are light grey.
