= Coleophora zernyi =

Scientific classification
- Kingdom: Animalia
- Phylum: Arthropoda
- Class: Insecta
- Order: Lepidoptera
- Family: Coleophoridae
- Genus: Coleophora
- Species: C. zernyi

Binomial name
- Coleophora zernyi Toll, 1944

Species of moth

Coleophora zernyi is a moth of the family Coleophoridae. It is found in Spain, Corsica, Sardinia, Cyprus and Lebanon.

The wingspan is about 17 mm.

== Etymology ==
It is named for the entomologist Dr. Hans Anton Zerny.
