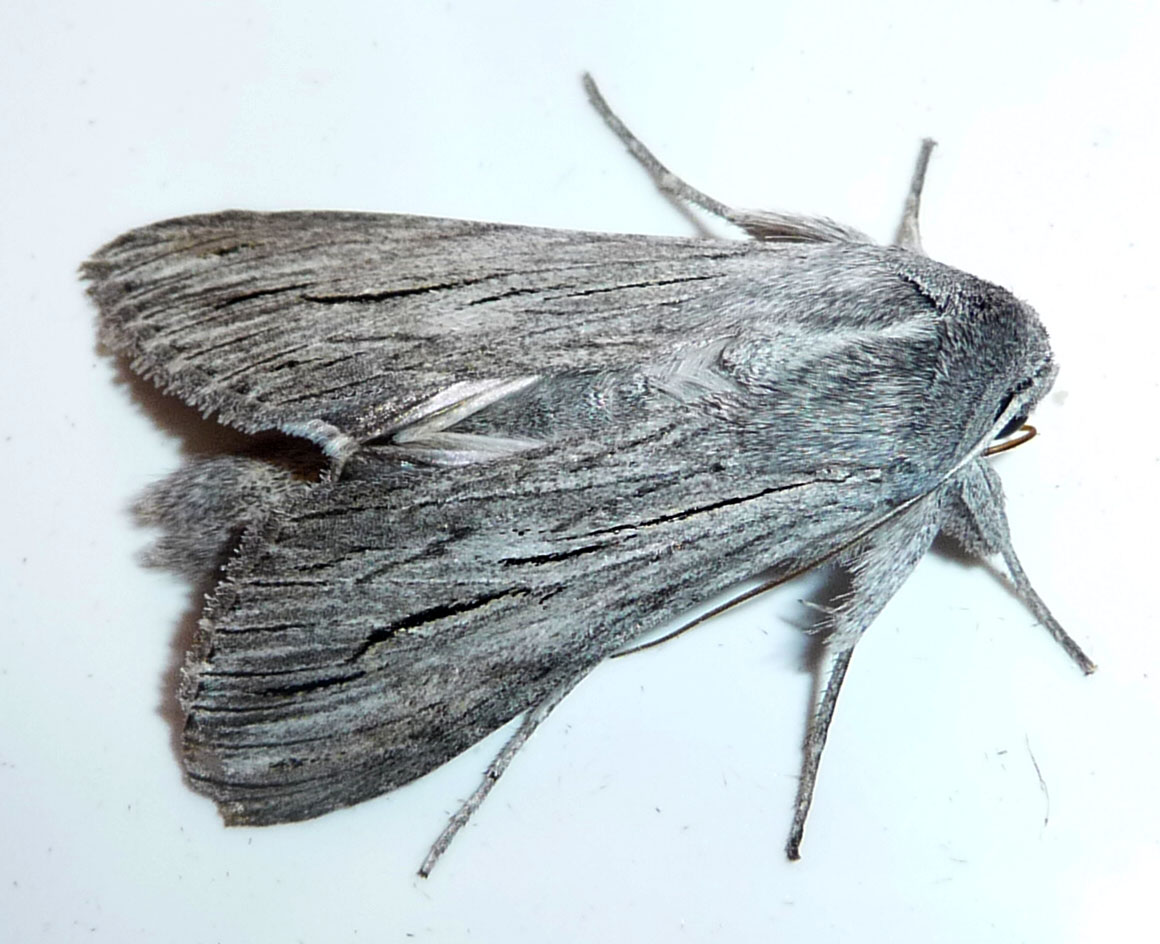

Scientific classification
- Domain: Eukaryota
- Kingdom: Animalia
- Phylum: Arthropoda
- Class: Insecta
- Order: Lepidoptera
- Superfamily: Noctuoidea
- Family: Noctuidae
- Genus: Cucullia
- Species: C. syrtana

Binomial name
- Cucullia syrtana (Mabille, 1888)

= Cucullia syrtana =

Species of moth

Cucullia syrtana is a moth of the family Noctuidae first described by Paul Mabille in 1888. It is widely distributed in the desert and semi desert zone from the western Sahara and Morocco to Egypt, the Arabian Peninsula, Iraq and Iran. It has also been recorded on Malta and in Greece.

Adults are on wing from November to April. There is probably one generation per year.

Larvae possibly feed on Launaea species.
