= Dichomeris lamprostoma =

Scientific classification
- Kingdom: Animalia
- Phylum: Arthropoda
- Clade: Pancrustacea
- Class: Insecta
- Order: Lepidoptera
- Family: Gelechiidae
- Genus: Dichomeris
- Species: D. lamprostoma

Binomial name
- Dichomeris lamprostoma (Zeller, 1847)

Synonyms
- Gelechia lamprostoma Zeller, 1847; Onebala lamprostoma; Anacampis scutata Meyrick, 1894

Species of moth

Dichomeris lamprostoma is a moth of the family Gelechiidae. It was described by Zeller in 1847. It is found in France and Spain, as well as on Sardinia, Sicily, Crete, Cyprus and the Canary Islands. It has also been recorded from Kenya and the United Arab Emirates.

The larvae feed on Convolvulus althaeoides and Convolvulus arvensis. They spin the leaves of their host plant, and mine them from within a silken tube. Larvae can be found from May to June and in November.
