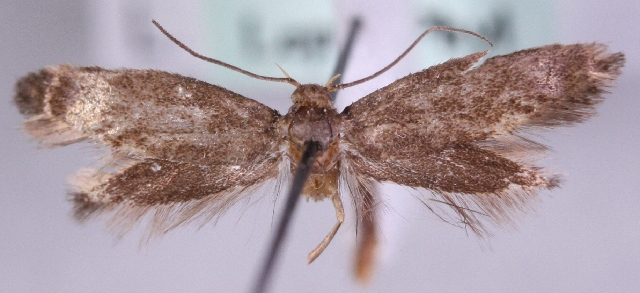

Scientific classification
- Domain: Eukaryota
- Kingdom: Animalia
- Phylum: Arthropoda
- Class: Insecta
- Order: Lepidoptera
- Family: Elachistidae
- Genus: Elachista
- Species: E. pigerella

Binomial name
- Elachista pigerella (Herrich-Schäffer, 1854)

Synonyms
- Symmoca pigerella Herrich-Schäffer, 1854; Atachia bilbaensis Rebel, 1893; Elachista fuscochreella Frey, 1856; Elachista muehligiella Frey, 1856; Elachista fuscogrisella Rebel, 1936; Oecophora incolorella Constant, 1890; Oecophora thorencella Milliere, 1875

= Elachista pigerella =

Species of moth

Elachista pigerella is a moth of the family Elachistidae. It is found from Germany to the Iberian Peninsula, Sardinia and Italy. It is also found in Russia and on Cyprus.

Adults are brownish and unicolorous.

The larvae feed on Carex flacca. They mine the leaves of their host plant. Larvae can be found from April to June.
