= Eupithecia quercetica =

Scientific classification
- Kingdom: Animalia
- Phylum: Arthropoda
- Clade: Pancrustacea
- Class: Insecta
- Order: Lepidoptera
- Family: Geometridae
- Genus: Eupithecia
- Species: E. quercetica

Binomial name
- Eupithecia quercetica Prout, 1938

Synonyms
- Eupithecia buxata Pinker, 1958

Species of moth

Eupithecia quercetica is a moth in the family Geometridae. It is found in Ukraine, Bulgaria, North Macedonia, Greece, Crete, Cyprus and the Near East.

The wingspan is 18–20 mm.
