= Orpecacantha aphrodite =

Scientific classification
- Kingdom: Animalia
- Phylum: Arthropoda
- Clade: Pancrustacea
- Class: Insecta
- Order: Lepidoptera
- Family: Autostichidae
- Genus: Orpecacantha
- Species: O. aphrodite

Binomial name
- Orpecacantha aphrodite (Gozmány, 1986)

Synonyms
- Orpecovalva aphrodite Gozmány, 1986; Orpecacantha aphodite

Species of moth

Orpecacantha aphrodite is a moth of the family Autostichidae. It is found on Cyprus.

The wingspan is 11–12 mm.
