= Eupithecia reisserata =

Scientific classification
- Domain: Eukaryota
- Kingdom: Animalia
- Phylum: Arthropoda
- Class: Insecta
- Order: Lepidoptera
- Family: Geometridae
- Genus: Eupithecia
- Species: E. reisserata

Binomial name
- Eupithecia reisserata Pinker, 1976

Species of moth

Eupithecia reisserata is a moth in the family Geometridae. It is found in Anatolia, Jordan, Azerbaijan, Syria, Greece and on Cyprus.

The wingspan is about 15–17 mm.

== Subspecies ==
- Eupithecia reisserata reisserata
- Eupithecia reisserata levarii Hausmann, 1991 (Jordan)
