= Stigmella azaroli =

Scientific classification
- Kingdom: Animalia
- Phylum: Arthropoda
- Clade: Pancrustacea
- Class: Insecta
- Order: Lepidoptera
- Family: Nepticulidae
- Genus: Stigmella
- Species: S. azaroli

Binomial name
- Stigmella azaroli (Klimesch, 1978)

Synonyms
- Nepticula azaroli Klimesch, 1978

Species of moth

Stigmella azaroli is a moth of the family Nepticulidae. It is found in Greece and on Cyprus.

The larvae feed on Crataegus azarolus. They mine the leaves of their host plant.
