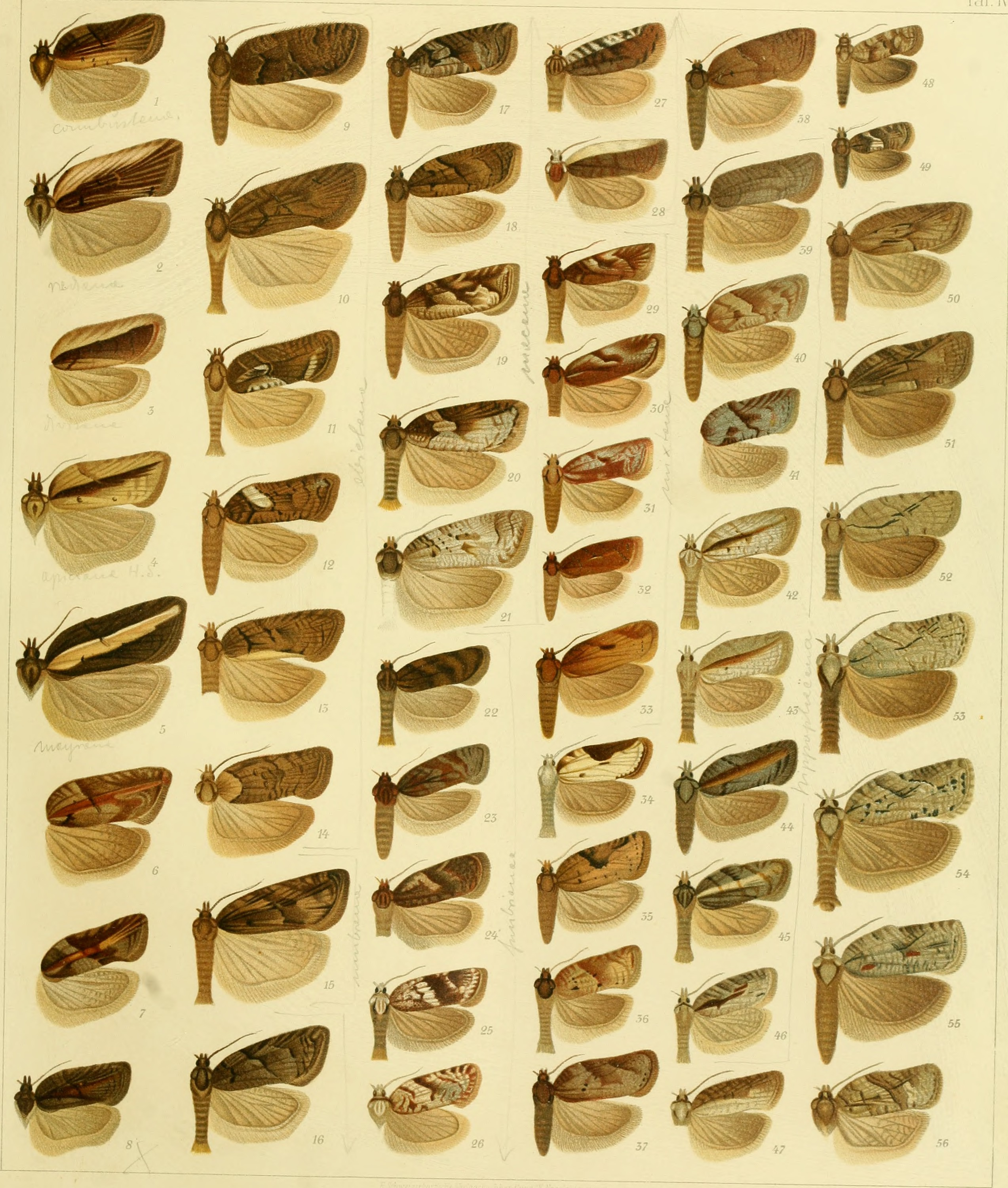
- Acleris undulana as Acalla undulana in Die palaearktischen tortriciden

Scientific classification
- Domain: Eukaryota
- Kingdom: Animalia
- Phylum: Arthropoda
- Class: Insecta
- Order: Lepidoptera
- Family: Tortricidae
- Genus: Acleris
- Species: A. undulana

Binomial name
- Acleris undulana (Walsingham, 1900)

Synonyms
- Oxygrapha undulana Walsingham, 1900; Peronea aphorista Meyrick, 1923; Oxygrapha undulana var. coprana Walsingham, 1900; Acleris subcoprana Obraztsov, 1956

= Acleris undulana =

Species of moth

Acleris undulana, the cedar leaf moth, is a species of moth of the family Tortricidae. It is found in Spain, Cyprus, Asia Minor, Syria and Russia (Altai).

The wingspan is 12–14 mm. The forewings are pale greyish cinereous (ash grey), with greyish transverse shading. The hindwings are brownish grey, darkening towards the apex and termen.

The larvae feed on Cedrus libani.
