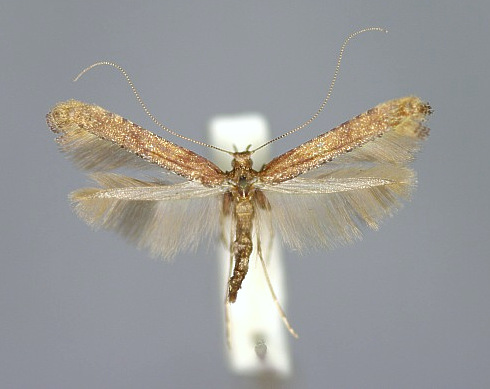

Scientific classification
- Domain: Eukaryota
- Kingdom: Animalia
- Phylum: Arthropoda
- Class: Insecta
- Order: Lepidoptera
- Family: Gracillariidae
- Genus: Caloptilia
- Species: C. falconipennella

Binomial name
- Caloptilia falconipennella (Hübner, 1813)

Synonyms
- Tinea falconipennella Hübner, 1813; Caloptilia oneratella (Zeller, 1847)

= Caloptilia falconipennella =

Species of moth

Caloptilia falconipennella is a moth of the family Gracillariidae. It is known throughout all of Europe, except the Balkan Peninsula.

The wingspan is about 13 millimetres (0.51 in). The forewings are dark reddish-fuscous irrorated with whitish; margins and folds dotted with black and an indistinct whitish triangular costal blotch before middle. Hindwings are dark grey.

Adults are on wing in September and overwinter, reappearing in the spring.

The larvae feed on alder (Alnus glutinosa).
