= Coleophora maritimella =

Scientific classification
- Kingdom: Animalia
- Phylum: Arthropoda
- Class: Insecta
- Order: Lepidoptera
- Family: Coleophoridae
- Genus: Coleophora
- Species: C. maritimella

Binomial name
- Coleophora maritimella Newman, 1873

Synonyms
- Coleophora obtusella Stainton, 1874

Species of moth

Coleophora maritimella is a moth of the family Coleophoridae found in Africa and Europe.

== Description ==
The wingspan is 9–11 mm. Head whitish-brown. Antennae white, ringed with fuscous. Forewings light brownish, with a few darker scales; costa whitish from base to 2/3; veins indistinctly marked with whitish lines. Hindwings grey. Only reliably identified by dissection and microscopic examination of the genitalia. external image

Adults are on wing from late June to early August.

The larvae feed on the seedheads of sea rush (Juncus maritimus) and sharp-pointed rush (Juncus acutus). Larvae can be found from September to May. Pupation takes place in May and June on a plant stem.

== Distribution ==
The moth is found in Tunisia, Ireland, Great Britain, the Netherlands, Germany, Denmark, Sweden, France, Spain, Portugal, Italy, Sardinia, Sicily, Croatia, Albania, Greece, Bulgaria, Crete and Cyprus.
