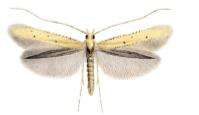

Scientific classification
- Domain: Eukaryota
- Kingdom: Animalia
- Phylum: Arthropoda
- Class: Insecta
- Order: Lepidoptera
- Family: Gracillariidae
- Genus: Caloptilia
- Species: C. roscipennella

Binomial name
- Caloptilia roscipennella (Hübner, 1796)

Synonyms
- Tinea roscipennella Hübner, 1796

= Caloptilia roscipennella =

Species of moth

Caloptilia roscipennella is a moth of the family Gracillariidae. It is known from all of central and southern Europe.

Adults are on wing from August to May and hibernate.

The larvae feed on Juglans regia. They mine the leaves of their host plant. Older larvae leave the mine and live in a leaflet, rolled into a tube. Pupation under a silk membrane in a conical roll at the edge of a leaf.
