= Eupithecia dubiosa =

Scientific classification
- Domain: Eukaryota
- Kingdom: Animalia
- Phylum: Arthropoda
- Class: Insecta
- Order: Lepidoptera
- Family: Geometridae
- Genus: Eupithecia
- Species: E. dubiosa

Binomial name
- Eupithecia dubiosa Dietze, 1910

Species of moth

Eupithecia dubiosa is a moth in the family Geometridae. It is found on Cyprus and in the Levant.

The wingspan is about 17–19 mm.
