= Coleophora salinella =

Scientific classification
- Kingdom: Animalia
- Phylum: Arthropoda
- Class: Insecta
- Order: Lepidoptera
- Family: Coleophoridae
- Genus: Coleophora
- Species: C. salinella

Binomial name
- Coleophora salinella Stainton, 1859

Species of moth

Coleophora salinella is a moth of the family Coleophoridae found in Europe.

== Description ==
The wingspan is 8.5–13 mm.

== Distribution ==
It is found from Great Britain to Ukraine, south to the Iberian Peninsula, Sicily and Cyprus.
