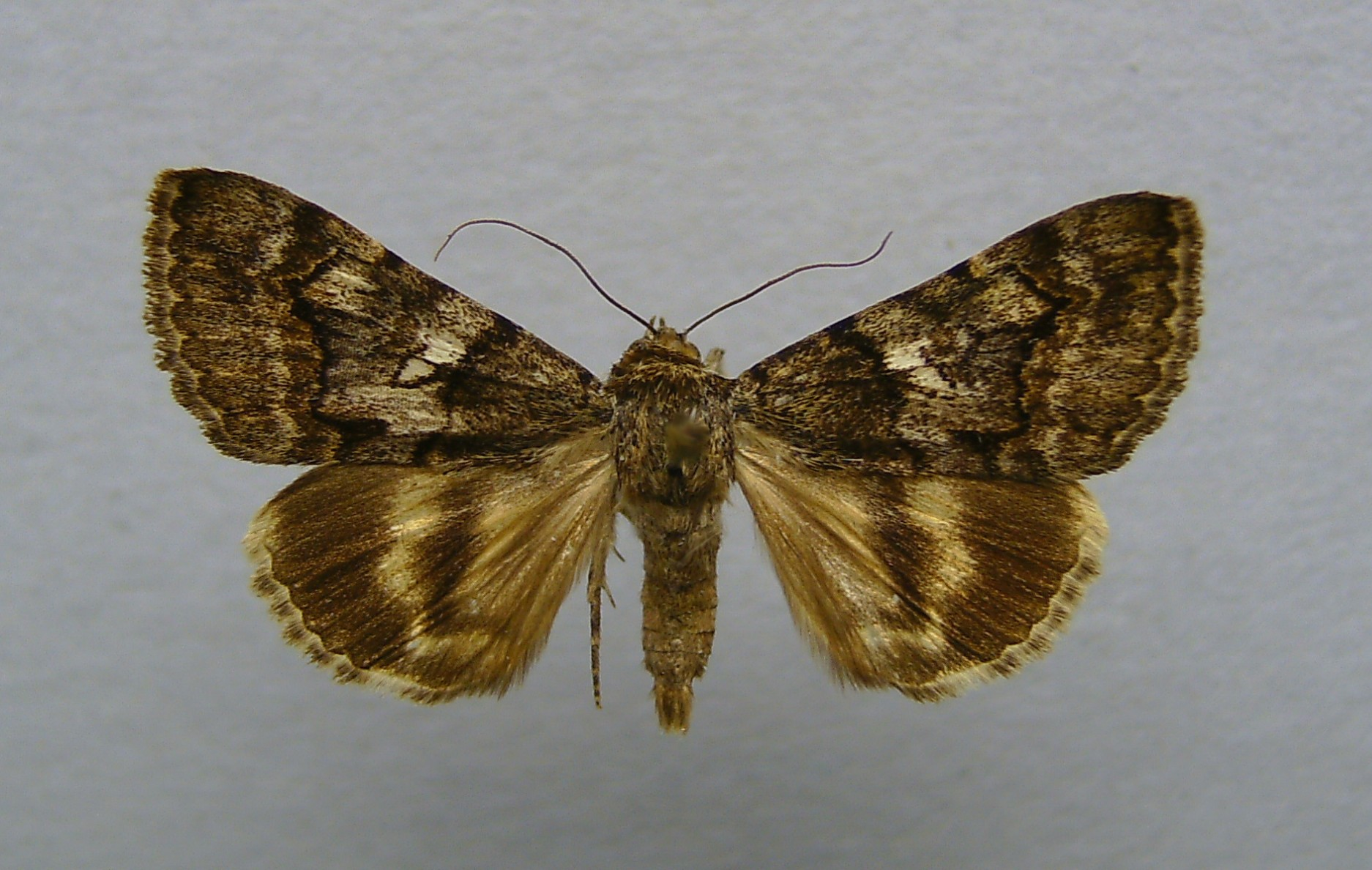

Scientific classification
- Kingdom: Animalia
- Phylum: Arthropoda
- Class: Insecta
- Order: Lepidoptera
- Superfamily: Noctuoidea
- Family: Erebidae
- Genus: Catocala
- Species: C. separata

Binomial name
- Catocala separata Freyer, 1846

Synonyms
- Catocala disjuncta var. fumigata Kuznezov, 1903; Catocala disjuncta var. luctuosa Staudinger. 1901

= Catocala separata =

Species of moth

Catocala separata is a moth of the family Erebidae first described by Christian Friedrich Freyer in 1846. It is found in the Balkans, the Mediterranean part of southern Turkey and the Levant.

There is one generation per year. Adults are on wing from May to July.

The larvae probably feed on Quercus species.
