= Scopula vigilata =

Scientific classification
- Kingdom: Animalia
- Phylum: Arthropoda
- Clade: Pancrustacea
- Class: Insecta
- Order: Lepidoptera
- Family: Geometridae
- Genus: Scopula
- Species: S. vigilata

Binomial name
- Scopula vigilata (Prout, 1913)

Synonyms
- Acidalia turatii Wagner, 1926

Species of geometer moth in subfamily Sterrhinae

Scopula vigilata is a moth of the family Geometridae. It is found on Malta, Sicily, Crete and Cyprus and in Italy, Greece and the Near East.

== Subspecies ==
- Scopula vigilata vigilata
- Scopula vigilata turatii (Wagner, 1926)
