= Coleophora granulosella =

Scientific classification
- Kingdom: Animalia
- Phylum: Arthropoda
- Class: Insecta
- Order: Lepidoptera
- Family: Coleophoridae
- Genus: Coleophora
- Species: C. granulosella

Binomial name
- Coleophora granulosella Staudinger, 1880

Species of moth

Coleophora granulosella is a moth of the family Coleophoridae. It is found on Cyprus and in Asia Minor.
