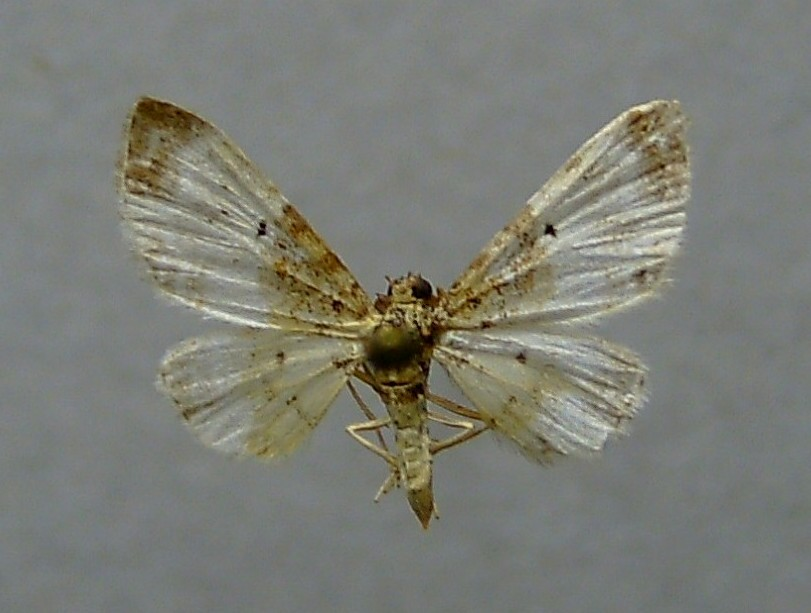

Scientific classification
- Kingdom: Animalia
- Phylum: Arthropoda
- Clade: Pancrustacea
- Class: Insecta
- Order: Lepidoptera
- Family: Geometridae
- Genus: Eupithecia
- Species: E. breviculata

Binomial name
- Eupithecia breviculata (Donzel, 1837)

Synonyms
- Melanthia breviculata Donzel, 1837; Eupithecia anatolica Schwingenschuss, 1939

= Eupithecia breviculata =

Species of moth

Eupithecia breviculata is a moth of the family Geometridae. It is found in the Mediterranean region, Switzerland, Hungary, the Near East and North Africa. It is also found in Iran and Turkmenistan.

The wingspan is 15–20 mm. Adults are on wing from April to June and again from July to August in two generations per year.

The larvae feed on the flowers of Peucedanum and Pimpinella species. The species overwinters in the pupal stage.

== Subspecies ==
- Eupithecia breviculata breviculata
- Eupithecia breviculata georgica Vojnits, 1977
