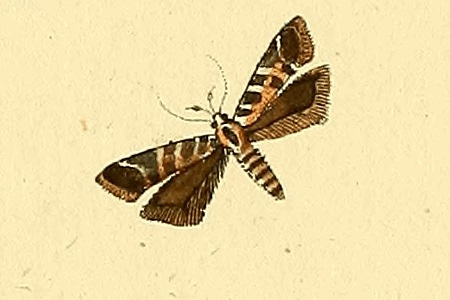

Scientific classification
- Kingdom: Animalia
- Phylum: Arthropoda
- Clade: Pancrustacea
- Class: Insecta
- Order: Lepidoptera
- Family: Gelechiidae
- Genus: Aristotelia
- Species: A. decurtella

Binomial name
- Aristotelia decurtella (Hübner, 1813)

Synonyms
- Tinea decurtella Hübner, 1813; Lampros turbatella Treitschke, 1835; Ergatis amaenella de Joannis, 1891

= Aristotelia decurtella =

Species of moth

Aristotelia decurtella is a moth of the family Gelechiidae. It is found in large parts of Europe, except Ireland, Great Britain, the Netherlands, Portugal, Fennoscandia, the Baltic region, Poland, Ukraine and Romania.

The wingspan is 16–18 mm. Adults are on wing from May to June and again from July to September in two generations per year.

The larvae feed on Sanguisorba officinalis and Eryngium campestre.
