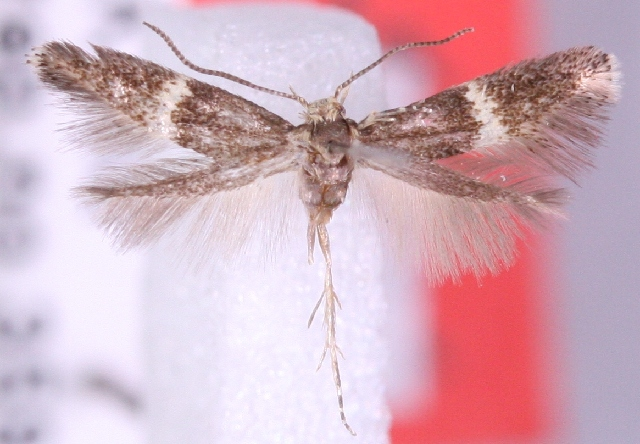

Scientific classification
- Kingdom: Animalia
- Phylum: Arthropoda
- Class: Insecta
- Order: Lepidoptera
- Family: Elachistidae
- Genus: Elachista
- Species: E. sutteri

Binomial name
- Elachista sutteri Kaila, 2002

= Elachista sutteri =

Species of moth

Elachista sutteri is a moth of the family Elachistidae that can be found in Greece and Cyprus.
