= Eupithecia marginata =

Scientific classification
- Domain: Eukaryota
- Kingdom: Animalia
- Phylum: Arthropoda
- Class: Insecta
- Order: Lepidoptera
- Family: Geometridae
- Genus: Eupithecia
- Species: E. marginata

Binomial name
- Eupithecia marginata Staudinger, 1892

Synonyms
- Eupithecia marginita De Laever, 1956

Species of moth

Eupithecia marginata is a moth in the family Geometridae. It is found from Cyprus through the northern Caucasus (Daghestan), Armenia, Azerbaijan, Iran, Afghanistan, Uzbekistan, Tajikistan and Kyrgyzstan to south-eastern Kazakhstan (the Tien-Shan Mountains) and north-western China (Xinjiang).
