= Coleophora alashiae =

Scientific classification
- Kingdom: Animalia
- Phylum: Arthropoda
- Clade: Pancrustacea
- Class: Insecta
- Order: Lepidoptera
- Family: Coleophoridae
- Genus: Coleophora
- Species: C. alashiae

Binomial name
- Coleophora alashiae Baldizzone, 1996

Species of moth

Coleophora alashiae is a moth of the family Coleophoridae. It is found on Cyprus.
