= Coleophora helianthemella =

Scientific classification
- Kingdom: Animalia
- Phylum: Arthropoda
- Class: Insecta
- Order: Lepidoptera
- Family: Coleophoridae
- Genus: Coleophora
- Species: C. helianthemella

Binomial name
- Coleophora helianthemella Milliere, 1870

Synonyms
- Coleophora argyrophlebella Rebel, 1936

Species of moth

Coleophora helianthemella is a moth of the family Coleophoridae. It is found in France, on the Iberian Peninsula and Sardinia, as well as in Italy, Greece and on Cyprus.
