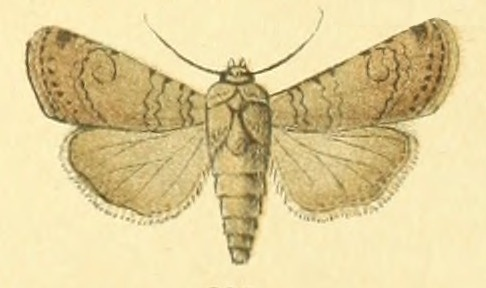

Scientific classification
- Kingdom: Animalia
- Phylum: Arthropoda
- Clade: Pancrustacea
- Class: Insecta
- Order: Lepidoptera
- Superfamily: Noctuoidea
- Family: Noctuidae
- Genus: Euxoa
- Species: E. cos

Binomial name
- Euxoa cos (Hübner, [1824])

Synonyms
- Noctua cos Hübner, [1824]; Agrotis cos var. tephra Boisduval, 1840; Agrotis cos var. vacillans Herrich-Schäffer, [1851]; Agrotis nagyagensis Freyer, 1845; Agrotis cycladum Staudinger, 1870; Agrotis aphe Mabille, 1885

= Euxoa cos =

Species of moth

Euxoa cos is a moth of the family Noctuidae. It is found in southern Europe, the Near East and Middle East.

Adults are on wing in September to October. There is one generation per year.

The larvae feed partly subterraneous on various herbaceous plants.

== Subspecies ==
- Euxoa cos cos
- Euxoa cos crimaea
