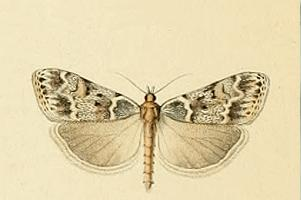

Scientific classification
- Kingdom: Animalia
- Phylum: Arthropoda
- Class: Insecta
- Order: Lepidoptera
- Family: Crambidae
- Genus: Scoparia
- Species: S. staudingeralis

Binomial name
- Scoparia staudingeralis (Mabille, 1869)

Synonyms
- Eudorea staudingeralis Mabille, 1869; Scoparia ingratella var. nevadalis Caradja, 1916; Scoparia perplexella ab. bytinskiella Schawerda in Bytinski-Salz, 1934; Scoparia staudingeralis f. fusculalis Amsel, 1936

= Scoparia staudingeralis =

Species of moth

Scoparia staudingeralis is a species of moth in the family Crambidae. It is found on the Iberian Peninsula, Corsica, Sardinia and in France, Switzerland and Greece, as well as on Crete and Cyprus.
