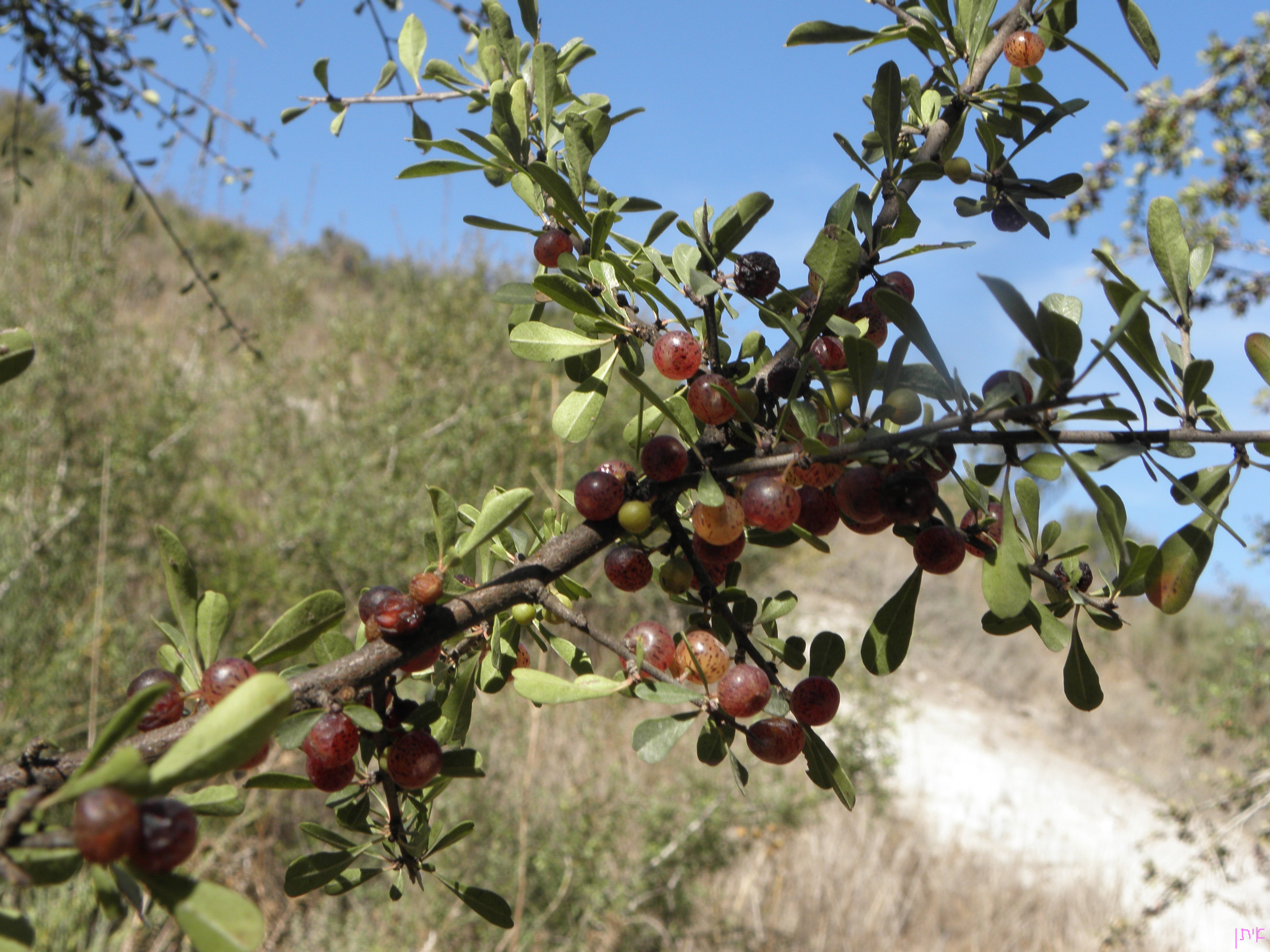
- Mediterranean buckthorn

Scientific classification
- Kingdom: Plantae
- Clade: Tracheophytes
- Clade: Angiosperms
- Clade: Eudicots
- Clade: Rosids
- Order: Rosales
- Family: Rhamnaceae
- Genus: Rhamnus
- Species: R. lycioides

Binomial name
- Rhamnus lycioides L.

= Rhamnus lycioides =

Species of shrub

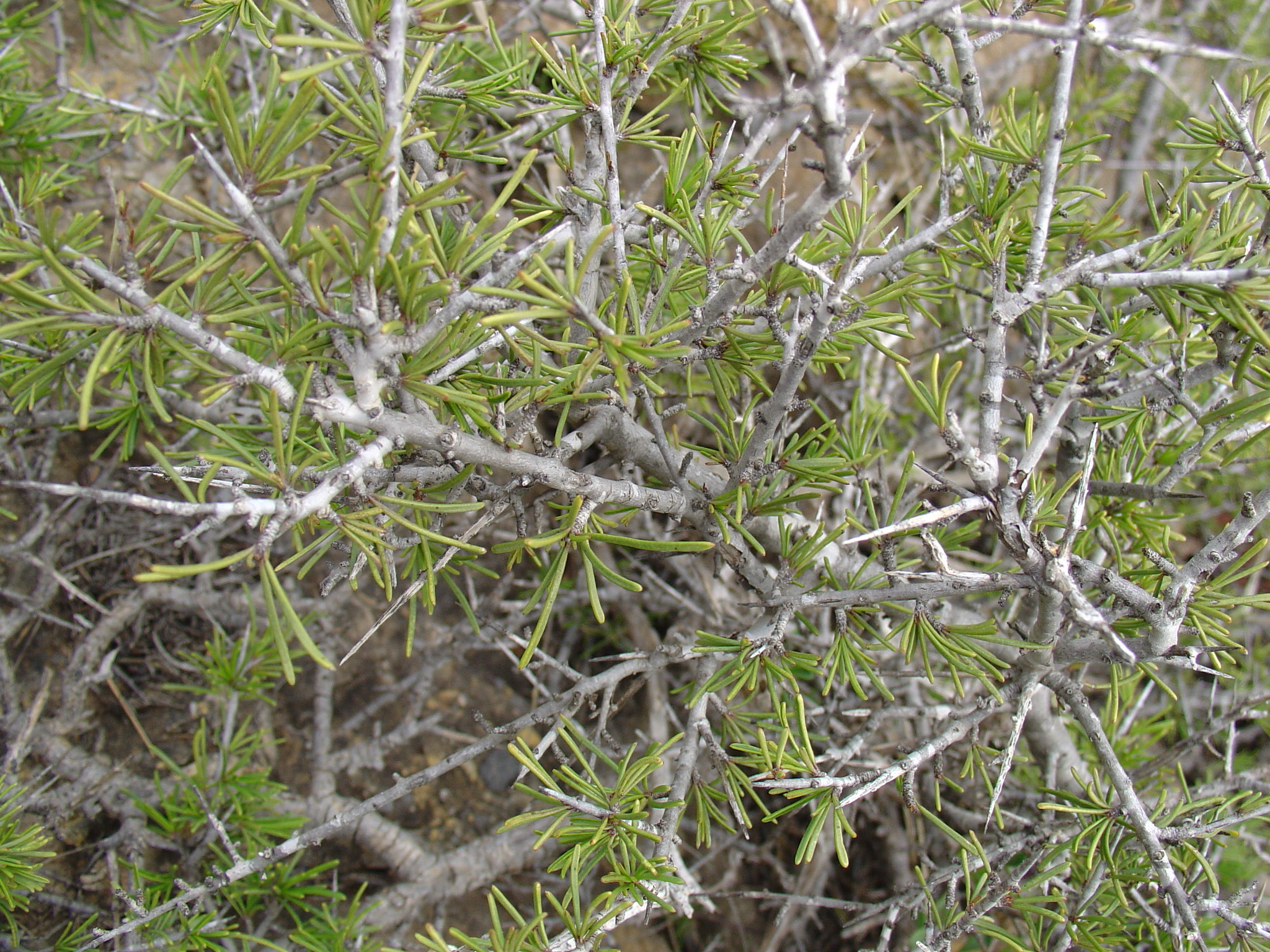
Detail of branches

Rhamnus lycioides, the black hawthorn, European buckthorn, or Mediterranean buckthorn, is a shrub up to about 1.5-4 metres tall in the buckthorn family, Rhamnaceae. It is found in the Mediterranean region, in southern Europe and northern Africa. Its scientific name lycioides refers to its resemblance to the botanical genus Lycium.

== Description ==
Rhamnus lycioides is a slow growth shrub adapted to dry Mediterranean climate. It is a deciduous or evergreen shrub of 1.5–4 meters high with a tangled, thorny, and many-branched form. The bark is grayish, and the young stems are topped with a thorn.

Leaves are light green and, 0.5 to 3.5 centimeters long and 0.3 to 1 inch wide. The tip is obtuse to apiculate. The leaf is entire, linear to obovate, glabrous, narrow and elongated, sometimes slightly broadened towards the apex. They are sometimes leathery and persistent. Lateral nerves have little or no markings on the underside.

The yellow flowers are inconspicuous, standing in groups and appear in the winter. The calyx shows four sharp corners. The flowers are very small, solitary or in small bundles in the axils of the leaves, greenish-yellow with 4 triangular lobes. The petals are rudimentary or nonexistent.

The fruits ovoid, 4-6 millimeters large, yellowish and are beginning to ripen black. The berry is having inside a single seed or more, depending on the subspecies.

It does not bloom and bear fruit at the same time. Several specimens of the same population bear fruit in different months extending the availability of the species as food for birds that disperse their seeds. The berry is purgative, very bitter and in large quantities is toxic to humans.

== Subspecies ==
Five subspecies are recognized:

- Rhamnus lycioides subsp. lycioides
- Rhamnus lycioides subsp. atlantica (Murb.) Jahand. & Maire
- Rhamnus lycioides subsp. borgiae Rivas Mart. & J.M.Pizarro
- Rhamnus lycioides subsp. graeca (Boiss. & Reut.) Tutin
- Rhamnus lycioides subsp. laderoi Rivas Mart. & J.M.Pizarro

== Ecology ==
In the Iberian Peninsula is distributed throughout the central, eastern and south and its natural habitat are the sclerophyllous forest, and woods of pines, oaks, holm oaks and quercus coccifera.

The species is found in the Mediterranean region, particularly in Spain and the Balearic Islands. It also grows on Mediterranean islands and islets, in northern Africa, the Apennine Peninsula and in former Yugoslavia on rocky, nutrient-poor soils.

The plant appears in sclerophyllous forests, scrub, and even solitary in severely degraded drylands as a pioneer species as the species is resilient to overgrazing and trampling by livestock. It is very resistant to drought, preferring calcareous soils. In extremely dry and windy climates, it appears in the rocks. It survives in desert areas with annual rainfall of 200 mm.

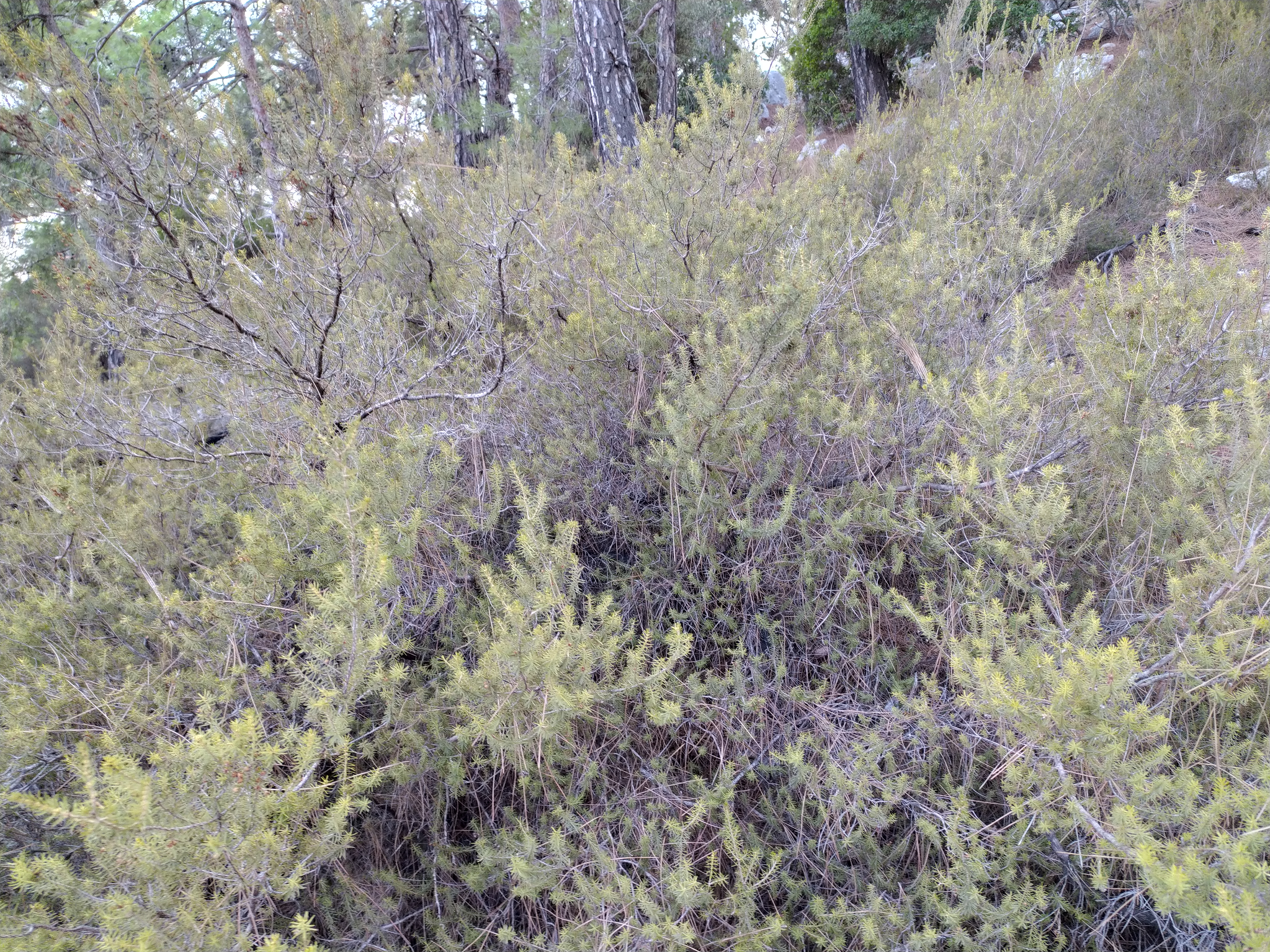
Shrubs of Rhamnus lycioides in Turkey

The plant thrives in dry forests and bushes, under the Kermes oak, the holm oak, Aleppo pine, and juniper. It is a very hardy plant, which occupies poor soils, gritty and highly eroded. Along with the gorse and thistles are the latest species to disappear in overgrazed areas, being of inestimable value to small birds for its fruit and as the protection and support for their nests. The species is very important for desert birds by their fruits with high water content. The fruit can cause death in mammals, but is consumed by ants and birds.
