= Scopula uberaria =

Scientific classification
- Domain: Eukaryota
- Kingdom: Animalia
- Phylum: Arthropoda
- Class: Insecta
- Order: Lepidoptera
- Family: Geometridae
- Genus: Scopula
- Species: S. uberaria

Binomial name
- Scopula uberaria (Zerny, 1933)

Synonyms
- Glossotrophia uberaria Zerny, 1933

Species of geometer moth in subfamily Sterrhinae

Scopula uberaria is a moth of the family Geometridae. It was described by Zerny in 1933. It is found on Cyprus and in the Near East.
