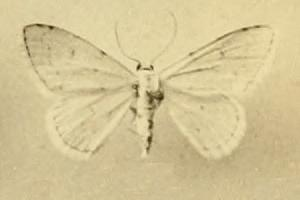

Scientific classification
- Kingdom: Animalia
- Phylum: Arthropoda
- Clade: Pancrustacea
- Class: Insecta
- Order: Lepidoptera
- Family: Geometridae
- Genus: Scopula
- Species: S. sacraria

Binomial name
- Scopula sacraria (Bang-Haas, 1910)

Synonyms
- Acidalia sacraria Bang-Haas, 1910; Glossotrophia fumata Hausmann, 1993

= Scopula sacraria =

Species of geometer moth in subfamily Sterrhinae

Scopula sacraria is a moth of the family Geometridae. It is found on Cyprus and the European part of Russia.

The wingspan is about 20–23 millimetres (0.79–0.91 in).

== Subspecies ==
- Scopula sacraria sacraria
- Scopula sacraria fumata (Hausmann, 1993) (Cyprus)
