= Albula =

Albula may refer to:

== Places ==
- Albula, an old (possibly legendary) name of the Tiber river

=== Switzerland ===
- Albula Range, a mountain range
- Albula (river), a tributary of the Hinterrhein
- Albula District, a district in canton Graubünden until 2017
  - Albula/Alvra, a municipality
- Albula Pass
- Albula Railway, part of the Rhaetian Railway
- Albula Region, which replaced Albula District in 2017
- Albula Tunnel, located on the Albula Railway

== Zoology ==
=== Moths ===
- Agrisius albula, a moth of family Erebidae
- Dichomeris albula, a moth of family Gelechiidae
- Machimia albula, a moth of family Oecophoridae
- Meganola albula, a moth of family Nolidae
- Metasia albula, a moth of family Crambidae
- Nevadopalpa albula, a moth of family Gelechiidae
- Nodozana albula, a moth of family Erebidae
- Spodoptera albula, a moth of family Noctuidae

=== Other species ===
- Albula (fish), a genus of ray-finned fish
- Coregonus albula, a whitefish of family Salmonidae
- Eurema albula, a butterfly of family Pieridae
- Hastula albula, a sea snail of family Terebridae
- Menestho albula, a sea snail of family Pyramidellidae
- Phaeopate albula, a beetle of family Cerambycidae
- Stephanasterias albula, a starfish of family Asteriidae
