= Triple Crossed =

Triple Crossed may refer to:

- Triple Crossed (1959 film), a short subject starring the Three Stooges
- Triple Crossed (2013 film), a mystery-thriller film

== See also ==
- Triple Cross (disambiguation)
