= X3 =

X3 may refer to:

== Arts, entertainment, and media ==
=== Films ===
- X-Men: The Last Stand, also known as X3 and X-Men 3, the third film in the comic book film series
- XXX: Return of Xander Cage, a 2017 American film directed by D. J. Caruso

=== Literature and publications ===
- X3, a collection of three science fiction novellas by Gary A. Braunbeck

=== Music ===
- X3 (group), a short-lived Australian girl group, circa 2000
- X3 (album), a 2004 solo album by Japanese pop singer Aya Matsuura

=== Video games ===
- X-Men: The Official Game, a 2006 videogame prequel to X-Men: The Last Stand
- X³: Reunion, a space simulation computer game
  - X³: Terran Conflict, a sequel to X³: Reunion
    - X³: Albion Prelude, an addon to X³: Terran Conflict
- Dance Dance Revolution X3, a 2011 music video game by Konami
- Mega Man X3, a 1995 platforming game in Capcom's Mega Man X series

== Electronics ==
=== Instruments ===
- Korg X3, a synthesizer

=== Phones ===
- Kyocera X3, an Android One smartphone by Kyocera
- Mobile phone models by Nokia
  - Nokia X3-00 or Nokia X3
  - Nokia X3 Touch and Type or Nokia X3-02

=== Sensors ===
- Foveon X3 sensor, a layered image sensor design

== Mathematics, science, and technology ==
=== Astronomy ===
- Cygnus X-3, a binary x-ray source in the sky

=== Computer science ===
- X3, one former name of a subcommittee of ANSI, now International Committee for Information Technology Standards (INCITS)
- X3 (code) aka Excess-3, a binary code also termed Stibitz code
- XKO X3, an ERP software

=== Mathematics ===
- X^{3}, the mathematical cubic function

== Transportation ==
=== Aircraft ===
- Douglas X-3 Stiletto, an experimental jet aircraft
- Eurocopter X3, an experimental compound helicopter

=== Automobiles ===
- Beijing X3, a Chinese subcompact crossover SUV
- BMW X3, a German compact SUV
- Cowin X3, a Chinese compact SUV
- Geely Vision X3, a Chinese subcompact crossover
- Jingyi X3, a Chinese subcompact crossover

=== Bus routes ===
- X3 (New York City bus)
- X3, a Metrobus route in Washington, D.C. U.S.

=== IATA codes ===
- TUI fly Deutschland (IATA airline designator X3 since 2007)
- Hapag-Lloyd Express (IATA airline designator X3, 2002-2007)

=== Motorcycles ===
- Ilmor X3 (also termed the X³), a MotoGP race motorbike

=== Spacecraft ===
- X-3, the Prospero (satellite) launched by the UK in 1971

=== Trains ===
- X3 (train), a Swedish train built by Alstom

=== Watercraft ===
- HMS X3, an X-class submarine of the Royal Navy

== See also ==
- 3X (disambiguation)
