= Metasia gigantalis =

Scientific classification
- Domain: Eukaryota
- Kingdom: Animalia
- Phylum: Arthropoda
- Class: Insecta
- Order: Lepidoptera
- Family: Crambidae
- Subfamily: Spilomelinae
- Genus: Metasia
- Species: M. gigantalis

Binomial name
- Metasia gigantalis Staudinger, 1871

Species of moth

Metasia gigantalis is a species of moth in the family Crambidae. It is found in Greece, the Republic of Macedonia and on Cyprus, Crete and Sicily.

== Taxonomy ==
The species was formerly treated as a synonym of Metasia carnealis, but was reinstated as a valid species in 2013.
