= XXX =

XXX may refer to:

== Arts and entertainment ==
=== Film and television ===
- XXX (film series), American action film series
  - XXX (2002 film), an action film starring Vin Diesel
  - XXX: State of the Union, 2005
  - XXX: Return of Xander Cage, 2017
- XXX (web series), a 2018 Hindi erotic drama
- XXX: Exklusibong, Explosibong, Exposé, a Philippine current affairs television show
- Death to the Daleks (production code: XXX), a 1974 Doctor Who serial
- Anya Amasova or Agent XXX, a character in the James Bond film The Spy Who Loved Me

=== Music ===
==== Albums ====
- XXX (Asia album), 2012
- XXX (Danny Brown album), 2011
- XXX (Jimmy Edgar album), 2010
- XXX (ZZ Top album), 1999
- XXX, 1987, by Miguel Bosé
- XXX (soundtrack), soundtrack to the 2002 film
- Chicago XXX, 2006, by Chicago
- XXX (EP), by Pussy Riot

==== Songs ====
- "X X X" (L'Arc-en-Ciel song), 2011
- "XXX" (Kendrick Lamar song), 2017
- "XXX", by The Bohicas, 2014
- "XXX", by Kim Petras from Slut Pop, 2022

==== Other uses in music ====
- XXX (group), a South Korean hip hop music group
- XXX Tour, supporting the ZZ Top album

=== Video games ===
- BMX XXX, a 2002 action sports game featuring adult humor
- XXX (video game), a 2002 action game based on the film of the same name
- XXX, a padding prefix or suffix in gaming; see Glossary of video game terms

== Military ==
- XXX Corps (United Kingdom), a corps of the British Army during the Second World War
- XXX Corps (Pakistan), a corps of the Pakistan Army
- XXX, the squadron markings of No. 29 Squadron RAF

== Science and technology ==
- 30 (number) (Roman numeral XXX)
- XXX syndrome or Trisomy X, a chromosomal disorder
- .xxx, an internet top-level domain intended for pornographic sites
- XXX (tag), a possible tag in a comment in programming
- XXX model, a variant of the quantum Heisenberg model of magnetic ordering
- XXX, the ISO 9362 (SWIFT/BIC) branch subcode for "primary office"
- XXX, "unspecified nationality" on a machine-readable passport

== People ==
- XXXTentacion (1998–2018), American rapper, singer-songwriter and record producer
- Chinu Xxx (born 1987), British freestyle wrestler

== Other uses ==
- Pornography (XXX)
- XXX, an X rating of films
- Straight edge lifestyle (symbolized by "XXX")
- XXX, an urgency code used with SOS
- XXX (beer), marks in beer measurement
- XXX (currency), the ISO 4217 code for "no currency"
- XXX, a feature of the coat of arms of Amsterdam
  - Flag of Amsterdam
- Electrolux Model XXX (Model 30), a vacuum cleaner manufactured by Aerus

== See also ==
- 3X (disambiguation)
- 30 (disambiguation), decimal representation of the Roman numeral XXX
- Kiss
- Triple Cross (disambiguation)
- Triple X (disambiguation)
- Triplex (disambiguation)
- XXL (disambiguation)
