= Metasia annuliferalis =

Scientific classification
- Kingdom: Animalia
- Phylum: Arthropoda
- Class: Insecta
- Order: Lepidoptera
- Family: Crambidae
- Subfamily: Spilomelinae
- Genus: Metasia
- Species: M. annuliferalis

Binomial name
- Metasia annuliferalis Hampson, 1903

Species of moth

Metasia annuliferalis is a moth in the family Crambidae. It was described by George Hampson in 1903. It is found in Tamil Nadu, India.
