= Metasia tumidalis =

Scientific classification
- Kingdom: Animalia
- Phylum: Arthropoda
- Class: Insecta
- Order: Lepidoptera
- Family: Crambidae
- Subfamily: Spilomelinae
- Genus: Metasia
- Species: M. tumidalis

Binomial name
- Metasia tumidalis Hampson, 1913

Species of moth

Metasia tumidalis is a moth in the family Crambidae. It was described by George Hampson in 1913. It is found on New Guinea.
