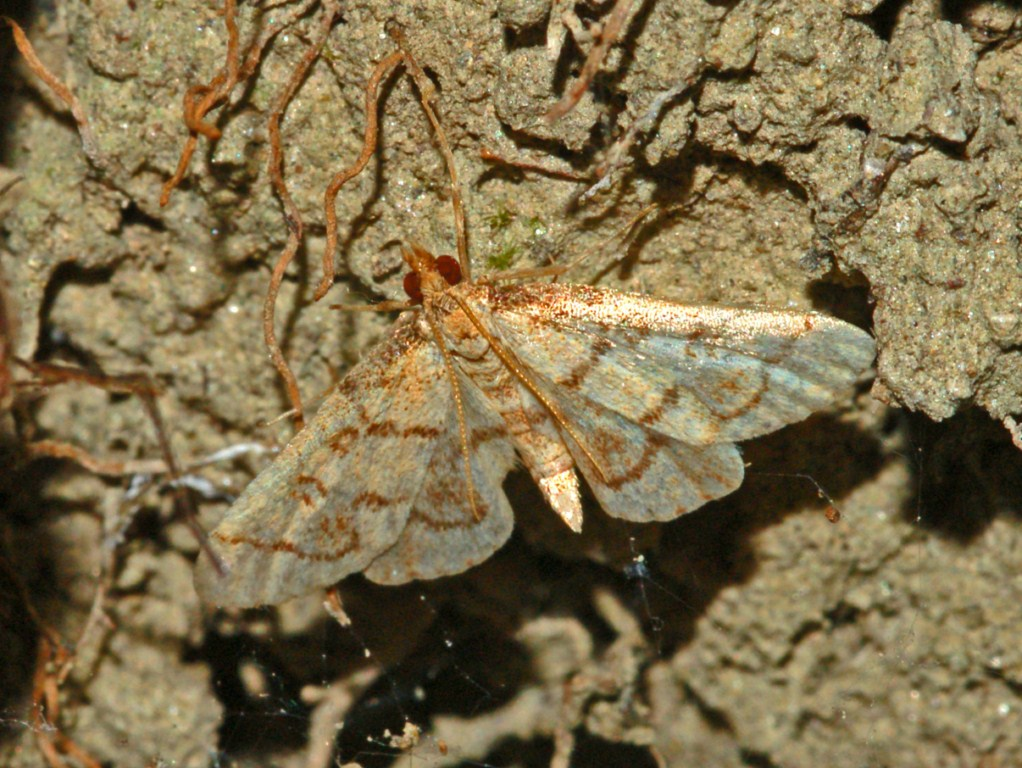

Scientific classification
- Kingdom: Animalia
- Phylum: Arthropoda
- Class: Insecta
- Order: Lepidoptera
- Family: Crambidae
- Subfamily: Spilomelinae
- Genus: Metasia
- Species: M. ophialis

Binomial name
- Metasia ophialis (Treitschke, 1829)

Synonyms
- Botys ophialis Treitschke, 1829; Metasia ophialis legrandi Leraut, 2001; Metasia ophialis ab. thanatella Schawerda, 1913

= Metasia ophialis =

Species of moth

Metasia ophialis is a species of moth of the family Crambidae.

== Distribution ==
This species can be found in Central and Southern Europe (Albania, Austria, Bosnia and Herzegovina, Bulgaria, Croatia, Czech Republic, France, Greece, Hungary, Italy, North Macedonia, Romania, Slovakia, Spain, Switzerland and Yugoslavia).

== Description ==
Metasia ophialis can reach a wingspan of 14–17 mm (0.55–0.67 in). Wings are whitish, with irregular transversal brown lines.

This species is rather similar to Dolicharthria bruguieralis.

== Biology ==
Adults are on wing from June to September depending on the location.
