= Metasia chionostigma =

Scientific classification
- Domain: Eukaryota
- Kingdom: Animalia
- Phylum: Arthropoda
- Class: Insecta
- Order: Lepidoptera
- Family: Crambidae
- Subfamily: Spilomelinae
- Genus: Metasia
- Species: M. chionostigma

Binomial name
- Metasia chionostigma J. F. G. Clarke, 1971

Species of moth

Metasia chionostigma is a moth in the family Crambidae. It was described by John Frederick Gates Clarke in 1971. It is found in French Polynesia, where it has been recorded from the island of Rapa Iti.
