= Metasia hodiusalis =

Scientific classification
- Kingdom: Animalia
- Phylum: Arthropoda
- Class: Insecta
- Order: Lepidoptera
- Family: Crambidae
- Subfamily: Spilomelinae
- Genus: Metasia
- Species: M. hodiusalis

Binomial name
- Metasia hodiusalis (Walker, 1859)

Synonyms
- Botys hodiusalis Walker, 1859; Botys medialis Walker, 1866

Species of moth

Metasia hodiusalis is a moth in the family Crambidae. It was described by Francis Walker in 1859. It is found on Borneo and in New Guinea.
