= Metasia subtilialis =

Scientific classification
- Domain: Eukaryota
- Kingdom: Animalia
- Phylum: Arthropoda
- Class: Insecta
- Order: Lepidoptera
- Family: Crambidae
- Subfamily: Spilomelinae
- Genus: Metasia
- Species: M. subtilialis

Binomial name
- Metasia subtilialis Caradja, 1916

Species of moth

Metasia subtilialis is a moth in the family Crambidae. It was described by Aristide Caradja in 1916. It is found in Turkey.
