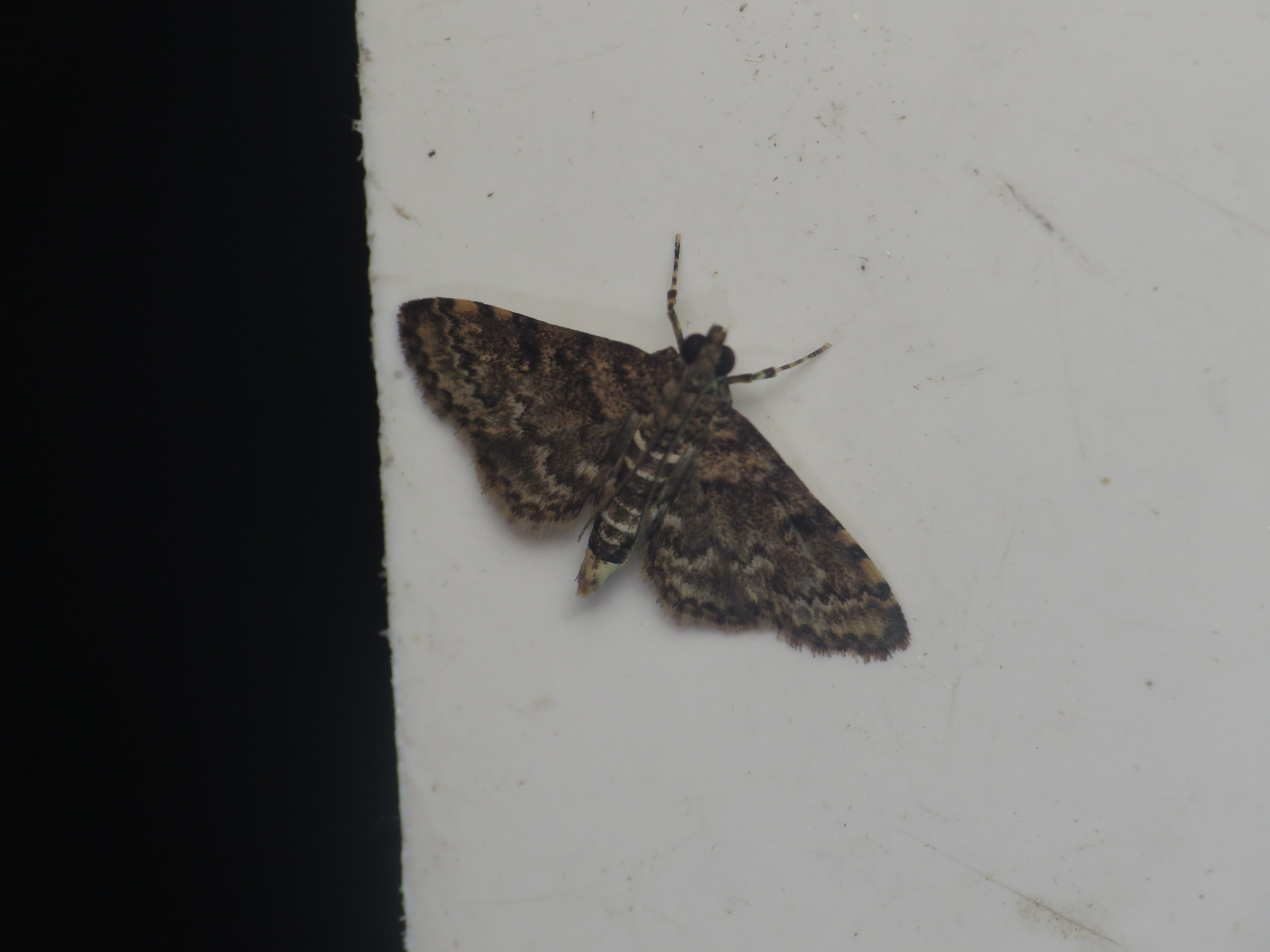

Scientific classification
- Domain: Eukaryota
- Kingdom: Animalia
- Phylum: Arthropoda
- Class: Insecta
- Order: Lepidoptera
- Family: Crambidae
- Subfamily: Spilomelinae
- Genus: Metasia
- Species: M. spilocrossa

Binomial name
- Metasia spilocrossa (Turner, 1913)

Synonyms
- Sylepta spilocrossa Turner, 1913

= Metasia spilocrossa =

Species of moth

Metasia spilocrossa is a moth in the family Crambidae. It was described by Alfred Jefferis Turner in 1913. It is found in Australia, where it has been recorded from Queensland.

The wingspan is about 20 mm. The forewings are whitish, suffused with brownish fuscous and with dark-fuscous markings. The hindwings are as the forewings but without a discal mark.
