= Metasia pharisalis =

Scientific classification
- Kingdom: Animalia
- Phylum: Arthropoda
- Class: Insecta
- Order: Lepidoptera
- Family: Crambidae
- Subfamily: Spilomelinae
- Genus: Metasia
- Species: M. pharisalis

Binomial name
- Metasia pharisalis (Walker, 1859)

Synonyms
- Botys pharisalis Walker, 1859; Scopula segestusalis Walker, 1859

Species of moth

Metasia pharisalis is a moth in the family Crambidae. It was described by Francis Walker in 1859. It is found in Australia, where it has been recorded from Queensland.
