= Metasia alvandalis =

Scientific classification
- Domain: Eukaryota
- Kingdom: Animalia
- Phylum: Arthropoda
- Class: Insecta
- Order: Lepidoptera
- Family: Crambidae
- Genus: Metasia
- Species: M. alvandalis

Binomial name
- Metasia alvandalis Amsel, 1961

Species of moth

Metasia alvandalis is a moth in the family Crambidae. It was described by Hans Georg Amsel in 1961 and is found in Iran.
