= Metasia hilarodes =

Scientific classification
- Domain: Eukaryota
- Kingdom: Animalia
- Phylum: Arthropoda
- Class: Insecta
- Order: Lepidoptera
- Family: Crambidae
- Subfamily: Spilomelinae
- Genus: Metasia
- Species: M. hilarodes

Binomial name
- Metasia hilarodes Meyrick, 1894

Species of moth

Metasia hilarodes is a moth in the family Crambidae. It was described by Edward Meyrick in 1894. It is found on Borneo.

The wingspan is about 20 mm. The forewings are yellow ochreous with fuscous lines. The first is indistinct and the second is black dotted on the costa, followed by three semi-transparent whitish dots on the upper third and abruptly curved outwards on the middle third, thence strongly broken inwards and obsolete to beneath the middle of the disc, where it is continued to the inner margin. There is a fuscous discal mark, preceded by a quadrate semi-transparent whitish spot, beneath which is another similar anteriorly dark-edged spot preceding the second line. There are three dark fuscous dots on the costa posteriorly. The hindwings are ochreous yellow and the second line is as in the forewings, but without whitish spots.
