= Metasia ossealis =

Scientific classification
- Domain: Eukaryota
- Kingdom: Animalia
- Phylum: Arthropoda
- Class: Insecta
- Order: Lepidoptera
- Family: Crambidae
- Subfamily: Spilomelinae
- Genus: Metasia
- Species: M. ossealis

Binomial name
- Metasia ossealis Staudinger, 1879

Species of moth

Metasia ossealis is a moth in the family Crambidae. It was described by Staudinger in 1879. It is found in Turkey.

== Taxonomy ==
It was resurrected from synonymy with Palepicorsia ustrinalis in 2001.
