= Metasia angustipennis =

Scientific classification
- Kingdom: Animalia
- Phylum: Arthropoda
- Class: Insecta
- Order: Lepidoptera
- Family: Crambidae
- Subfamily: Spilomelinae
- Genus: Metasia
- Species: M. angustipennis

Binomial name
- Metasia angustipennis Rothschild, 1921

Species of moth

Metasia angustipennis is a moth in the family Crambidae. It was described by Rothschild in 1921. It is found in Niger.
