= Metasia parallelalis =

Scientific classification
- Domain: Eukaryota
- Kingdom: Animalia
- Phylum: Arthropoda
- Class: Insecta
- Order: Lepidoptera
- Family: Crambidae
- Subfamily: Spilomelinae
- Genus: Metasia
- Species: M. parallelalis

Binomial name
- Metasia parallelalis Rothschild, 1921

Species of moth

Metasia parallelalis is a moth in the family Crambidae, found in Niger. It was described by Rothschild in 1921.
