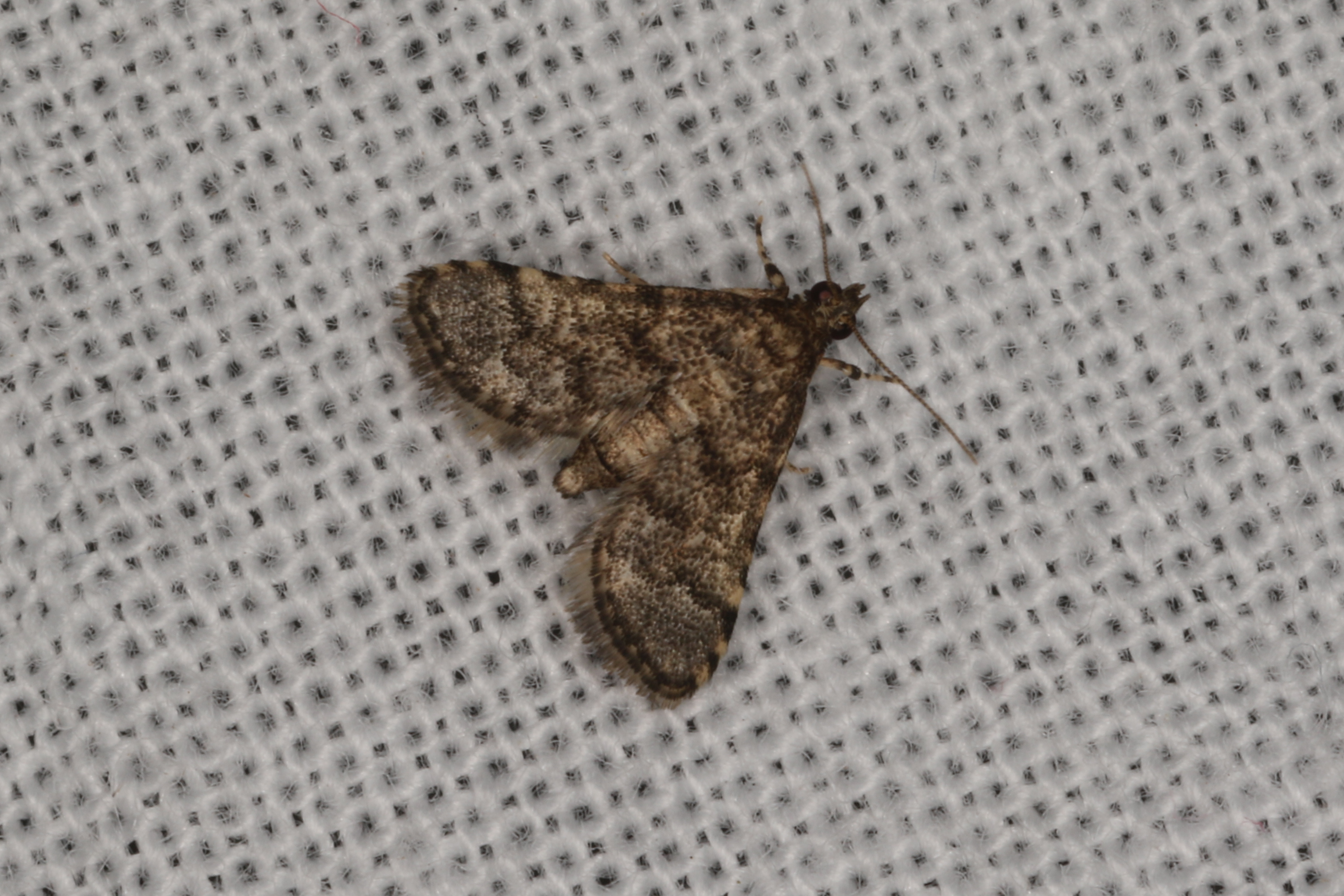
- Smithfield Regional Park, near James Cook University, Cairns, Australia

Scientific classification
- Kingdom: Animalia
- Phylum: Arthropoda
- Class: Insecta
- Order: Lepidoptera
- Family: Crambidae
- Subfamily: Spilomelinae
- Genus: Metasia
- Species: M. acharis

Binomial name
- Metasia acharis Meyrick, 1889

= Metasia acharis =

Species of moth

Metasia acharis is a moth in the family Crambidae. It was described by Edward Meyrick in 1889. It is found on New Guinea and Australia, where it has been recorded from Queensland.

The wingspan is about 15 mm. The wings are pale brown with a pattern of dark brown zigzag lines.
