= Metasia parvalis =

Scientific classification
- Domain: Eukaryota
- Kingdom: Animalia
- Phylum: Arthropoda
- Class: Insecta
- Order: Lepidoptera
- Family: Crambidae
- Subfamily: Spilomelinae
- Genus: Metasia
- Species: M. parvalis

Binomial name
- Metasia parvalis Caradja, 1916

Species of moth

Metasia parvalis is a moth in the family Crambidae. It was described by Aristide Caradja in 1916. It is found in Turkey and on Cyprus.

== Subspecies ==
- Metasia parvalis parvalis
- Metasia parvalis cypriusella Slamka, 2013 (Cyprus)
