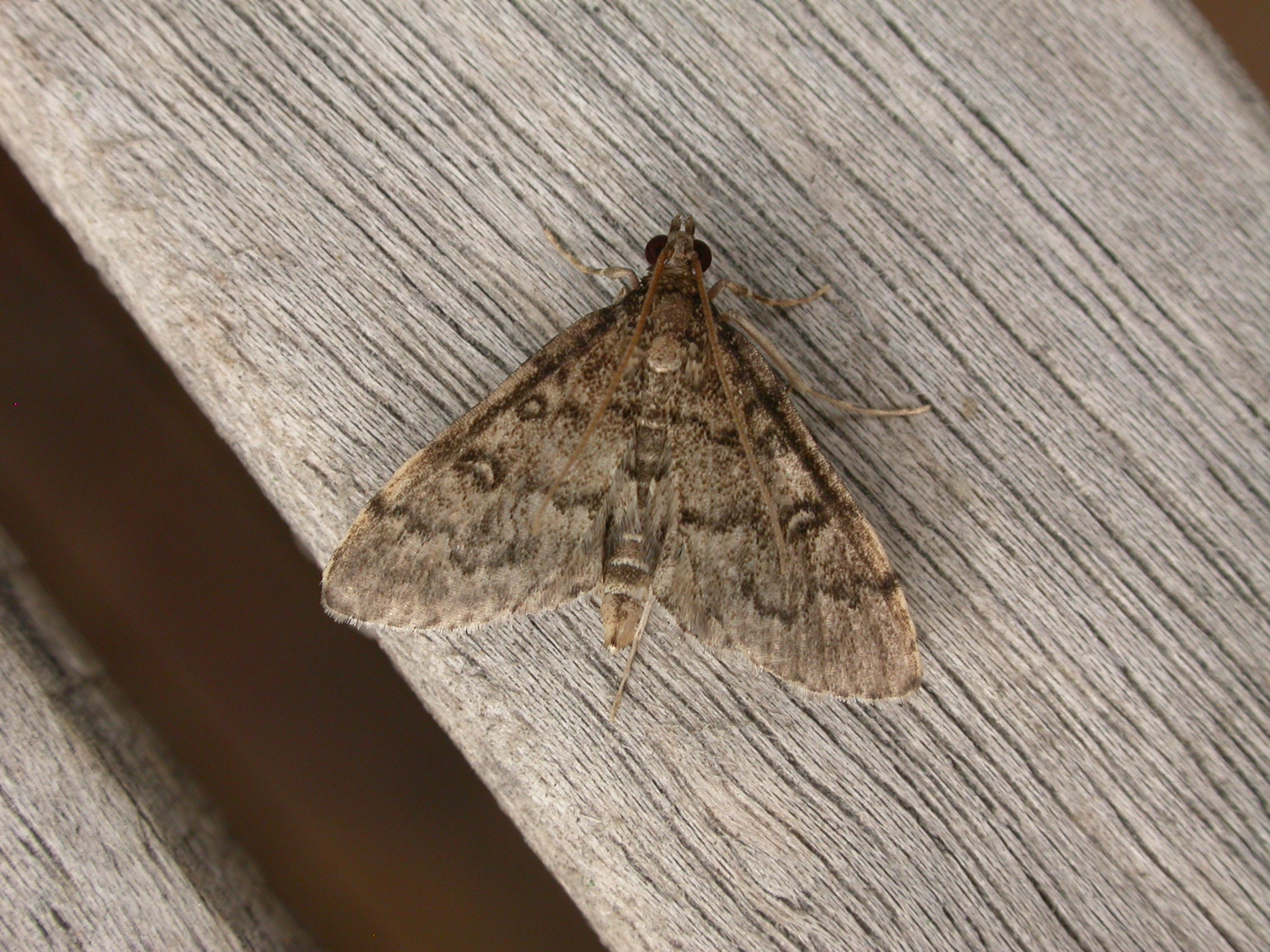

Scientific classification
- Kingdom: Animalia
- Phylum: Arthropoda
- Class: Insecta
- Order: Lepidoptera
- Family: Crambidae
- Subfamily: Spilomelinae
- Genus: Metasia
- Species: M. liophaea

Binomial name
- Metasia liophaea (Meyrick, 1887)

Synonyms
- Eurycreon liophaea Meyrick, 1887

= Metasia liophaea =

Species of moth

Metasia liophaea is a species of moth of the family Crambidae. It is found in Australia, where it has been recorded from New South Wales and the Australian Capital Territory.

Adults have fawn forewings with a faint pattern of zigzag lines and spots.
