= Metasia straminealis =

Scientific classification
- Kingdom: Animalia
- Phylum: Arthropoda
- Class: Insecta
- Order: Lepidoptera
- Family: Crambidae
- Subfamily: Spilomelinae
- Genus: Metasia
- Species: M. straminealis

Binomial name
- Metasia straminealis Hampson, 1903

Species of moth

Metasia straminealis is a moth in the family Crambidae. It was described by George Hampson in 1903. It is found in the Nilgiri Mountains of India.
