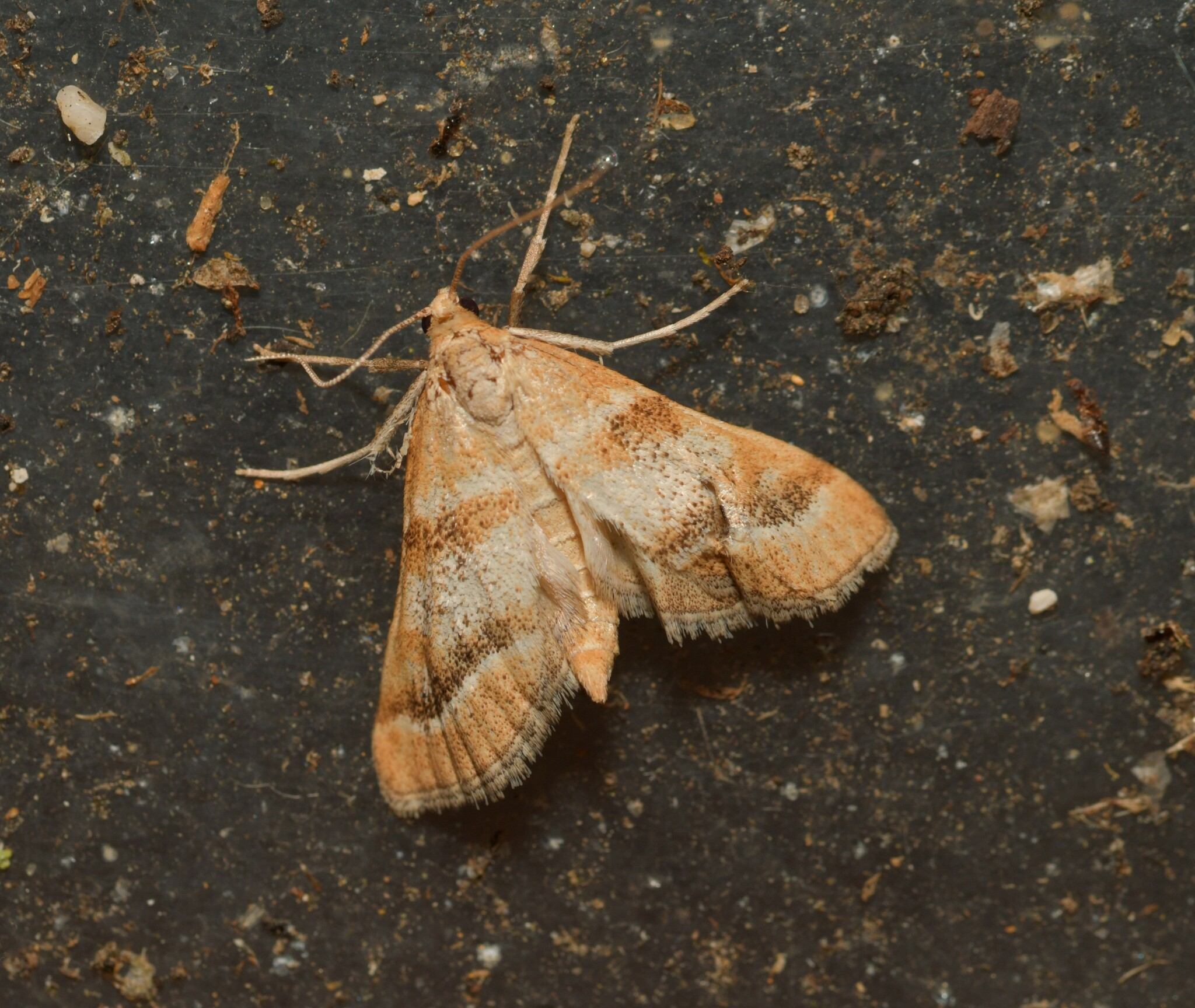
- Metasia suppandalis, Portugal

Scientific classification
- Kingdom: Animalia
- Phylum: Arthropoda
- Clade: Pancrustacea
- Class: Insecta
- Order: Lepidoptera
- Family: Crambidae
- Subfamily: Spilomelinae
- Genus: Metasia
- Species: M. suppandalis

Binomial name
- Metasia suppandalis (Hubner, 1823)

Synonyms
- Pyralis suppandalis Hubner, 1823

= Metasia suppandalis =

Species of moth

Metasia suppandalis is a species of crambid snout moth in the family Crambidae. It is found in southern Europe, North Africa, and southwestern Asia.
