= Metasia ochrochoa =

Scientific classification
- Kingdom: Animalia
- Phylum: Arthropoda
- Class: Insecta
- Order: Lepidoptera
- Family: Crambidae
- Subfamily: Spilomelinae
- Genus: Metasia
- Species: M. ochrochoa

Binomial name
- Metasia ochrochoa (Meyrick, 1887)

Synonyms
- Eurycreon ochrochoa Meyrick, 1887; Metasia galbina Turner, 1913

Species of moth

Metasia ochrochoa is a moth in the family Crambidae. It was described by Edward Meyrick in 1887. It is found in Australia, where it has been recorded from Queensland, the Northern Territory and New South Wales.

The wingspan is about 18 mm. The forewings are light yellow ochreous, in females irrorated (speckled) with pale red brownish. The lines are cloudy dark fuscous. The first runs from the inner margin at two-fifths, becoming obsolete towards the costa and the second is slightly waved and runs from three-fourths of the costa to the inner margin at two-thirds. There is a small roundish discal spot obscurely outlined with red brownish. The hindwings have the same ground colour and markings as the forewings.
