= Metasia orphnopis =

Scientific classification
- Domain: Eukaryota
- Kingdom: Animalia
- Phylum: Arthropoda
- Class: Insecta
- Order: Lepidoptera
- Family: Crambidae
- Subfamily: Spilomelinae
- Genus: Metasia
- Species: M. orphnopis

Binomial name
- Metasia orphnopis Turner, 1915

Species of moth

Metasia orphnopis is a moth in the family Crambidae. It was described by Turner in 1915. It is found in Australia, where it has been recorded from Queensland.

The wingspan is about 20 mm. The forewings are fuscous with dark-fuscous lines. The hindwings are as the forewings, but with a curved antemedian line.
