= Metasia bilineatella =

Scientific classification
- Kingdom: Animalia
- Phylum: Arthropoda
- Class: Insecta
- Order: Lepidoptera
- Family: Crambidae
- Subfamily: Spilomelinae
- Genus: Metasia
- Species: M. bilineatella

Binomial name
- Metasia bilineatella Inoue, 1996

Species of moth

Metasia bilineatella is a moth in the family Crambidae. It was described by Hiroshi Inoue in 1996. It is found in Japan, where it has been recorded from Ogasawara Islands.
