= Metasia inustalis =

Scientific classification
- Domain: Eukaryota
- Kingdom: Animalia
- Phylum: Arthropoda
- Class: Insecta
- Order: Lepidoptera
- Family: Crambidae
- Subfamily: Spilomelinae
- Genus: Metasia
- Species: M. inustalis

Binomial name
- Metasia inustalis Ragonot, 1894

Synonyms
- Metasia continualis Amsel, 1961; Metasia pseudocontinualis Amsel, 1961

Species of moth

Metasia inustalis is a moth in the family Crambidae. It was described by Ragonot in 1894. It is found in Turkey, Iraq and Iran.
