= Metasia zophophanes =

Scientific classification
- Domain: Eukaryota
- Kingdom: Animalia
- Phylum: Arthropoda
- Class: Insecta
- Order: Lepidoptera
- Family: Crambidae
- Subfamily: Spilomelinae
- Genus: Metasia
- Species: M. zophophanes

Binomial name
- Metasia zophophanes (Turner, 1937)

Synonyms
- Bocchoris zophophanes Turner, 1937

Species of moth

Metasia zophophanes is a moth in the family Crambidae. It was described by Turner in 1937. It is found in Australia, where it has been recorded from Queensland.
