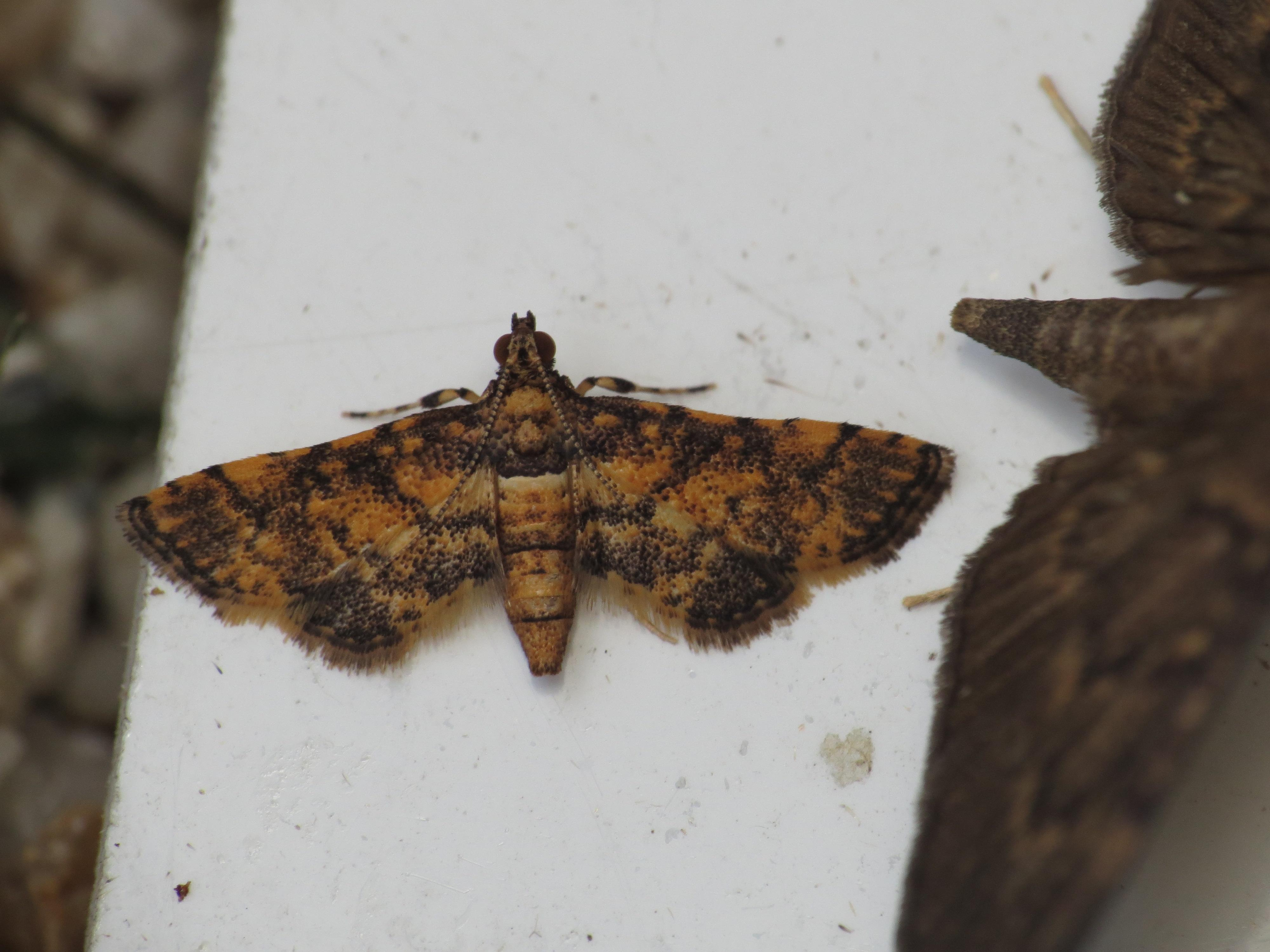

Scientific classification
- Kingdom: Animalia
- Phylum: Arthropoda
- Class: Insecta
- Order: Lepidoptera
- Family: Crambidae
- Subfamily: Spilomelinae
- Genus: Metasia
- Species: M. tiasalis

Binomial name
- Metasia tiasalis (Walker, 1859)

Synonyms
- Botys tiasalis Walker, 1859; Asopia microchrysalis Walker, 1866; Lamprosema truncitornalis Hampson, 1918

= Metasia tiasalis =

Species of moth

Metasia tiasalis is a species of moth of the family Crambidae.

== Distribution ==
It was described from Sri Lanka, but has also been recorded from Australia (including Queensland).

== Description ==
It is a micro moths with a wingspan of 1.5 cm (0.39 inch).

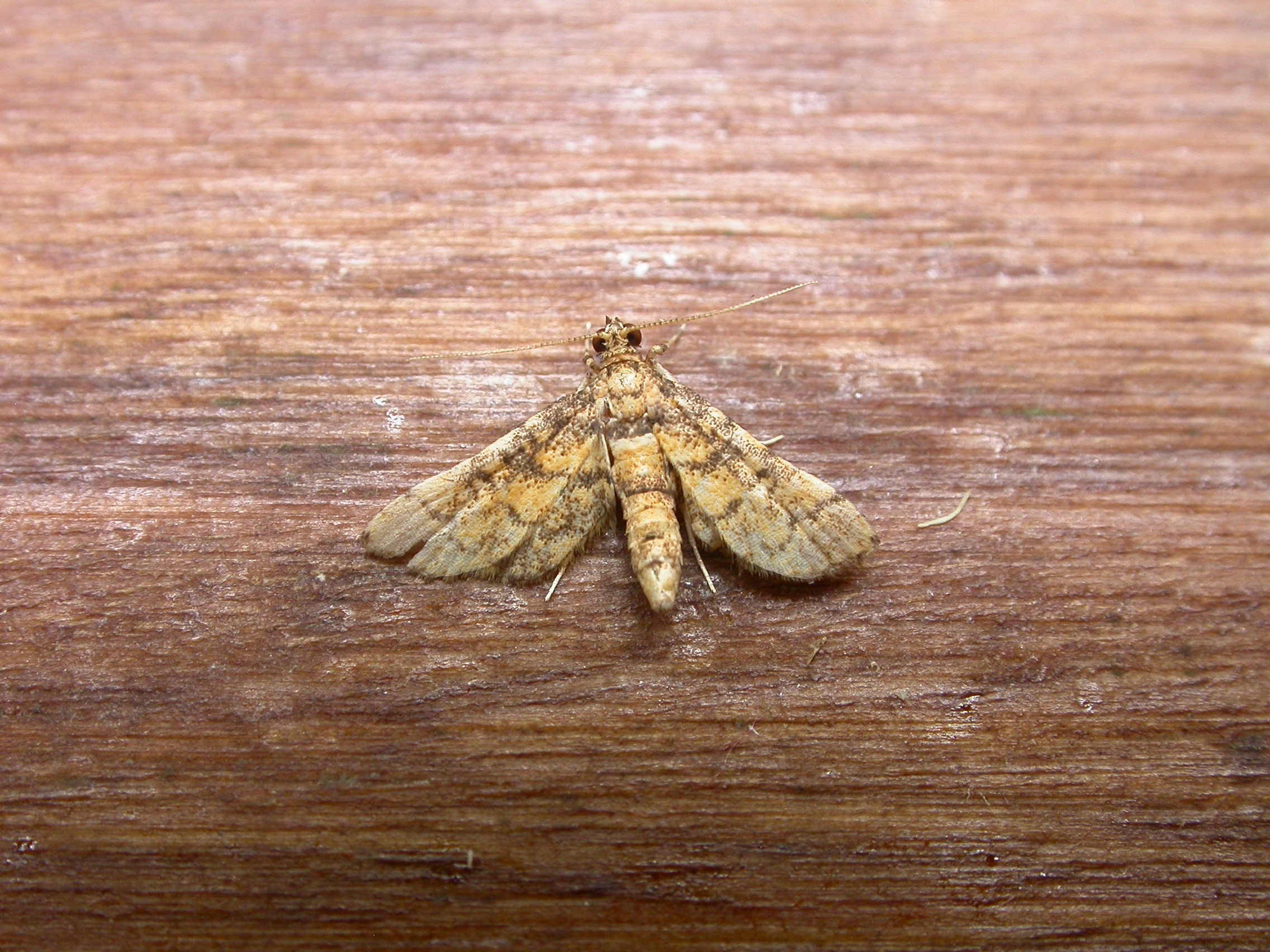

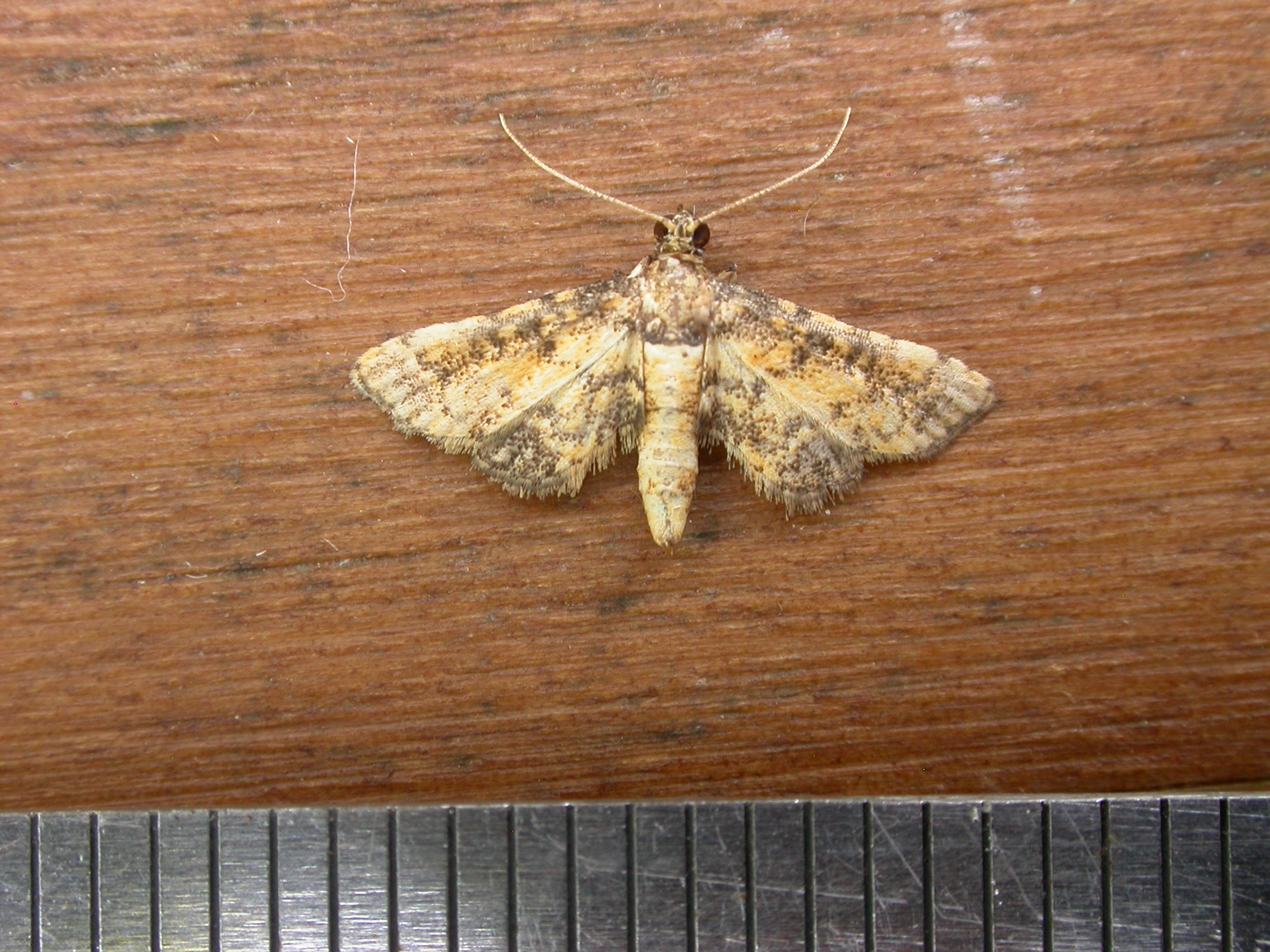
