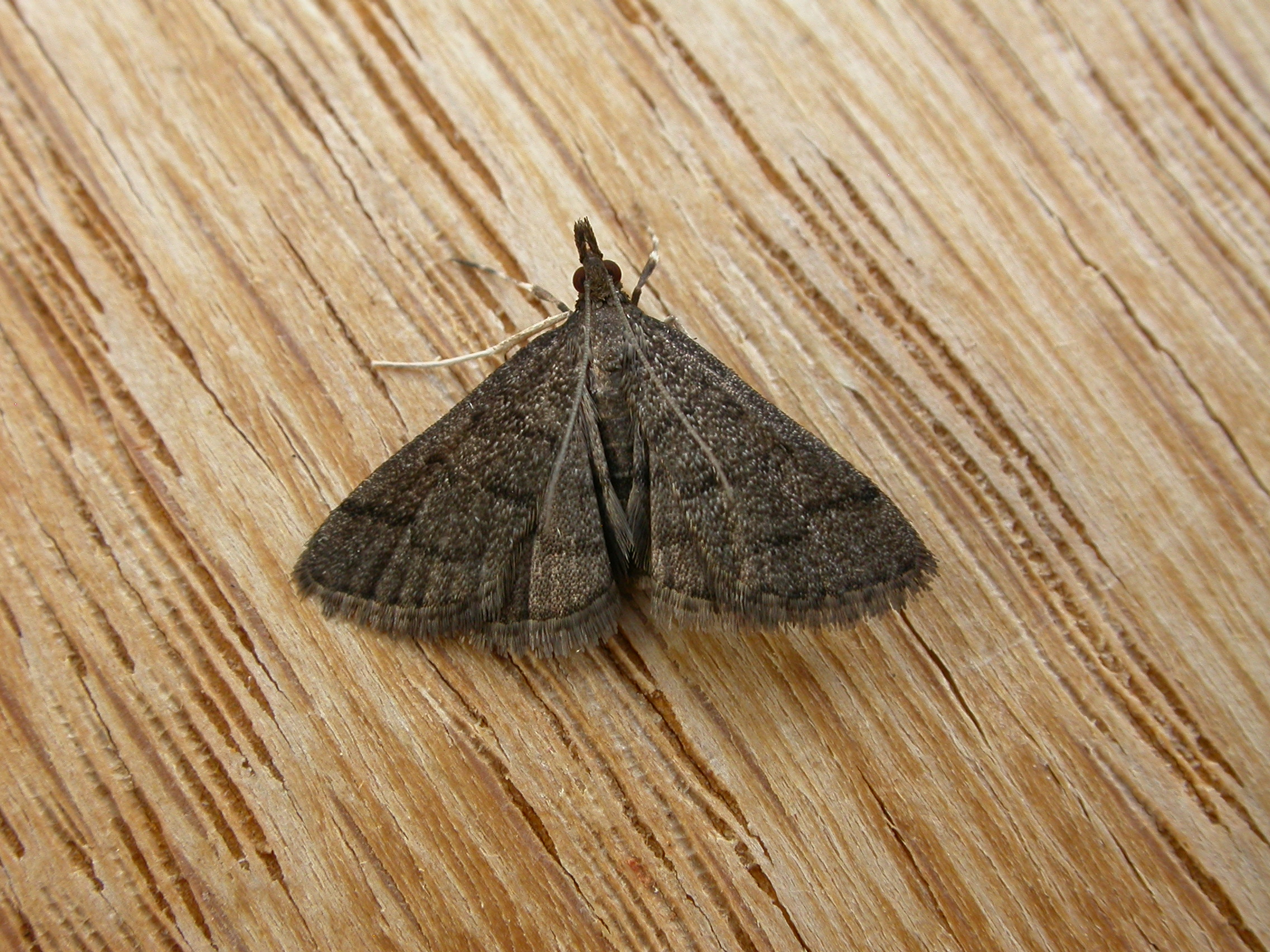

Scientific classification
- Kingdom: Animalia
- Phylum: Arthropoda
- Class: Insecta
- Order: Lepidoptera
- Family: Crambidae
- Subfamily: Spilomelinae
- Genus: Metasia
- Species: M. achroa

Binomial name
- Metasia achroa (Lower, 1903)

Synonyms
- Pionea achroa Lower, 1903

= Metasia achroa =

Species of moth

Metasia achroa is a species of moth of the family Crambidae described by Oswald Bertram Lower in 1903. It is known from Australia.
