= Metasia exculta =

Scientific classification
- Kingdom: Animalia
- Phylum: Arthropoda
- Class: Insecta
- Order: Lepidoptera
- Family: Crambidae
- Subfamily: Spilomelinae
- Genus: Metasia
- Species: M. exculta

Binomial name
- Metasia exculta Meyrick, 1934

Species of moth

Metasia exculta is a moth in the family Crambidae. It was described by Edward Meyrick in 1934. It is found in the Democratic Republic of the Congo, where it has been recorded from Katanga and Équateur.
