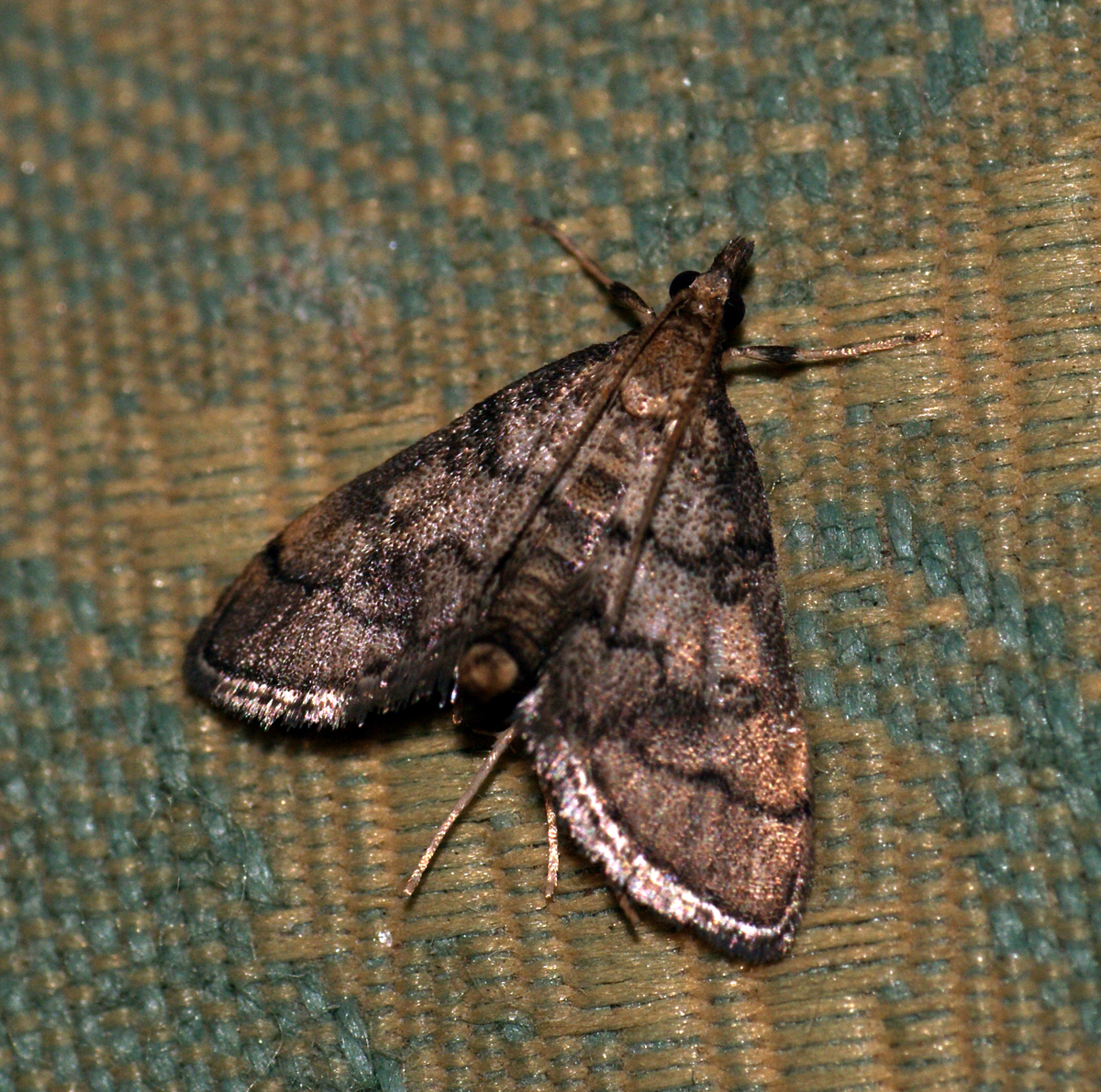

Scientific classification
- Domain: Eukaryota
- Kingdom: Animalia
- Phylum: Arthropoda
- Class: Insecta
- Order: Lepidoptera
- Family: Crambidae
- Subfamily: Spilomelinae
- Genus: Metasia
- Species: M. cuencalis

Binomial name
- Metasia cuencalis Ragonot, 1894

Synonyms
- Metasia cuencalis bourgognei P. Leraut, 2001; Metasia cuencalis goundafalis Zerny, 1935

= Metasia cuencalis =

Species of moth

Metasia cuencalis is a species of moth in the family Crambidae. It is found in France, Spain and Portugal, as well as in North Africa, including Morocco.

The wingspan is about 20 mm.

== Subspecies ==
These two subspecies belong to the species Metasia cuencalis:

- Metasia cuencalis bourgognei Leraut, 2001
- Metasia cuencalis cuencalis
