= Metasia profanalis =

Scientific classification
- Kingdom: Animalia
- Phylum: Arthropoda
- Class: Insecta
- Order: Lepidoptera
- Family: Crambidae
- Subfamily: Spilomelinae
- Genus: Metasia
- Species: M. profanalis

Binomial name
- Metasia profanalis (Walker, 1866)

Synonyms
- Botys profanalis Walker, 1866

Species of moth

Metasia profanalis is a moth in the family Crambidae. It was described by Francis Walker in 1866. It is found in the Democratic Republic of the Congo (Katanga), South Africa and Yemen.
