= Metasia delotypa =

Scientific classification
- Domain: Eukaryota
- Kingdom: Animalia
- Phylum: Arthropoda
- Class: Insecta
- Order: Lepidoptera
- Family: Crambidae
- Subfamily: Spilomelinae
- Genus: Metasia
- Species: M. delotypa

Binomial name
- Metasia delotypa (Turner, 1913): Criophthona delotypa Turner, 1913

Species of moth

Metasia delotypa is a moth in the family Crambidae. It was described by Turner in 1913. It is found in Australia, where it has been recorded from Queensland and New South Wales.

The wingspan is about 15 mm. The wings are lightly speckled grey-brown with dark zigzag lines.
