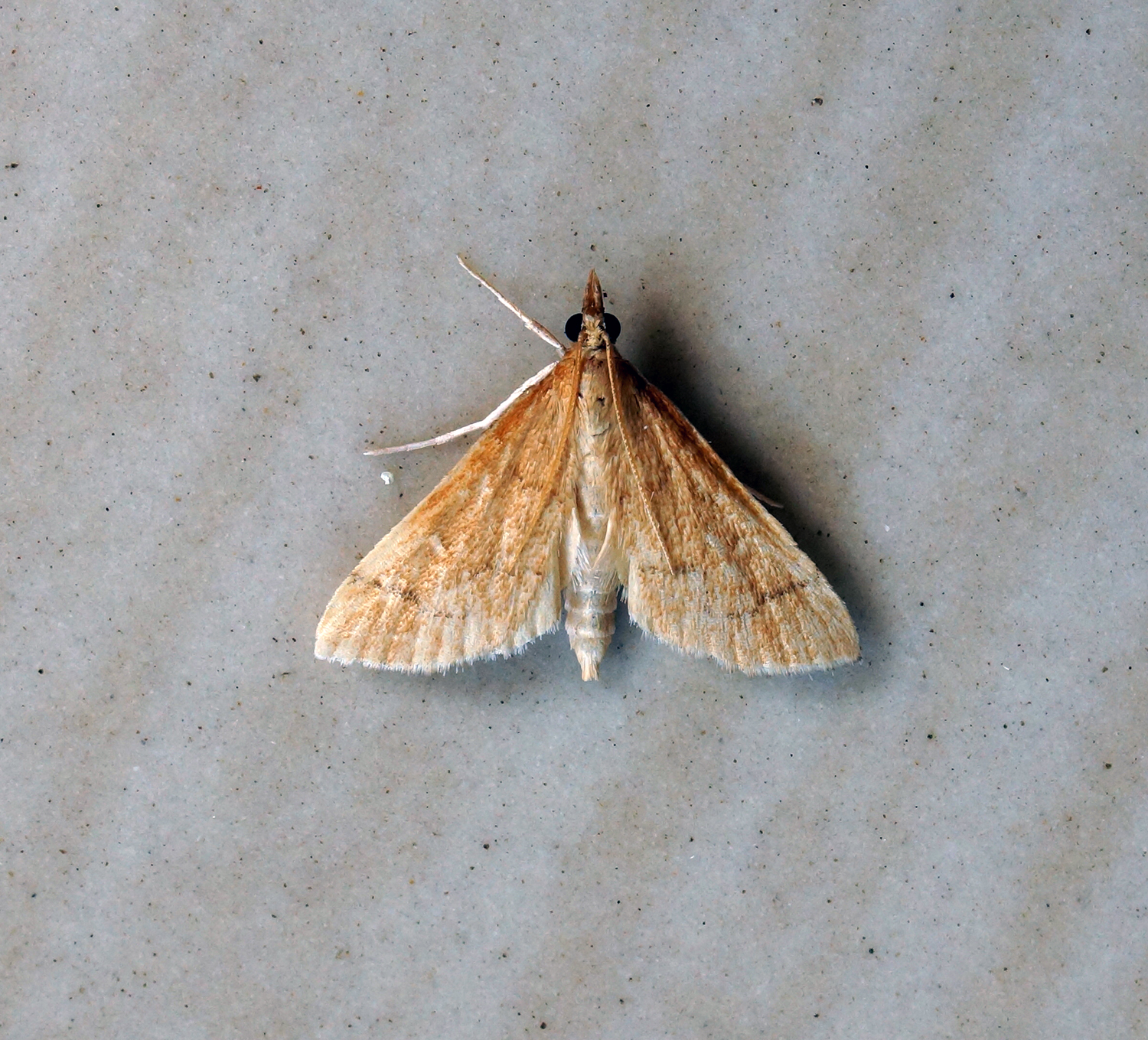
- Metasia rosealis

Scientific classification
- Domain: Eukaryota
- Kingdom: Animalia
- Phylum: Arthropoda
- Class: Insecta
- Order: Lepidoptera
- Family: Crambidae
- Subfamily: Spilomelinae
- Genus: Metasia
- Species: M. rosealis

Binomial name
- Metasia rosealis Ragonot, 1895

Synonyms
- Metasia cypriusalis Amsel, 1958; Metasia rubricalis Rebel, 1939; Pionea perfervidalis Hampson, 1900

= Metasia rosealis =

Species of moth

Metasia rosealis is a species of moth in the family Crambidae. It is found in Greece, on Cyprus, as well as in the Near East, including Turkey, Lebanon and Syria.
