= Metasia sabulosalis =

Scientific classification
- Domain: Eukaryota
- Kingdom: Animalia
- Phylum: Arthropoda
- Class: Insecta
- Order: Lepidoptera
- Family: Crambidae
- Subfamily: Spilomelinae
- Genus: Metasia
- Species: M. sabulosalis

Binomial name
- Metasia sabulosalis Warren, 1896

Species of moth

Metasia sabulosalis is a moth in the family Crambidae. It was described by Warren in 1896. It is found in India (Pune).
