= Metasia virginalis =

Scientific classification
- Domain: Eukaryota
- Kingdom: Animalia
- Phylum: Arthropoda
- Class: Insecta
- Order: Lepidoptera
- Family: Crambidae
- Subfamily: Spilomelinae
- Genus: Metasia
- Species: M. virginalis

Binomial name
- Metasia virginalis Ragonot, 1894

Synonyms
- Metasia virginialis Rebel, 1901

Species of moth

Metasia virginalis is a moth in the family Crambidae. It was described by Ragonot in 1894. It is found in Turkey.

The wingspan is about 17 mm.
