= Metasia aphrarcha =

Scientific classification
- Kingdom: Animalia
- Phylum: Arthropoda
- Class: Insecta
- Order: Lepidoptera
- Family: Crambidae
- Subfamily: Spilomelinae
- Genus: Metasia
- Species: M. aphrarcha

Binomial name
- Metasia aphrarcha (Meyrick, 1887)

Synonyms
- Eurycreon aphrarcha Meyrick, 1887

Species of moth

Metasia aphrarcha is a moth in the family Crambidae. It was described by Edward Meyrick in 1887. It is found in Australia, where it has been recorded from Western Australia.

The wingspan is 16–19 mm. The forewings are light fuscous, becoming darker towards the basal two-thirds of the costa. The lines are irregular, cloudy and blackish. The first runs from one-fourth of the costa to one-third of the inner margin, the second from three-fourths of the costa to beneath the discal spot and then bent to the inner margin at three-fifths, preceded and followed by a white irroration (sprinkles), especially towards the costa. There is an indistinct dark fuscous dot beneath the costa before the middle and a small subquadrate discal spot obscurely outlined with cloudy blackish beyond the middle. There is also a hind marginal row of cloudy blackish dots. The hindwings are pale greyish ochreous, irregularly irrorated with fuscous. There is an obscure fuscous discal dot.
