= Metasia criophora =

Scientific classification
- Kingdom: Animalia
- Phylum: Arthropoda
- Class: Insecta
- Order: Lepidoptera
- Family: Crambidae
- Subfamily: Spilomelinae
- Genus: Metasia
- Species: M. criophora

Binomial name
- Metasia criophora Hampson, 1899

Species of moth

Metasia criophora is a moth in the family Crambidae. It was described by George Hampson in 1899. It is found in Kenya.
