= Metasia albicostalis =

Scientific classification
- Kingdom: Animalia
- Phylum: Arthropoda
- Clade: Pancrustacea
- Class: Insecta
- Order: Lepidoptera
- Family: Crambidae
- Subfamily: Spilomelinae
- Genus: Metasia
- Species: M. albicostalis

Binomial name
- Metasia albicostalis Hampson, 1900

Synonyms
- Metasia berytalis Caradja, 1926

Species of moth

Metasia albicostalis is a species of moth in the family Crambidae. It is found on Cyprus and in Lebanon and Syria.

The wingspan is about 30 mm. The forewings are pale reddish brown. The forewings of the females are tinged with ferroginous red. The hindwings are white, the costal area tinged with brown. The hindwings of the female are yellowish-white.
