= Metasia xenogama =

Scientific classification
- Kingdom: Animalia
- Phylum: Arthropoda
- Class: Insecta
- Order: Lepidoptera
- Family: Crambidae
- Subfamily: Spilomelinae
- Genus: Metasia
- Species: M. xenogama

Binomial name
- Metasia xenogama (Meyrick, 1884)

Synonyms
- Eurycreon xenogama Meyrick, 1884

Species of moth

Metasia xenogama is a moth in the family Crambidae. It was described by Edward Meyrick in 1884. It is found in the Australian states of South Australia and Western Australia.
