= Metasia coniotalis =

Scientific classification
- Domain: Eukaryota
- Kingdom: Animalia
- Phylum: Arthropoda
- Class: Insecta
- Order: Lepidoptera
- Family: Crambidae
- Genus: Metasia
- Species: M. coniotalis

Binomial name
- Metasia coniotalis Hampson, 1903

Species of moth

Metasia coniotalis is a species of crambid moth. It is found in South and East Asia (India, Tibet, China, Japan).
