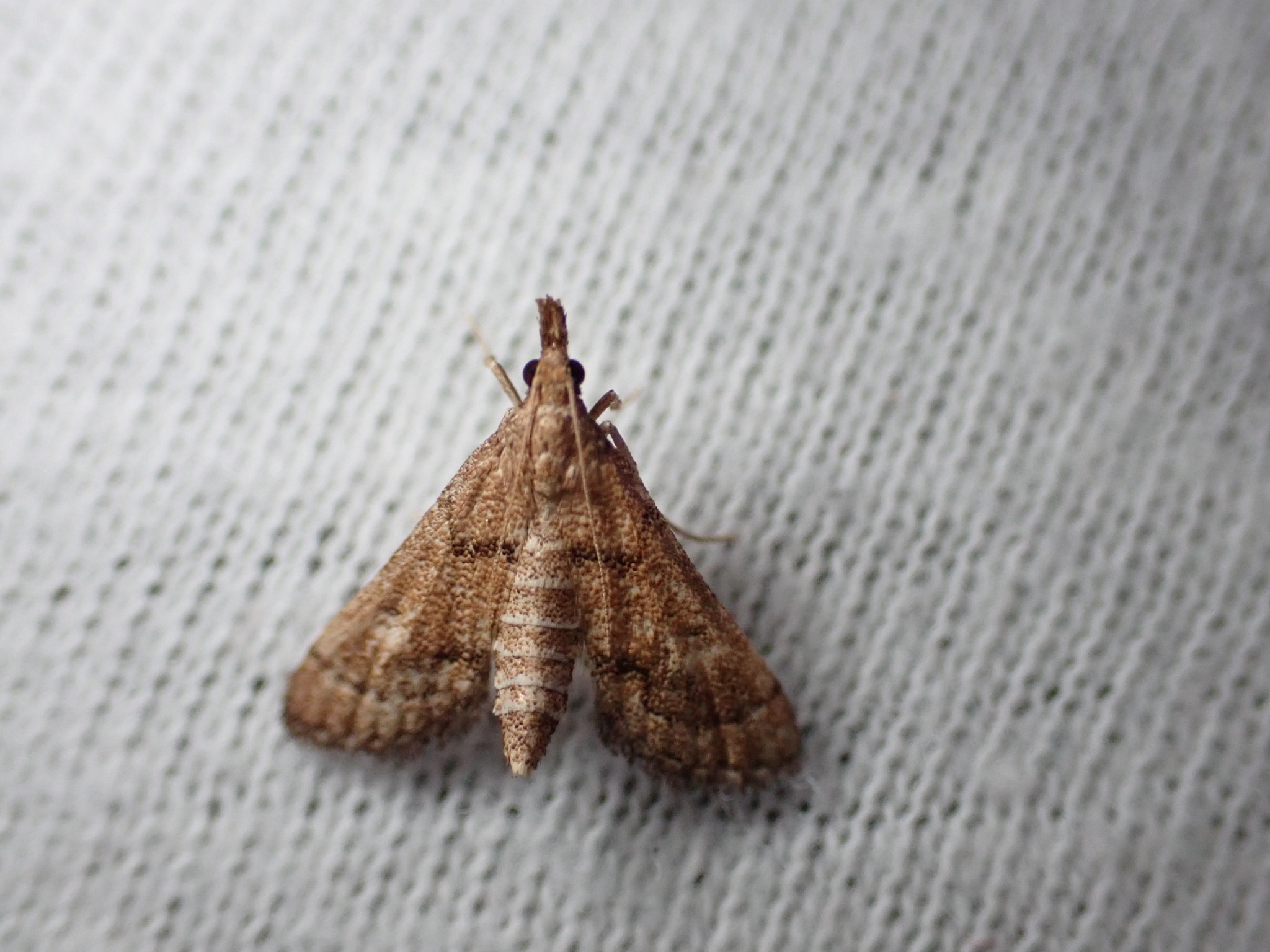
- Metasia corsicalis, France

Scientific classification
- Domain: Eukaryota
- Kingdom: Animalia
- Phylum: Arthropoda
- Class: Insecta
- Order: Lepidoptera
- Family: Crambidae
- Subfamily: Spilomelinae
- Genus: Metasia
- Species: M. corsicalis

Binomial name
- Metasia corsicalis (Duponchel, 1833)

Synonyms
- Cledeobia corsicalis Duponchel, 1833; Stenia infidalis Mann, 1855

= Metasia corsicalis =

Species of moth

Metasia corsicalis is a species of moth in the family Crambidae. It is found in France, Spain, Italy, Croatia and on Corsica, Sardinia, Sicily and Malta.
