= Metasia mzabi =

Scientific classification
- Domain: Eukaryota
- Kingdom: Animalia
- Phylum: Arthropoda
- Class: Insecta
- Order: Lepidoptera
- Family: Crambidae
- Subfamily: Spilomelinae
- Genus: Metasia
- Species: M. mzabi

Binomial name
- Metasia mzabi Rothschild, 1913

Species of moth

Metasia mzabi is a moth in the family Crambidae. It was described by Rothschild in 1913. It is found in Algeria.

The length of the forewings is about 11 mm. The forewings are white, although the basal fourth, costal area and outer fifth are sandy brownish orange. There is a large sandy yellow stigma, encircled with brown and a straight antemedial band, as well as a curved chocolate-brown transverse band. The terminal line is thin and brown. The hindwings are white with a sandy brownish orange stigma, postdiscal band and terminal band.
