= Metasia harmodia =

Scientific classification
- Kingdom: Animalia
- Phylum: Arthropoda
- Class: Insecta
- Order: Lepidoptera
- Family: Crambidae
- Subfamily: Spilomelinae
- Genus: Metasia
- Species: M. harmodia

Binomial name
- Metasia harmodia (Meyrick, 1887)

Synonyms
- Criophthona harmodia Meyrick, 1887

Species of moth

Metasia harmodia is a moth in the family Crambidae. It was described by Edward Meyrick in 1887. It is found in Australia, where it has been recorded from Western Australia.

The wingspan is 15–18 mm. The forewings are shining ochreous fuscous, the lines obscurely darker. The first from one-fourth of the costa to one-third of the inner margin, sometimes anteriorly whitish edged near the inner margin. The second runs from three-fourths of the costa to two-thirds of the inner margin, posteriorly partially finely edged with white, sometimes forming a spot on the costa. There is a roundish spot outlined with darker before the middle, and a subquadrate spot somewhat more distinctly outlined beyond the middle. The hindwings are fuscous grey, but darker towards apex.
