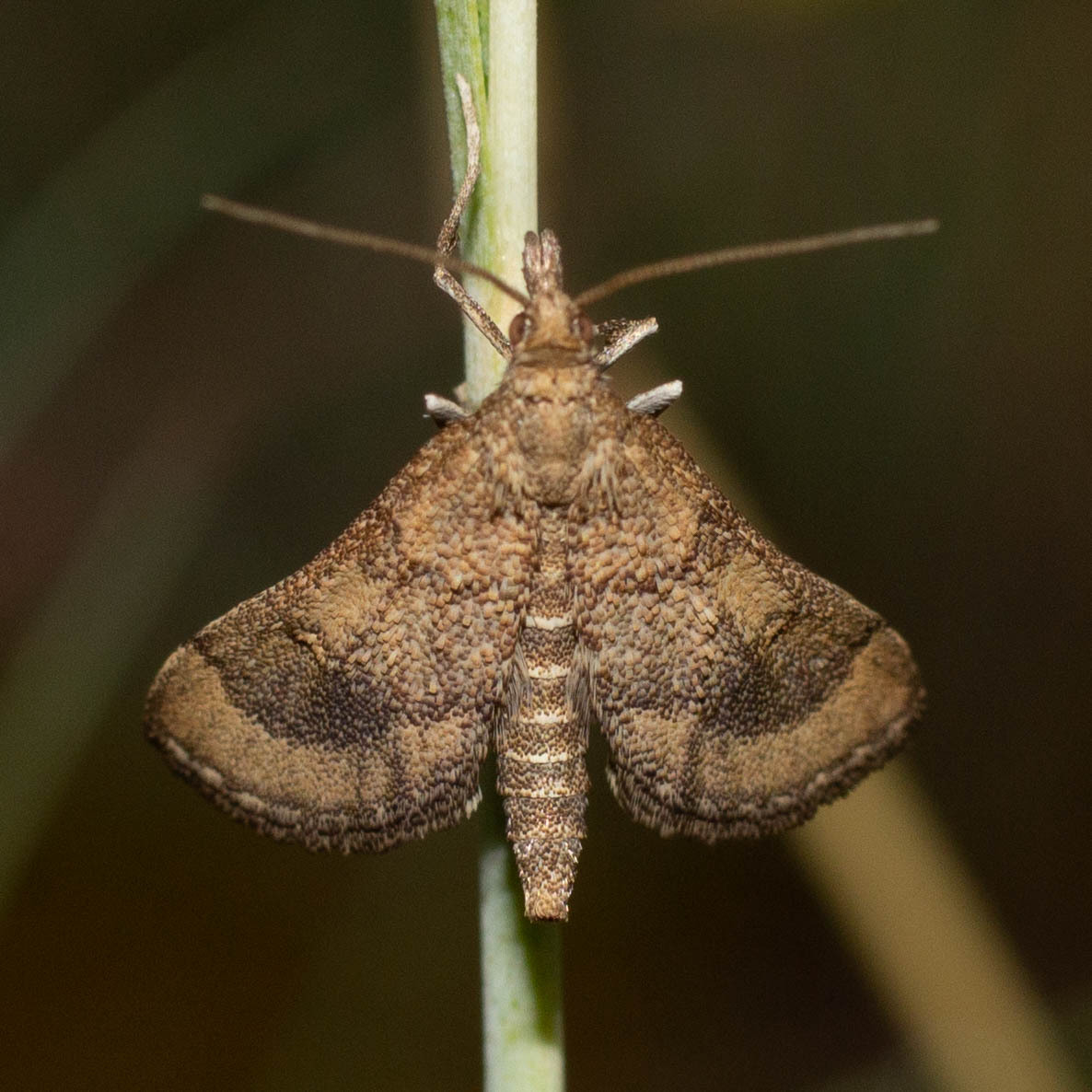
- Metasia ibericalis, Portugal

Scientific classification
- Domain: Eukaryota
- Kingdom: Animalia
- Phylum: Arthropoda
- Class: Insecta
- Order: Lepidoptera
- Family: Crambidae
- Subfamily: Spilomelinae
- Genus: Metasia
- Species: M. ibericalis

Binomial name
- Metasia ibericalis Ragonot, 1894

Synonyms
- Metasia oranalis Caradja, 1916; Metasia ibericalis rungsi P. Leraut, 2001

= Metasia ibericalis =

Species of moth

Metasia ibericalis is a species of moth in the family Crambidae. It is found in France, Spain and Portugal, as well as North Africa (including Morocco and Algeria).

The wingspan is about 19–22 mm.
