= Metasia strangalota =

Scientific classification
- Kingdom: Animalia
- Phylum: Arthropoda
- Class: Insecta
- Order: Lepidoptera
- Family: Crambidae
- Subfamily: Spilomelinae
- Genus: Metasia
- Species: M. strangalota

Binomial name
- Metasia strangalota (Meyrick, 1887)

Synonyms
- Eurycreon strangalota Meyrick, 1887

Species of moth

Metasia strangalota is a moth in the family Crambidae. It was described by Edward Meyrick in 1887. It is found in Australia, where it has been recorded from New South Wales.

The wingspan is about 19 mm. The forewings are pale whitish fuscous, coarsely irrorated (speckled) with dark fuscous. The first and second lines are strongly marked, irregular and blackish, the first running from one-fourth of the costa to one-third of the inner margin. The second runs from three-fourths of the costa to two-thirds of the inner margin. There is a small round pale spot strongly outlined with blackish beneath the costa beyond the first line, and a transverse-oblong pale discal spot strongly outlined with blackish beyond the middle. There is also a blackish dot on the costa above the discal spot and a cloudy irregular blackish hind-marginal line. The hindwings have a similar colour and markings as the forewings.
