= Triple X =

Triple X may refer to:

- Triple X syndrome, a chromosomal abnormality
- Triple X (professional wrestling), a former wrestling stable in Total Nonstop Action Wrestling
- Triple X ESPN Radio, a trio of sports radio stations in the Washington, D.C. area
- Triple X Records, an American record company
- WXXX, a radio station in Vermont known as "95 Triple X"
- Triple X, the code name of ghost prisoner Hiwa Abdul Rahman Rashul
- Triple X, the nickname of XXX Corps (Pakistan)
- XXXTentacion (1998–2018), American rapper sometimes referred to as "Triple X"
- Arms Corporation, a Japanese animation studio formerly known as Triple X

== See also ==
- XXX (disambiguation)
- Triplex (disambiguation)
