= Metasia ateloxantha =

Scientific classification
- Kingdom: Animalia
- Phylum: Arthropoda
- Class: Insecta
- Order: Lepidoptera
- Family: Crambidae
- Subfamily: Spilomelinae
- Genus: Metasia
- Species: M. ateloxantha

Binomial name
- Metasia ateloxantha (Meyrick, 1887)

Synonyms
- Eurycreon ateloxantha Meyrick, 1887

Species of moth

Metasia ateloxantha is a moth in the family Crambidae. It was described by Edward Meyrick in 1887. It is found in the Australian states of Queensland and New South Wales.

The wingspan is 10–11 mm. The forewings are whitish ochreous, suffusedly irrorated (sprinkled) with dark fuscous and with deep reddish-ochreous reflections. the lines are blackish fuscous. The hindwings are ochreous yellow, the base and centre of the disc irrorated with dark fuscous.
