= Triplex =

Triplex may refer to:

- Triplex (building), a dwelling composed of three units
- Triplex (espionage), code name of a British World War II espionage operation
- Triplex (film), a 1991 French film
- Triplex (genetics), triple-stranded DNA
- Triplex (juggling), a three-ball throw
- Triplex locomotive, a type of locomotive
- Triplex (typeface)
- Triplex Safety Glass, a brand of laminated glass
- D-type Triplex (New York City Subway car), a 3-section articulated New York City Subway Car
- White Triplex, a 1920s speed record car
- Triplex, a Concurrency (road), where one road bears three numbers
- Triplex (mathematics), a type of Hypercomplex number
- Triplex, a cinema multiplex with three screens
- Triplex (software), a visual editor for React (software) Three Fiber

== Species ==
- Triplex, a synonym of the sea snail genus Chicoreus
- Geastrum triplex, a fungus
- Givira triplex, a caterpillar and moth
- Metasia triplex, a caterpillar and moth
- Micrathetis triplex, a caterpillar and moth
- Mycobacterium triplex, a bacteria
- Phyllonorycter triplex, a caterpillar and moth
- Rinzia triplex, a shrub
- Terinebrica triplex, a caterpillar and moth

== See also ==
- Triple X (disambiguation)
- Triplex Cones, a group of volcanic cones in British Columbia, Canada
