= Metasia celaenophaes =

Scientific classification
- Domain: Eukaryota
- Kingdom: Animalia
- Phylum: Arthropoda
- Class: Insecta
- Order: Lepidoptera
- Family: Crambidae
- Subfamily: Spilomelinae
- Genus: Metasia
- Species: M. celaenophaes

Binomial name
- Metasia celaenophaes (Turner, 1913)

Synonyms
- Criophthona celaenophaes Turner, 1913

Species of moth

Metasia celaenophaes is a moth in the family Crambidae. It was described by Turner in 1913. It is found in Australia, where it has been recorded from Queensland.
