= Metasia octogenalis =

Scientific classification
- Kingdom: Animalia
- Phylum: Arthropoda
- Class: Insecta
- Order: Lepidoptera
- Family: Crambidae
- Subfamily: Spilomelinae
- Genus: Metasia
- Species: M. octogenalis

Binomial name
- Metasia octogenalis Lederer, 1863

Synonyms
- Epactoctena octogenalis

Species of moth

Metasia octogenalis is a species of moth in the family Crambidae. It is found in Syria, Iran and Turkey.
