= Metasia polytima =

Scientific classification
- Domain: Eukaryota
- Kingdom: Animalia
- Phylum: Arthropoda
- Class: Insecta
- Order: Lepidoptera
- Family: Crambidae
- Subfamily: Spilomelinae
- Genus: Metasia
- Species: M. polytima

Binomial name
- Metasia polytima Turner, 1908

Synonyms
- Metasia nyctichroa Turner, 1908

Species of moth

Metasia polytima is a moth in the family Crambidae. It was described by Turner in 1908. It is found in Australia, where it has been recorded from Queensland.

The wingspan 14–15 mm. The forewings are pale-reddish with a broad dark-fuscous costal streak, a fine fuscous transverse line and a pale discal spot outlined with fuscous and connected by a fine fuscous line with the dorsum beyond the middle. There is also a wavy dark-fuscous line from the costa to before the tornus and the disc is suffused with fuscous beyond this. The terminal line is dark-fuscous. The hindwings have the same colour, antemedian, postmedian and terminal lines as the forewings.
