= Metasia morbidalis =

Scientific classification
- Domain: Eukaryota
- Kingdom: Animalia
- Phylum: Arthropoda
- Class: Insecta
- Order: Lepidoptera
- Family: Crambidae
- Subfamily: Spilomelinae
- Genus: Metasia
- Species: M. morbidalis

Binomial name
- Metasia morbidalis Leech & South, 1901

Species of moth

Metasia morbidalis is a moth in the family Crambidae. It was described by John Henry Leech and Richard South in 1901. It is found in China.
