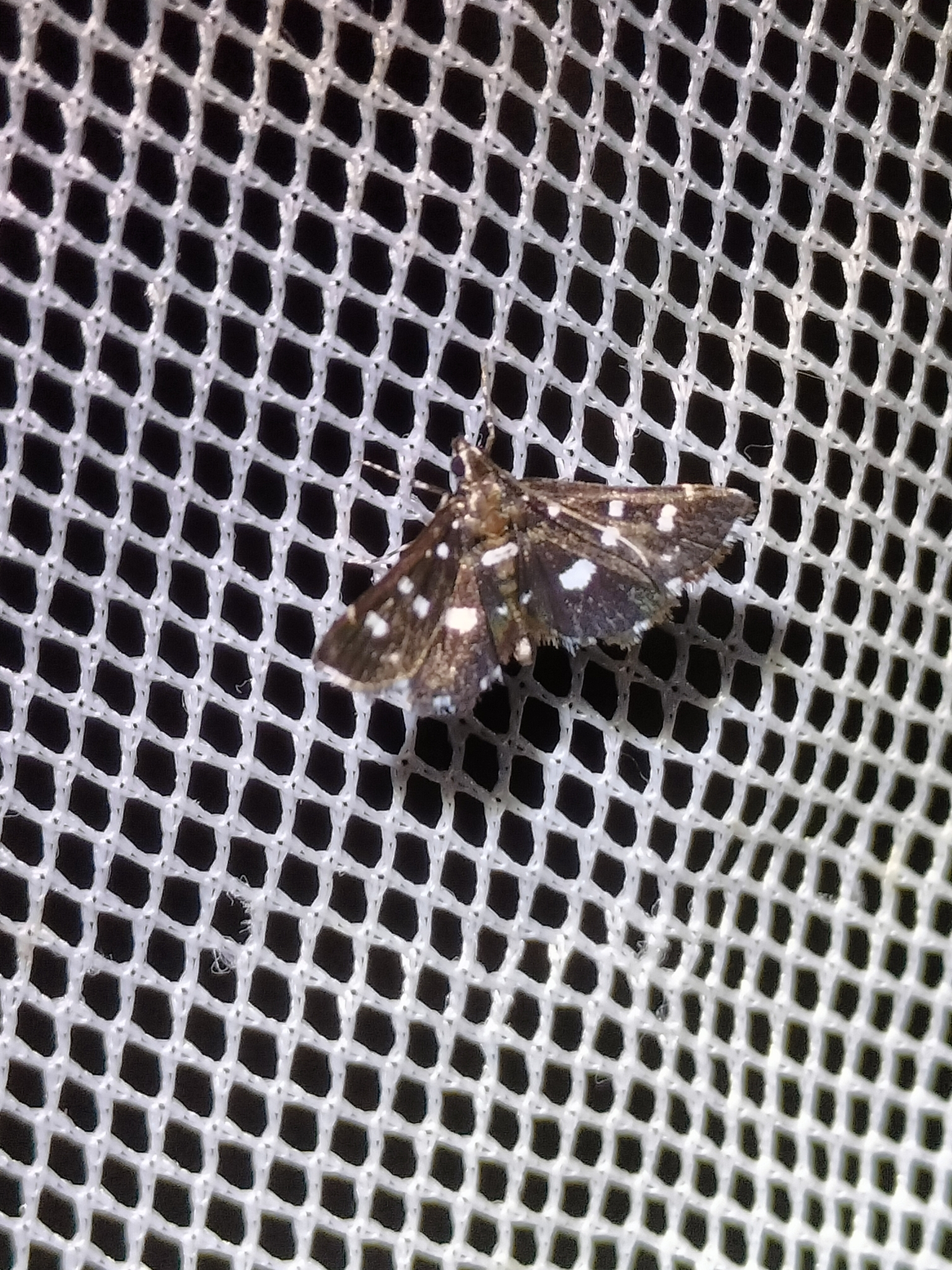
- Metasia zinckenialis, Queensland, Australia

Scientific classification
- Kingdom: Animalia
- Phylum: Arthropoda
- Class: Insecta
- Order: Lepidoptera
- Family: Crambidae
- Genus: Metasia
- Species: M. zinckenialis

Binomial name
- Metasia zinckenialis Hampson, 1899

= Metasia zinckenialis =

Species of moth

Metasia zinckenialis is a moth in the family Crambidae. It was described by George Hampson in 1899. It is found in Australia, where it has been recorded from Queensland.

The wingspan is about 15 mm. The wings are black with white spots.
