= Metasia homogama =

Scientific classification
- Kingdom: Animalia
- Phylum: Arthropoda
- Class: Insecta
- Order: Lepidoptera
- Family: Crambidae
- Subfamily: Spilomelinae
- Genus: Metasia
- Species: M. homogama

Binomial name
- Metasia homogama (Meyrick, 1887)

Synonyms
- Eurycreon homogama Meyrick, 1887

Species of moth

Metasia homogama is a moth in the family Crambidae. It was described by Edward Meyrick in 1887. It is found in Australia, where it has been recorded from Western Australia.

The wingspan is 16–20 mm. The forewings are whitish ochreous in males, tinged with brownish and with the costa obscurely suffused with pale brownish ochreous. In the female, the forewings are wholly pale brownish ochreous with cloudy, fuscous lines. The hindwings have a similar colour and markings as the forewings.
