= Metasia perfervidalis =

Scientific classification
- Kingdom: Animalia
- Phylum: Arthropoda
- Class: Insecta
- Order: Lepidoptera
- Family: Crambidae
- Subfamily: Spilomelinae
- Genus: Metasia
- Species: M. perfervidalis

Binomial name
- Metasia perfervidalis (Hampson, 1913)

Synonyms
- Pyrausta perfervidalis Hampson, 1913; Pyrausta prostygialis Hampson, 1913; Syngamia xanthofumosa Ghesquière, 1942

Species of moth

Metasia perfervidalis is a moth in the family Crambidae. It was described by George Hampson in 1913. It is found in the Democratic Republic of the Congo (Katanga), Kenya and South Africa.
