= Metasia phragmatias =

Scientific classification
- Domain: Eukaryota
- Kingdom: Animalia
- Phylum: Arthropoda
- Class: Insecta
- Order: Lepidoptera
- Family: Crambidae
- Subfamily: Spilomelinae
- Genus: Metasia
- Species: M. phragmatias

Binomial name
- Metasia phragmatias Lower, 1903

Synonyms
- Metasia diplophragma Turner, 1908

Species of moth

Metasia phragmatias is a moth in the family Crambidae. It was described by Oswald Bertram Lower in 1903. It is found in Australia, where it has been recorded from Queensland.

The wingspan is about 14 mm. The forewings are whitish ochreous with fuscous markings and some fuscous suffusion at the base. The hindwings have the same colour as the forewings.
