= Metasia hymenalis =

Scientific classification
- Kingdom: Animalia
- Phylum: Arthropoda
- Clade: Pancrustacea
- Class: Insecta
- Order: Lepidoptera
- Family: Crambidae
- Subfamily: Spilomelinae
- Genus: Metasia
- Species: M. hymenalis

Binomial name
- Metasia hymenalis Guenee, 1854

Species of moth

Metasia hymenalis is a species of moth in the family Crambidae. It is found in France and Spain, as well as North Africa (including Morocco) and Iran.

The wingspan is about 23 mm.
