= Metasia grootbergensis =

Scientific classification
- Kingdom: Animalia
- Phylum: Arthropoda
- Clade: Pancrustacea
- Class: Insecta
- Order: Lepidoptera
- Family: Crambidae
- Subfamily: Spilomelinae
- Genus: Metasia
- Species: M. grootbergensis

Binomial name
- Metasia grootbergensis Mey, 2011

Species of moth

Metasia grootbergensis is a moth in the family Crambidae. It was described by Wolfram Mey in 2011. It is found in Namibia.
