= Metasia perirrorata =

Scientific classification
- Kingdom: Animalia
- Phylum: Arthropoda
- Class: Insecta
- Order: Lepidoptera
- Family: Crambidae
- Subfamily: Spilomelinae
- Genus: Metasia
- Species: M. perirrorata

Binomial name
- Metasia perirrorata Hampson, 1913

Species of moth

Metasia perirrorata is a moth in the family Crambidae. It was described by George Hampson in 1913. It is found in the Democratic Republic of the Congo (Kasai-Occidental) and Nigeria.
