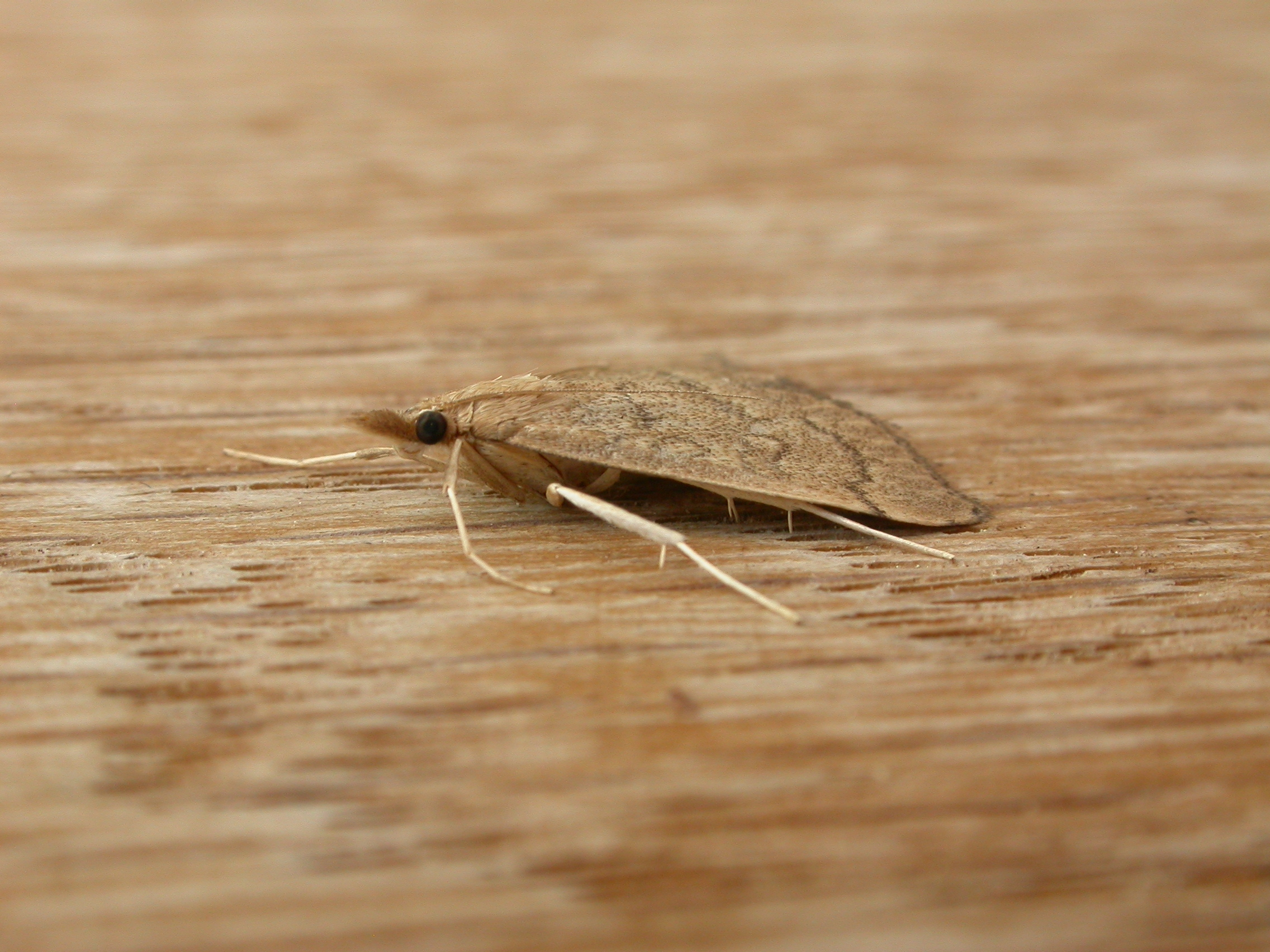

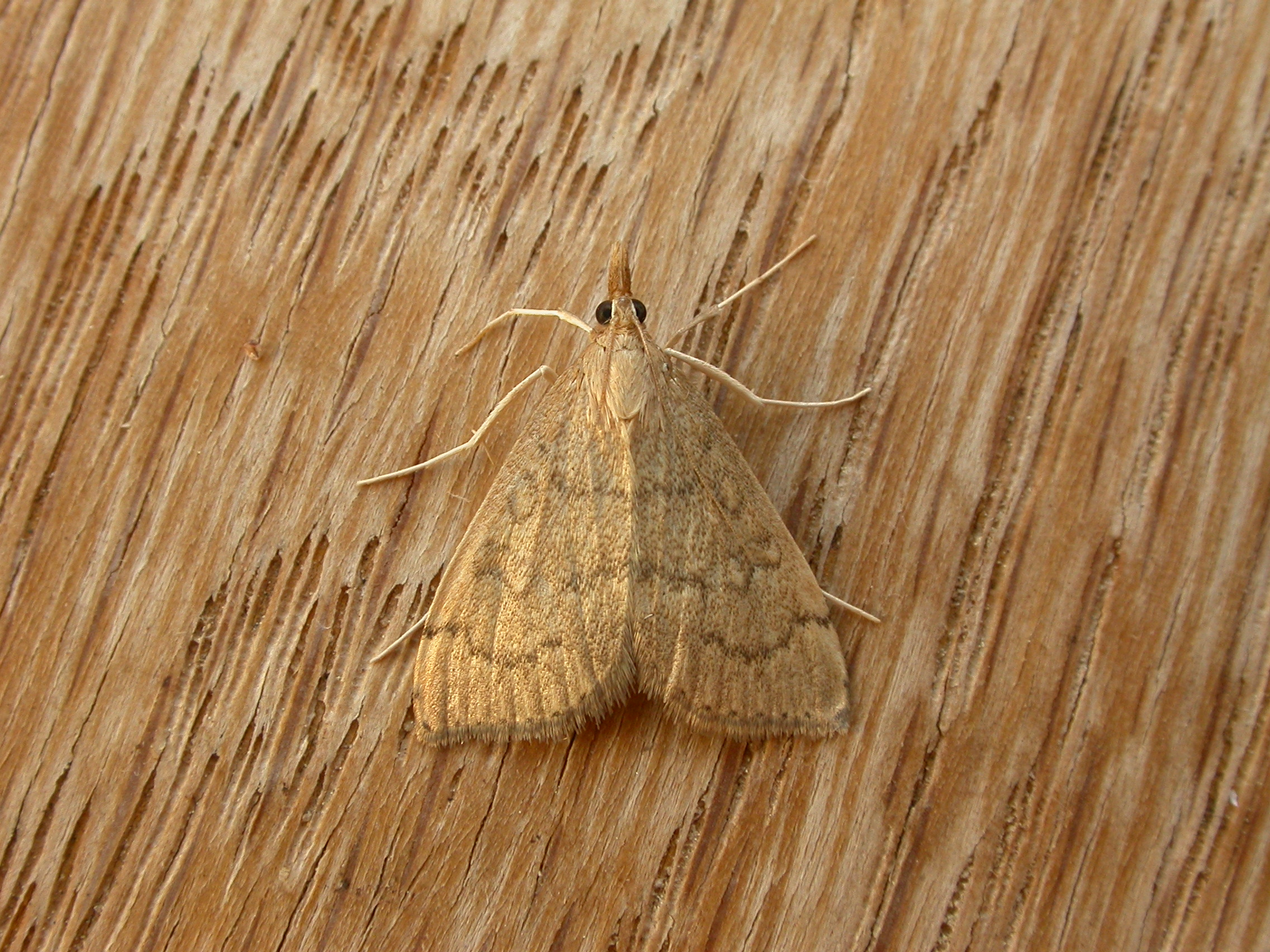

Scientific classification
- Kingdom: Animalia
- Phylum: Arthropoda
- Class: Insecta
- Order: Lepidoptera
- Family: Crambidae
- Subfamily: Spilomelinae
- Genus: Metasia
- Species: M. dicealis

Binomial name
- Metasia dicealis (Walker, 1859)

Synonyms
- Scopula dicealis Walker, 1859

= Metasia dicealis =

Species of moth

Metasia dicealis is a moth of the family Crambidae described by Francis Walker in 1859. It is known from Australia, where it has been recorded from New South Wales, the Australian Capital Territory and Victoria.

The wingspan is about 20 mm.
