= Metasia homophaea =

Scientific classification
- Kingdom: Animalia
- Phylum: Arthropoda
- Class: Insecta
- Order: Lepidoptera
- Family: Crambidae
- Subfamily: Spilomelinae
- Genus: Metasia
- Species: M. homophaea

Binomial name
- Metasia homophaea (Meyrick, 1885)

Synonyms
- Eurycreon homophaea Meyrick, 1885

Species of moth

Metasia homophaea is a moth in the family Crambidae. It was described by Edward Meyrick in 1885. It is found in Australia, where it has been recorded from New South Wales.
