= Metasia mimicralis =

Scientific classification
- Domain: Eukaryota
- Kingdom: Animalia
- Phylum: Arthropoda
- Class: Insecta
- Order: Lepidoptera
- Family: Crambidae
- Subfamily: Spilomelinae
- Genus: Metasia
- Species: M. mimicralis

Binomial name
- Metasia mimicralis Amsel, 1970

Species of moth

Metasia mimicralis is a moth in the family Crambidae. It was described by Hans Georg Amsel in 1970 and is found in Afghanistan.
