= 3X =

3X or 3-X may refer to:

== Computing ==
- Windows 3.x
- ArcView 3.x
- Windows NT 3.x
- IBM System/3X

== Music ==
- 3X Krazy, American hip-hop group
- Yeah 3x, single by Chris Brown
- Look 3X; see Look Look Look

== Transport ==
- 3X, IATA code for Japan Air Commuter
- Alberta Highway 3X; see List of Alberta provincial highways
- Saab 9-3X, a model of Saab 9-3
- SEV-3X, a model of Seversky SEV-3

== Other uses ==
- Three times or thrice
- 3X or XXX, a reference to the municipal flag of Amsterdam*
- HTV-3X, see DARPA Falcon Project

== See also ==
- X3 (disambiguation)
- XXX (disambiguation)
