= Metasia roseocilialis =

Scientific classification
- Kingdom: Animalia
- Phylum: Arthropoda
- Class: Insecta
- Order: Lepidoptera
- Family: Crambidae
- Subfamily: Spilomelinae
- Genus: Metasia
- Species: M. roseocilialis

Binomial name
- Metasia roseocilialis Hampson, 1918

Species of moth

Metasia roseocilialis is a moth in the family Crambidae. It was described by George Hampson in 1918. It is found in Malawi.
