= Metasia cyrnealis =

Scientific classification
- Kingdom: Animalia
- Phylum: Arthropoda
- Class: Insecta
- Order: Lepidoptera
- Family: Crambidae
- Subfamily: Spilomelinae
- Genus: Metasia
- Species: M. cyrnealis

Binomial name
- Metasia cyrnealis Schawerda, 1926

Synonyms
- Metasia cyrnealis sardinica Hartig, 1952

Species of moth

Metasia cyrnealis is a species of moth in the family Crambidae. It is known from Sardinia, Corsica, and Granada, southern Spain.
