= XXL =

XXL may refer to:

- XXL (club), in London, UK
- XXL (magazine), an American hip-hop magazine
- Penny Market XXL, a Romanian hypermarket chain
- XXL Sport & Villmark, a Norwegian sporting goods retailer

== Film and television ==
- XXL (film), a 1997 French comedy
- XXL (French TV channel), an adult TV station

== Music ==
- XXL (album), by Gordon Goodwin's Big Phat Band
- "XXL" (Keith Anderson song), 2005
- "XXL" (Mylène Farmer song), 1995
- "XXL" (Young Posse song), 2024
- XXL (Macedonian band), a girl group which took part in the Eurovision Song Contest 2000
- "XXL", a 2023 song by LANY from their album A Beautiful Blur
- Xiu Xiu Larsen, a combined project of the bands Xiu Xiu and Larsen

== See also ==
- Plus-size clothing
- XXX (disambiguation), the correct Roman numeral for 30
