= Metasia empelioptera =

Scientific classification
- Domain: Eukaryota
- Kingdom: Animalia
- Phylum: Arthropoda
- Class: Insecta
- Order: Lepidoptera
- Family: Crambidae
- Subfamily: Spilomelinae
- Genus: Metasia
- Species: M. empelioptera

Binomial name
- Metasia empelioptera J. F. G. Clarke, 1971

Species of moth

Metasia empelioptera is a moth in the family Crambidae. It was described by John Frederick Gates Clarke in 1971. It is found in French Polynesia, where it has been recorded from the island Rapa Iti.
