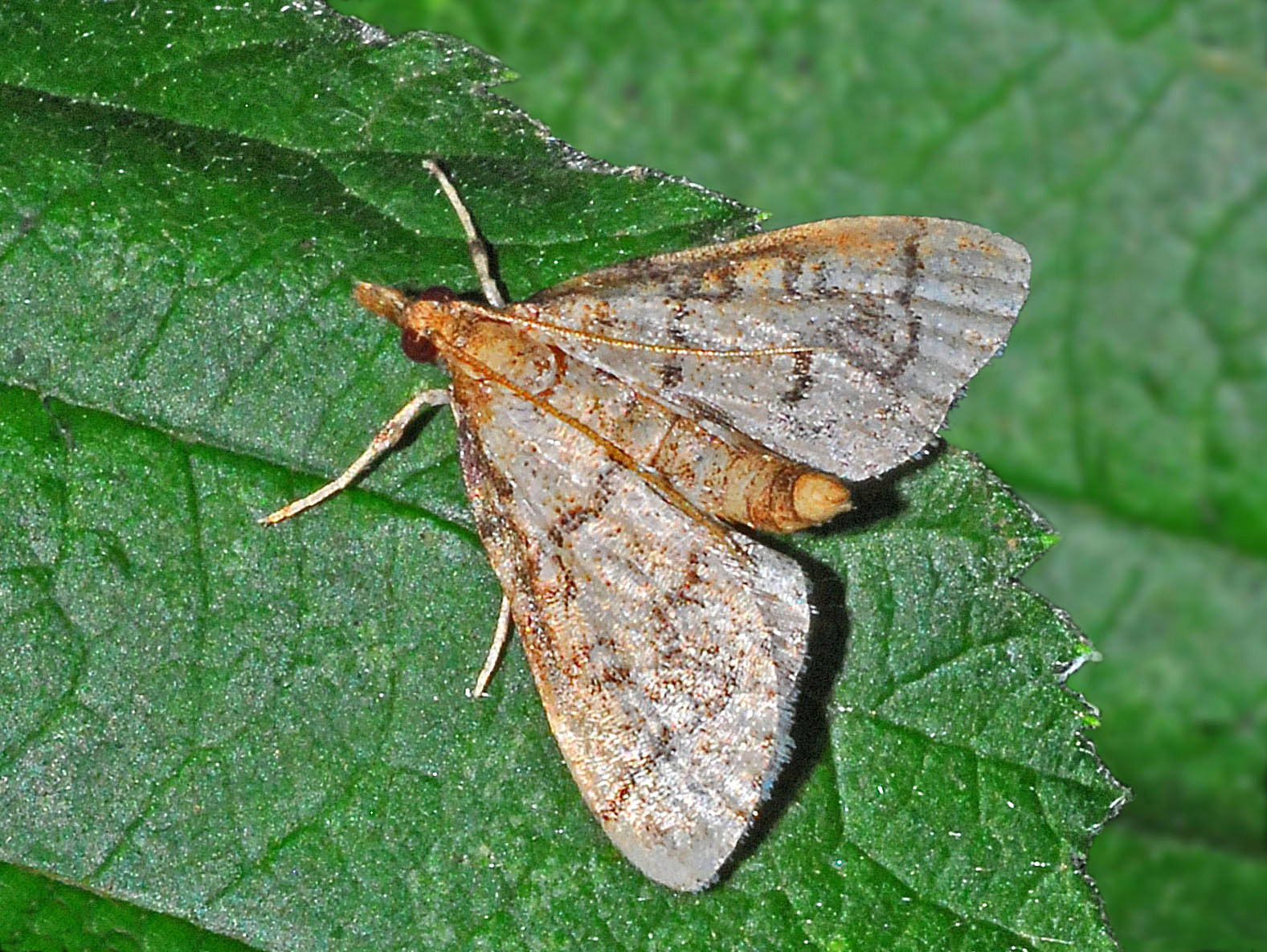
- Metasia ophialis

Scientific classification
- Kingdom: Animalia
- Phylum: Arthropoda
- Class: Insecta
- Order: Lepidoptera
- Superfamily: Pyraloidea
- Family: Crambidae
- Subfamily: Spilomelinae
- Genus: Metasia; Guenée, 1854

Synonyms
- Clasperia Hartig, 1952; Hystrixia Hartig, 1952; Epactoctena Meyrick, 1937; Aristidea Slamka, 2013; Metasis Inoue, 1996

= Metasia =

Genus of moths

Metasia is a genus of moths of the family Crambidae. They are found mainly in Europe and Australia, but also in Africa, Asia, North America, and Pacific islands.

== Species ==
The following species are members of the genus Metasia.

- Metasia acharis Meyrick, 1889
- Metasia achroa (Lower, 1903)
- Metasia albicostalis Hampson, 1900
- Metasia albula Hampson, 1899
- Metasia alvandalis Amsel, 1961
- Metasia angustipennis Rothschild, 1921
- Metasia annuliferalis Hampson, 1903
- Metasia aphrarcha (Meyrick, 1887)
- Metasia arenbergeri Slamka, 2013
- Metasia arida Hampson, 1913
- Metasia asymmetrica Amsel, 1970
- Metasia ateloxantha (Meyrick, 1887)
- Metasia baezi Falck, Karsholt & Slamka, 2022
- Metasia belutschistanalis Amsel, 1961
- Metasia bilineatella Inoue, 1996
- Metasia capnochroa (Meyrick, 1884)
- Metasia carnealis (Treitschke, 1829)
- Metasia celaenophaes (Turner, 1913)
- Metasia chionostigma Clarke, 1971
- Metasia comealis Amsel, 1961
- Metasia coniotalis Hampson, 1903
- Metasia corsicalis (Duponchel, 1833)
- Metasia criophora Hampson, 1899
- Metasia cuencalis Ragonot, 1894
- Metasia cyrnealis Schawerda, 1926
- Metasia delotypa (Turner, 1913)
- Metasia dicealis (Walker, 1859)
- Metasia dryocausta Meyrick, 1938
- Metasia ectodontalis Lower, 1903
- Metasia empelioptera Clarke, 1971
- Metasia eremialis Hampson, 1913
- Metasia exculta Meyrick, 1934
- Metasia familiaris (Meyrick, 1884)
- Metasia farsalis Amsel, 1961
- Metasia gigantalis (Staudinger, 1871)
- Metasia gnorisma Clarke, 1971
- Metasia grootbergensis Mey, 2011
- Metasia harmodia (Meyrick, 1887)
- Metasia hemicirca (Meyrick, 1887)
- Metasia hilarodes Meyrick, 1894
- Metasia hodiusalis (Walker, 1859)
- Metasia homogama (Meyrick, 1887)
- Metasia homophaea (Meyrick, 1885)
- Metasia hymenalis Guenée, 1854
- Metasia ibericalis Ragonot, 1894
- Metasia inustalis Ragonot, 1894
- Metasia kasyi Amsel, 1970
- Metasia kurdistanalis Amsel, 1961
- Metasia laristanalis Amsel, 1961
- Metasia liophaea (Meyrick, 1887)
- Metasia masculina (Strand, 1918)
- Metasia mimicralis Amsel, 1970
- Metasia minimalis Amsel, 1970
- Metasia morbidalis Leech & South, 1901
- Metasia mzabi Rothschild, 1913
- Metasia ochrochoa (Meyrick, 1887)
- Metasia octogenalis Lederer, 1863
- Metasia ophialis (Treitschke, 1829)
- Metasia orphnopis Turner, 1915
- Metasia ossealis Staudinger, 1879
- Metasia paganalis South, 1901
- Metasia pagmanalis Amsel, 1961
- Metasia parallelalis Rothschild, 1921
- Metasia parvalis Caradja, 1916
- Metasia perfervidalis (Hampson, 1913)
- Metasia perirrorata Hampson, 1913
- Metasia pharisalis (Walker, 1859)
- Metasia phragmatias Lower, 1903
- Metasia polytima Turner, 1908
- Metasia profanalis (Walker, 1866)
- Metasia punctimarginalis Hampson, 1913
- Metasia rebeli Slamka, 2013
- Metasia rosealis Ragonot, 1895
- Metasia roseocilialis Hampson, 1918
- Metasia sabulosalis Warren, 1896
- Metasia sefidalis Amsel, 1961
- Metasia sinuifera Hampson, 1913
- Metasia spilocrossa (Turner, 1913)
- Metasia straminealis Hampson, 1903
- Metasia strangalota (Meyrick, 1887)
- Metasia subtilialis Caradja, 1916
- Metasia suppandalis (Hübner, 1823)
- Metasia tiasalis (Walker, 1859)
- Metasia triplex (Turner, 1913)
- Metasia tumidalis Hampson, 1913
- Metasia typhodes Turner, 1908
- Metasia vicanalis South, 1901
- Metasia virginalis Ragonot, 1894
- Metasia xenogama (Meyrick, 1884)
- Metasia zinckenialis Hampson, 1899
- Metasia zophophanes (Turner, 1937)

== Former species ==
- Metasia continualis Amsel, 1961
- Metasia cypriusalis Amsel, 1958
- Metasia holoxanthia Hampson, 1899
- Metasia olbienalis Guenée, 1854
- Metasia oranalis Caradja, 1916
- Metasia prionogramma (Meyrick, 1886)
- Metasia pseudocontinualis Amsel, 1961
- Metasia rubricalis Rebel, 1939
- Metasia younesalis Chrétien, 1915
