= Metasia arenbergeri =

Scientific classification
- Domain: Eukaryota
- Kingdom: Animalia
- Phylum: Arthropoda
- Class: Insecta
- Order: Lepidoptera
- Family: Crambidae
- Subfamily: Spilomelinae
- Genus: Metasia
- Species: M. arenbergeri

Binomial name
- Metasia arenbergeri Slamka, 2013

Species of moth

Metasia arenbergeri is a moth in the family Crambidae. It was described by Slamka in 2013. It is found in Turkey.
