= Metasia typhodes =

Scientific classification
- Domain: Eukaryota
- Kingdom: Animalia
- Phylum: Arthropoda
- Class: Insecta
- Order: Lepidoptera
- Family: Crambidae
- Subfamily: Spilomelinae
- Genus: Metasia
- Species: M. typhodes

Binomial name
- Metasia typhodes Turner, 1908

Species of moth

Metasia typhodes is a moth in the family Crambidae. It was described by Turner in 1908. It is found in Australia, where it has been recorded from Queensland.

The wingspan is about 16 mm. The forewings are fuscous with darker lines. The hindwings are also fuscous, with a single transverse darker line from tornus to the costa.
