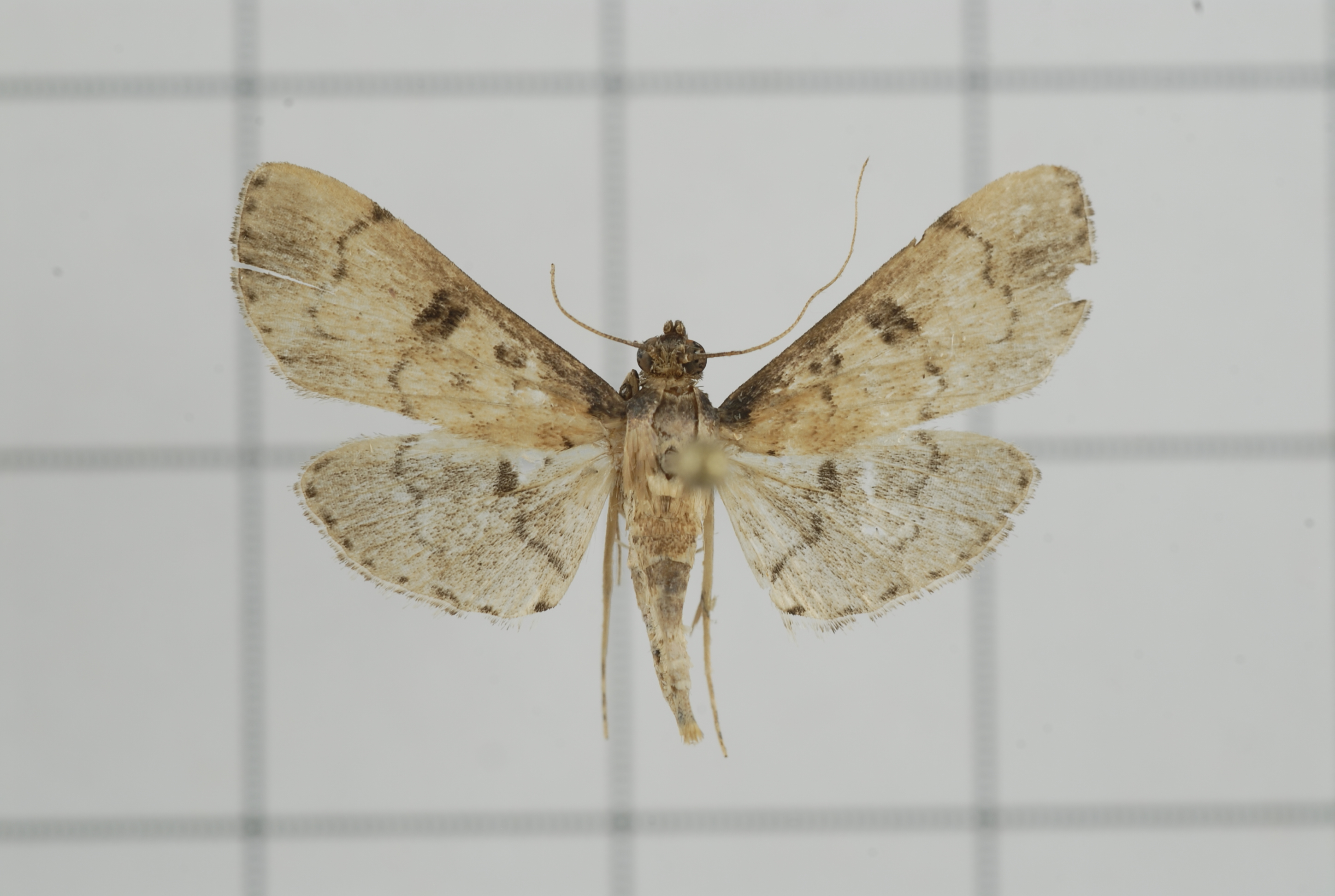

Scientific classification
- Domain: Eukaryota
- Kingdom: Animalia
- Phylum: Arthropoda
- Class: Insecta
- Order: Lepidoptera
- Family: Crambidae
- Subfamily: Spilomelinae
- Genus: Metasia
- Species: M. masculina

Binomial name
- Metasia masculina (Strand, 1918)

Synonyms
- Pyrausta masculina Strand, 1918

= Metasia masculina =

Species of moth

Metasia masculina is a moth in the family Crambidae. It was described by Strand in 1918. It is found in Taiwan.
