= Metasia hemicirca =

Scientific classification
- Kingdom: Animalia
- Phylum: Arthropoda
- Class: Insecta
- Order: Lepidoptera
- Family: Crambidae
- Subfamily: Spilomelinae
- Genus: Metasia
- Species: M. hemicirca

Binomial name
- Metasia hemicirca (Meyrick, 1887)

Synonyms
- Eurycreon hemicirca Meyrick, 1887

Species of moth

Metasia hemicirca is a moth in the family Crambidae. It was described by Edward Meyrick in 1887. It is found in Australia, where it has been recorded from Tasmania.

The wingspan is about 19 mm. The forewings are pale whitish fuscous, irregularly suffused with pale fuscous and irrorated (sprinkled) with dark fuscous. The lines are rather irregular, strong and dark fuscous. The hindwings are similar to the forewings in colour and markings, but there is a dark fuscous oblique transverse-linear discal spot before the middle.
