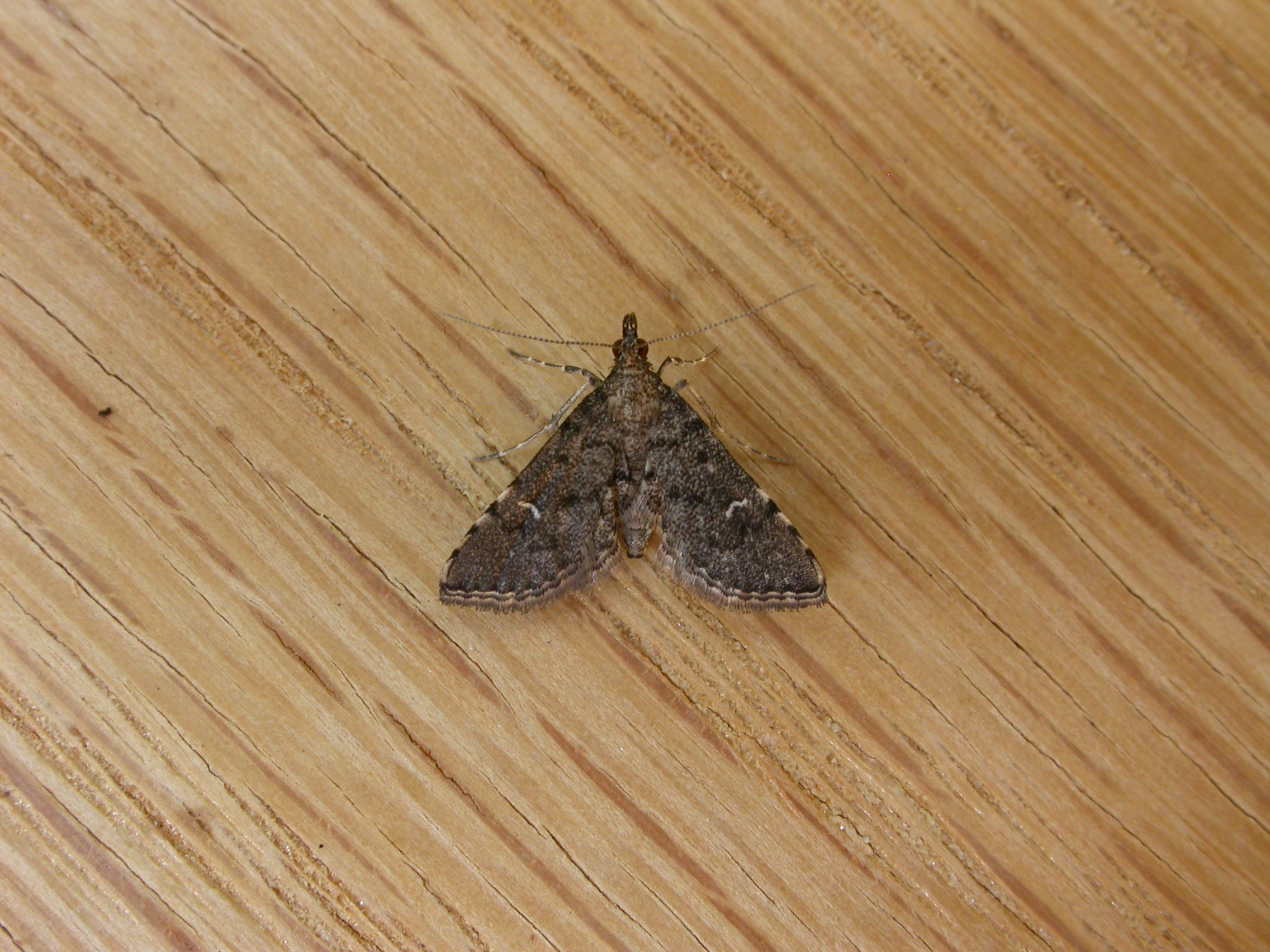

Scientific classification
- Kingdom: Animalia
- Phylum: Arthropoda
- Class: Insecta
- Order: Lepidoptera
- Family: Crambidae
- Subfamily: Spilomelinae
- Genus: Metasia
- Species: M. capnochroa

Binomial name
- Metasia capnochroa (Meyrick, 1884)

Synonyms
- Eurycreon capnochroa Meyrick, 1884

= Metasia capnochroa =

Species of moth

Metasia capnochroa is a species of moth of the family Crambidae described by Edward Meyrick in 1884. It is found in Australia, where it has been recorded from New South Wales, South Australia and Tasmania.
