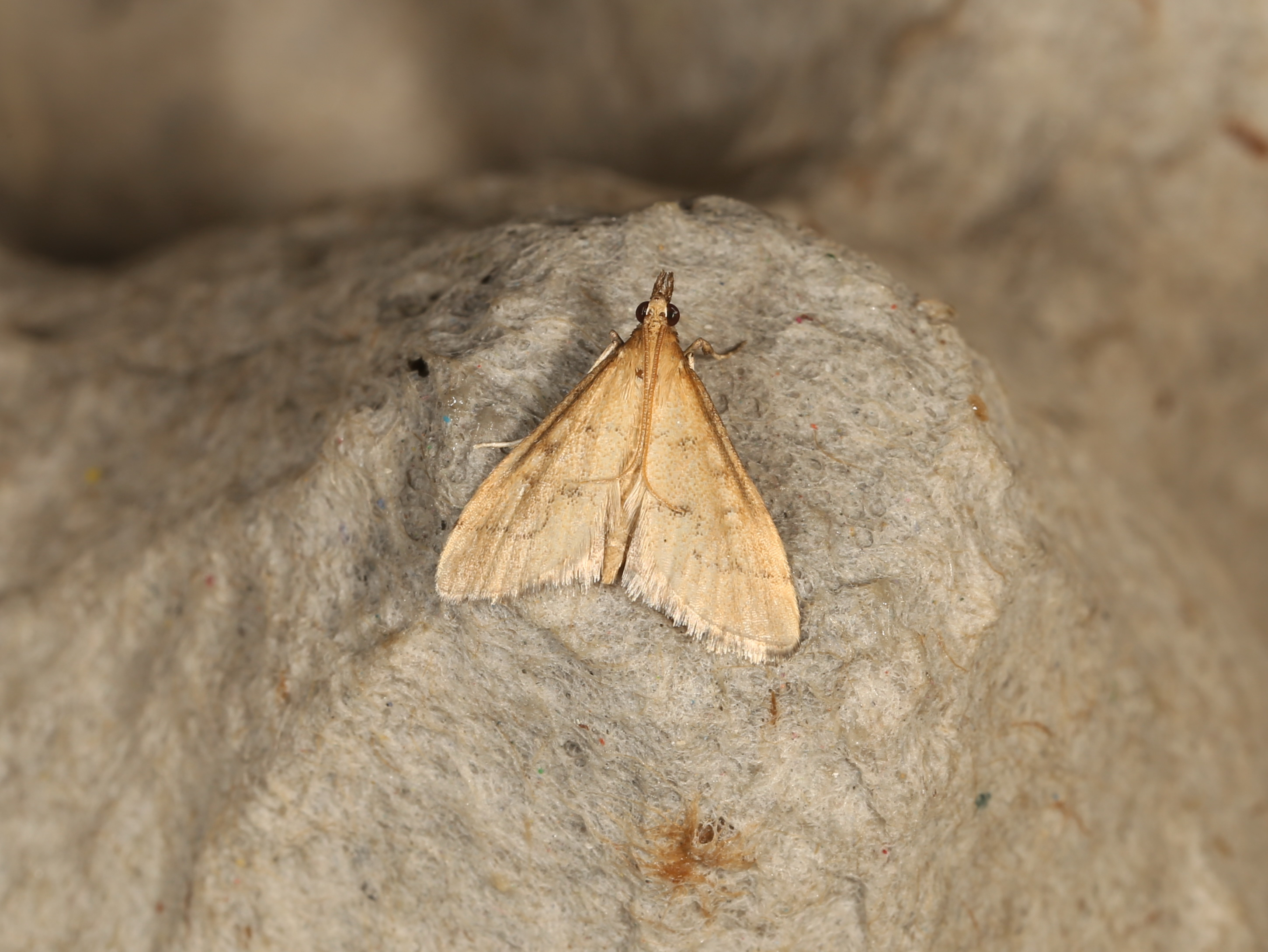

Scientific classification
- Kingdom: Animalia
- Phylum: Arthropoda
- Class: Insecta
- Order: Lepidoptera
- Family: Crambidae
- Subfamily: Spilomelinae
- Genus: Metasia
- Species: M. familiaris

Binomial name
- Metasia familiaris (Meyrick, 1884)

Synonyms
- Eurycreon familiaris Meyrick, 1884

= Metasia familiaris =

Species of moth

Metasia familiaris is a moth in the family Crambidae. It was described by Edward Meyrick in 1884. It is found in Australia, where it has been recorded from New South Wales and Tasmania.

== Description ==
The wingspan is 15–16 mm. The forewings are light ochreous brownish, the costa somewhat darker. There is a very small blackish spot on the costa at four-fifths and sometimes some scattered dark fuscous scales forming an ill-defined line from this to two-thirds of the inner margin. There are also some obscure dark fuscous hindmarginal dots. The hindwings are light ochreous, irregularly suffused with grey and with a faint darker line as in the forewings. The hind marginal dots are as in the forewings.
