= Metasia triplex =

Scientific classification
- Kingdom: Animalia
- Phylum: Arthropoda
- Clade: Pancrustacea
- Class: Insecta
- Order: Lepidoptera
- Family: Crambidae
- Subfamily: Spilomelinae
- Genus: Metasia
- Species: M. triplex

Binomial name
- Metasia triplex (Turner, 1913)

Synonyms
- Conoprora triplex Turner, 1913

Species of moth

Metasia triplex is a moth in the family Crambidae. It was described by Turner in 1913. It is found in Australia, where it has been recorded from Queensland.

The wingspan is about 14 mm. The forewings have three oblique fuscous lines, as well as an indistinct interrupted terminal line. The hindwings are whitish.
