= Dichomeris albula =

Scientific classification
- Kingdom: Animalia
- Phylum: Arthropoda
- Class: Insecta
- Order: Lepidoptera
- Family: Gelechiidae
- Genus: Dichomeris
- Species: D. albula

Binomial name
- Dichomeris albula Park & Hodges, 1995

Species of moth

Dichomeris albula is a moth of the family Gelechiidae. It was described by Kyu-Tek Park and Ronald W. Hodges in 1995. It is indigenous to Taiwan.

The length of the forewings is 7–7.5 mm.
