= Agrisius albula =

Scientific classification
- Domain: Eukaryota
- Kingdom: Animalia
- Phylum: Arthropoda
- Class: Insecta
- Order: Lepidoptera
- Superfamily: Noctuoidea
- Family: Erebidae
- Subfamily: Arctiinae
- Genus: Agrisius
- Species: A. albula

Binomial name
- Agrisius albula Orhant, 1997

Species of moth

Agrisius albula is a moth of the subfamily Arctiinae. It is found in Myanmar.
