= Triple Cross =

Triple Cross or triple cross may refer to:

- Papal cross, also called a triple cross
- The three-barred Russian Orthodox cross
- The three-barred Maronite cross
- Triple Cross (1966 film), a British film directed by Terence Young
- Triple Cross (1991 film), an Indonesian film starring Cynthia Rothrock
- The Triple Cross, a 1992 Japanese film directed by Kinji Fukasaku
- Triple cross hybrid, in biology via crossbreeding

== See also ==
- XXX (disambiguation)
- Double cross (disambiguation)
- "Treble Cross", the 21st episode of the British Supermarionation television series Captain Scarlet and the Mysterons
