= X3 (group) =

Australian group

- Origin: Sydney, New South Wales, Australia
- Genre: R&B
- Years active: 2000–2001
- Label: Columbia
- Past members: Brianna Nicholls, Fiona Henson, Anna Le

X3 were a short-lived Australian group, consisting of Brianna Nicholls, Fiona Henson and Anna Le.

The debut single "A Girl Like Me" was written by T-Boz from TLC. The song was released in May 2001 and peaked at number 28 on the ARIA Charts.

A studio album was recorded, titled Wanted and was scheduled for release in September 2001, but was not released.

== Discography ==
=== Singles ===
List of singles, with selected chart positions
Title	Year	Chart positions
Title	Year	AUS
"Girl Like Me"	2001	28
"Upside Down"	2001	77
