= Phaeopate =

Scientific classification
- Kingdom: Animalia
- Phylum: Arthropoda
- Class: Insecta
- Order: Coleoptera
- Suborder: Polyphaga
- Infraorder: Cucujiformia
- Family: Cerambycidae
- Genus: Phaeopate
- Species: P. albula

Binomial name
- Phaeopate albula Pascoe, 1865

Genus of beetles

Phaeopate albula is a species of beetle in the family Cerambycidae, and the only species in the genus Phaeopate. It was described by Pascoe in 1865.
