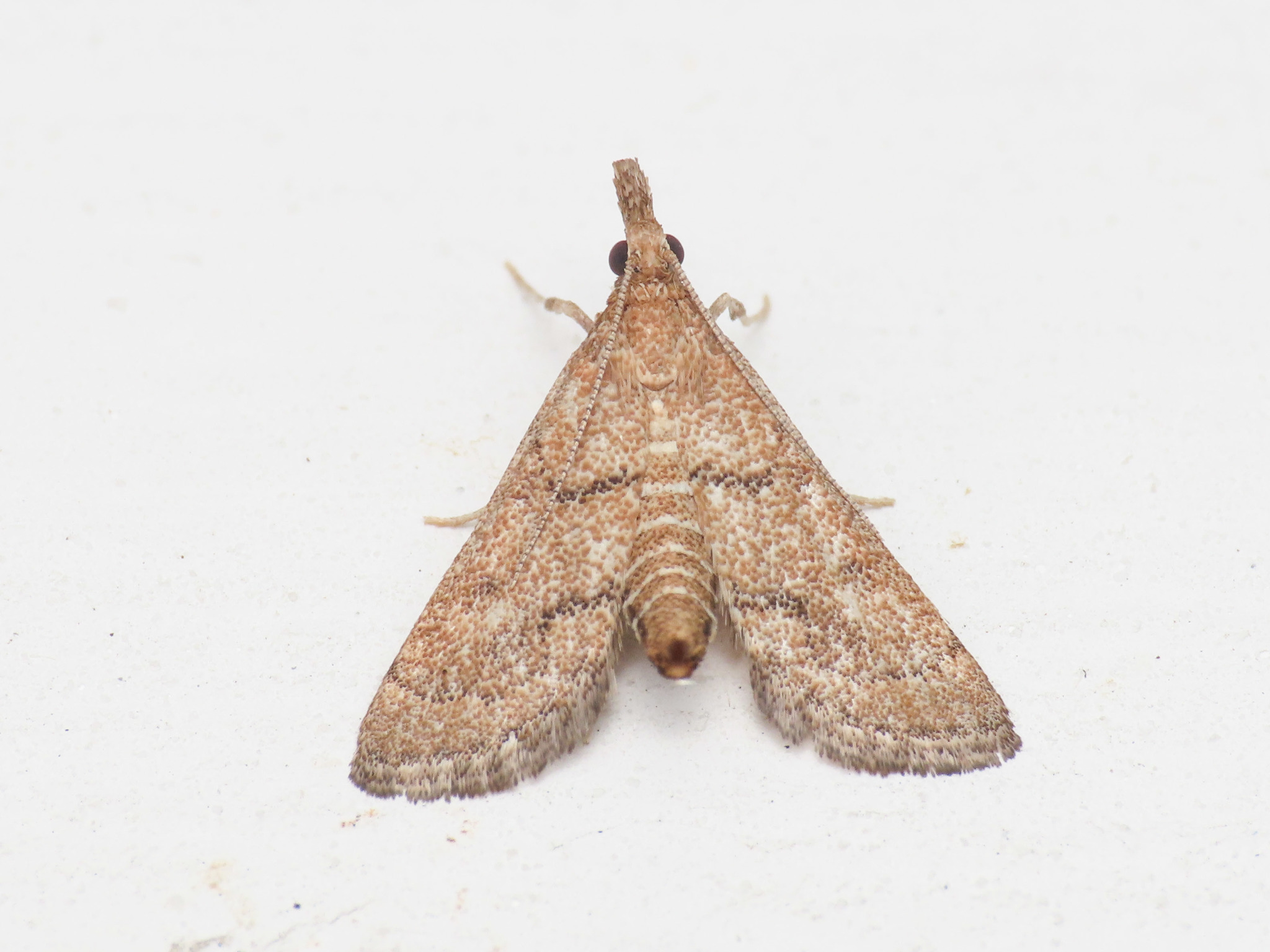
- Metasia carnealis, Italy

Scientific classification
- Domain: Eukaryota
- Kingdom: Animalia
- Phylum: Arthropoda
- Class: Insecta
- Order: Lepidoptera
- Family: Crambidae
- Subfamily: Spilomelinae
- Genus: Metasia
- Species: M. carnealis

Binomial name
- Metasia carnealis (Treitschke, 1829)

Synonyms
- Botys carnealis Treitschke, 1829; Metasia olbienalis Guenée, 1854; Metasia olbienalis var. aegitnalis Millière, 1886; Metasia olbienalis ab. aegitnalis

= Metasia carnealis =

Species of moth

Metasia carnealis is a species of moth in the family Crambidae. It is found in France, Spain, Italy, Austria, Croatia, Bosnia and Herzegovina, Romania, Bulgaria, the Republic of North Macedonia, Albania, Greece and on Sardinia and Sicily, as well as in Turkey.

The wingspan is about 17-18 mm.
