= McKenzie Creek =

McKenzie Creek may refer to:

- McKenzie Creek (Black River), a stream in Missouri
- McKenzie Creek (Osage River), a stream in Missouri
- McKenzie Creek (Lake Erie), a watershed administered by the Long Point Region Conservation Authority, that drains into Lake Erie
- McKenzie Creek (River des Peres), a tributary to River des Peres near Shrewsbury, MO
