= Greasy Creek =

Greasy Creek may refer to:

- Greasy Creek, Kentucky, an unincorporated community in Pike County
- Greasy Creek (Kentucky), a stream in Leslie County, in whose drainage area is the John Shell Cabin
- Greasy Creek (Big Sugar Creek tributary), a stream in Missouri
- Greasy Creek (Castor River tributary), a stream in Missouri
- Greasy Creek (McKenzie Creek tributary), a stream in Missouri
- Greasy Creek (Niangua River tributary), a stream in Missouri
- Greasy Creek (Saline River tributary), a stream in Missouri
