= Grease =

Grease may refer to:

== Common uses ==
- Grease (lubricant), a type of industrial lubricant
- Grease, any petroleum or fat (including cooking fat) that is a soft solid at room temperature
  - Brown grease, waste vegetable oil, animal fat, grease, etc. that is recovered from a grease trap
  - Yellow grease, in rendering, used frying oils, or lower-quality grades of tallow
- Hydrogenated vegetable oil, used as a replacement for lard and other rendered animal fats
- Vegetable shortening, used as a replacement for lard and other rendered animal fats

=== Slang ===
- Grease, a euphemism meaning to bribe, as in "to grease someone's palm"
- Grease, a slang term for killing, as in "The mob has been known to grease anyone who gets in its way"
- Pomade, a hair styling wax

== Arts, entertainment, and media ==
=== Theater ===
- Grease (musical), a 1971 stage musical

=== Films ===
- Grease (film), 1978 film made from the musical, starring John Travolta and Olivia Newton-John
- Grease 2, the 1982 film sequel, starring Maxwell Caulfield and Michelle Pfeiffer

=== Music ===
- "Grease" (song), the title song of the 1978 film
- "Grease" song, a song from the 1971 stage musical
- Grease: The Original Soundtrack from the Motion Picture, the soundtrack album to the 1978 film
- Grease: The New Broadway Cast Recording (2007 album), the new Broadway cast recording of the musical featuring Max Crumm and Laura Osnes

=== Television ===
==== Series ====
- Grease: Live, an American 2016 live TV musical that combines aspects of the 1971 stage musical and 1978 film
- Grease: You're the One that I Want!, an American 2007 reality TV show casting the lead roles in revivals of the musical
- Grease Is the Word, a British 2007 reality TV show casting the lead roles in revivals of the musical

==== Episodes ====
- "Grease", Extreme Ghostbusters episode 14 (1997)
- "Grease", The Keith & Paddy Picture Show season 2, episode 1 (2018)

=== Other uses in arts, entertainment, and media ===
- Grease (franchise), the films and TV productions based on the 1971 musical
- Grease (video game), a video game based on the 1978 film

== Biology and healthcare ==
- Grease, or Mud fever, a disease-causing irritation and dermatitis in the lower limbs of horses, most commonly in the pastern and heel area
- Grease moth (Aglossa cuprina), a fat-feeding moth

== Computing ==
- Grease (networking), or GREASE, a protocol ossification prevention method

== See also ==
- Greaser (disambiguation)
- Greasy (disambiguation)
- Greece (disambiguation)
