= Aglossa rubralis =

Scientific classification
- Kingdom: Animalia
- Phylum: Arthropoda
- Clade: Pancrustacea
- Class: Insecta
- Order: Lepidoptera
- Family: Pyralidae
- Genus: Aglossa
- Species: A. rubralis

Binomial name
- Aglossa rubralis Hampson, 1900

Synonyms
- Aglossa pinguinalis f. lateritialis Turati, 1921; Aglossa pinguinalis f. lividalis Turati, 1921

Species of moth

Aglossa rubralis is a species of snout moth in the genus Aglossa. It was described by George Hampson in 1900 and is known from Syria and Libya.

== Taxonomy ==
The species was formerly treated as a synonym of Aglossa pinguinalis.
