= Greasy =

Greasy may refer to:

- Greasy, Oklahoma, United States, a census-designated place
- Greasy Creek (disambiguation), various streams in the United States
- Greasy Neale (1891–1973), American football coach
- Greasy Sae, a character in the novel The Hunger Games
- Greasy, a character in the film Who Framed Roger Rabbit

== See also ==
- Cressida cressida, a swallowtail butterfly species also called the "big greasy"
- Acraea andromacha, a butterfly species also known as the "little greasy"
- Grease (disambiguation)
- Greaser (disambiguation)
- Greece
