= Aglossa asiatica =

Scientific classification
- Kingdom: Animalia
- Phylum: Arthropoda
- Clade: Pancrustacea
- Class: Insecta
- Order: Lepidoptera
- Family: Pyralidae
- Genus: Aglossa
- Species: A. asiatica

Binomial name
- Aglossa asiatica Erschoff, 1872

Synonyms
- Aglossa maceralis Chrétien, 1891; Aglossa pinguinalis var. abdidalis Christoph, 1873; Aglossa asiatica indistincta Corbet & Tams, 1943; Aglossa abdidalis Christoph, 1873

Species of moth

Aglossa asiatica is a species of snout moth in the genus Aglossa. It was described by Nikolay Grigoryevich Erschoff in 1872. It is found in Uzbekistan, Syria, Iran, Pakistan and on Crete and Cyprus.

== Taxonomy ==
It is sometimes listed as a subspecies of Aglossa pinguinalis.
