= Belt (clothing) =

Worn band or braid, usually around the waist or hips

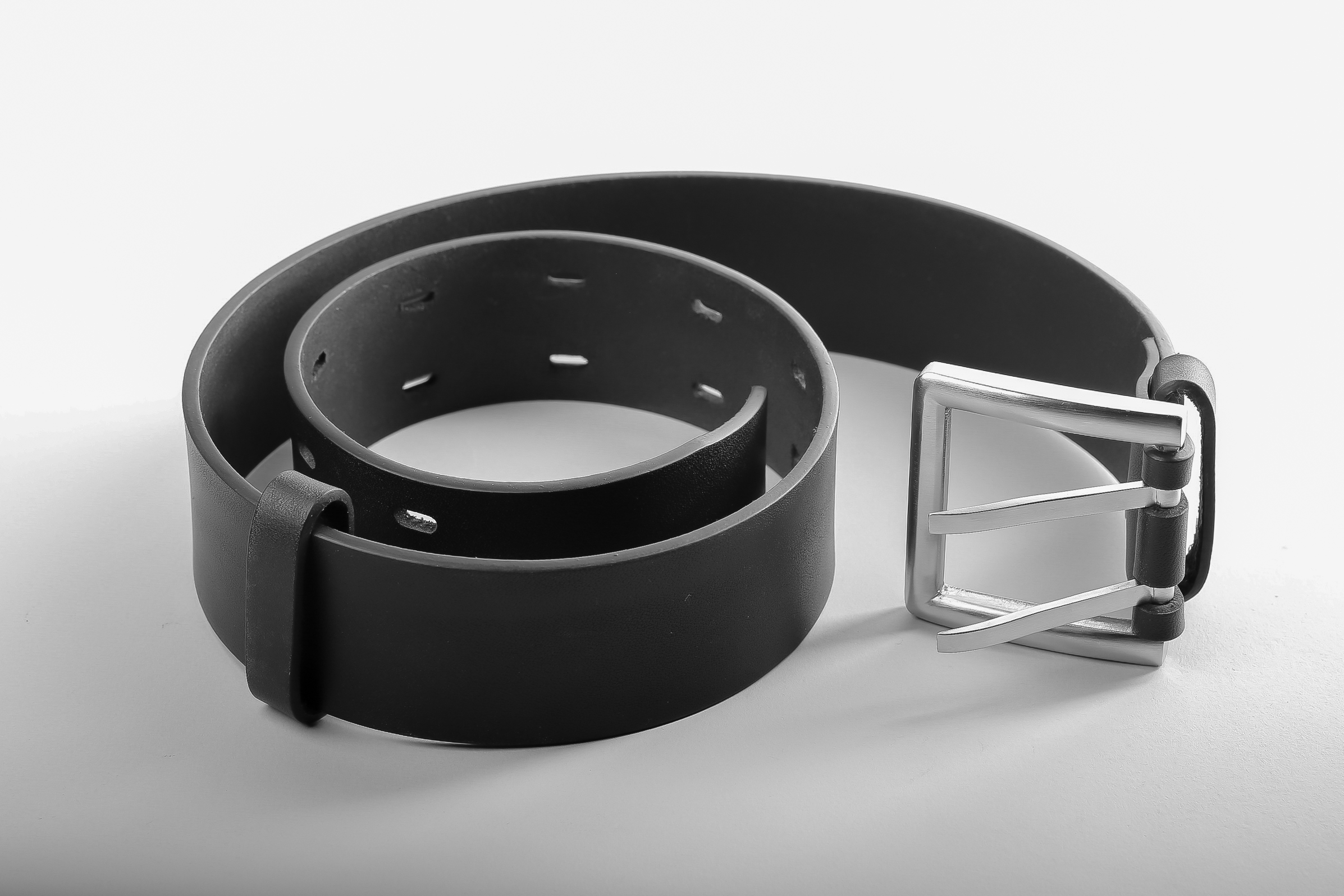
A common black leather belt with a metal buckle

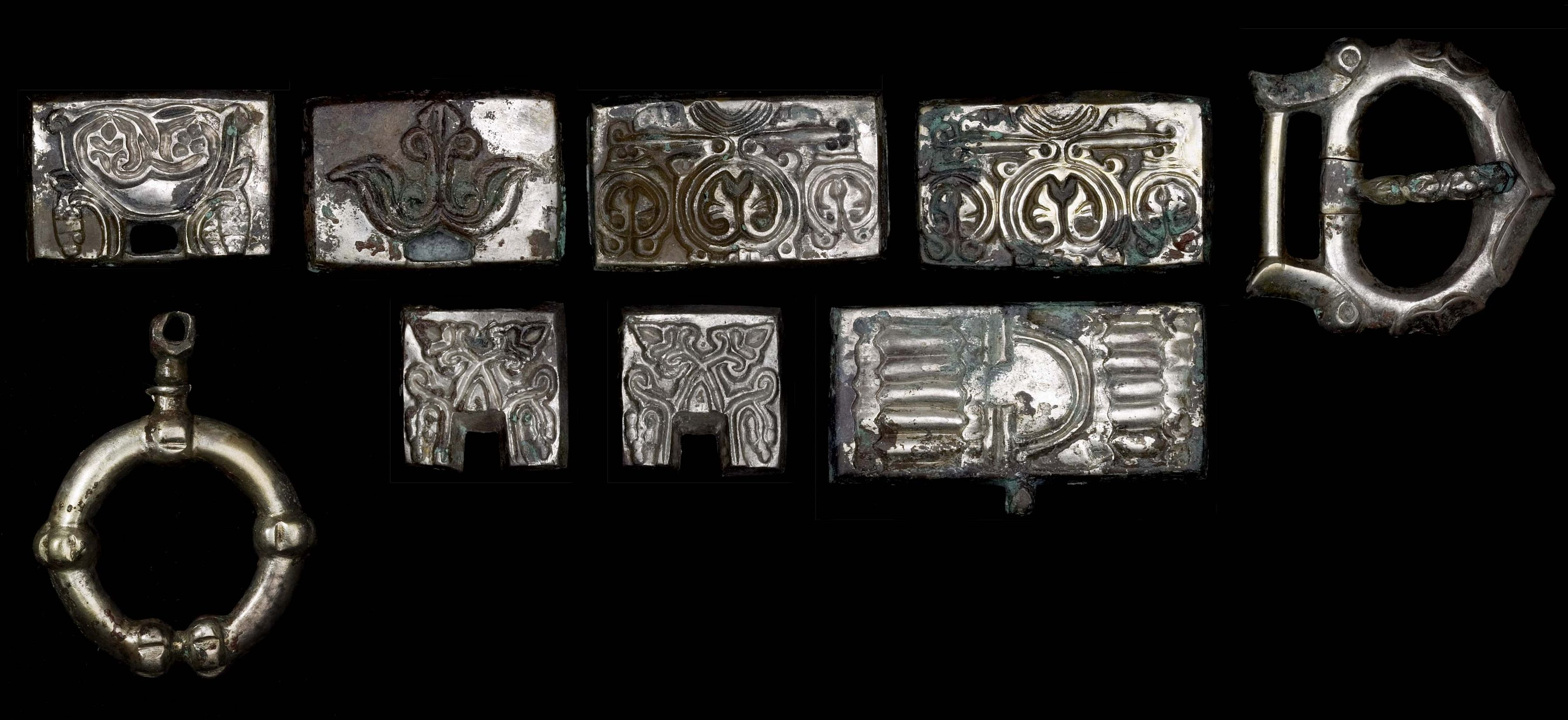
Medieval Islamic belt fittings, Eastern Iran, 900 AD (Khalili Collection)

A belt is a flexible band or strap, typically made of leather, plastic, or heavy cloth, worn around the natural waist or near it (as far down as the hips). Belts are worn to keep clothing in place or for aesthetic reasons. The ends of a belt are free, and a buckle is often used to form the belt into a loop by securing one end to another part of the belt, at or near the other end, though they may also be without a buckle and be simply tied using some form of knot. Often, the resulting loop is smaller than the hips. Belts come in many lengths because of the variety in waist sizes. Belt buckles can often be adjusted to suit the wearer's waist circumference.

Belts can also be used as whipping weapons in fighting and corporal punishment. Notably, belts are associated with parents using them on children for physical discipline which sometimes leads to belts used as a symbol of child abuse.

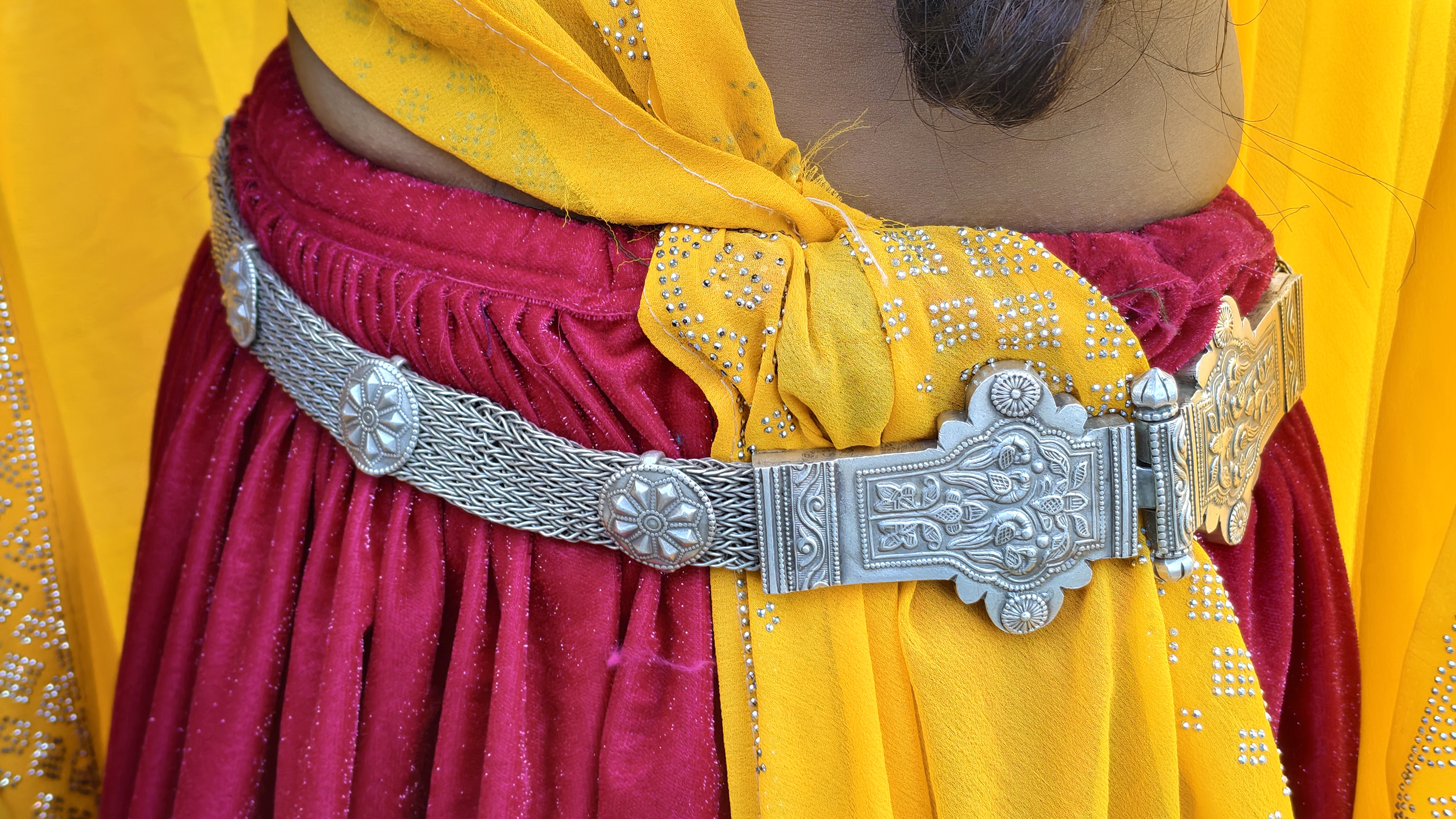
Traditional silver waist belt worn by a Bhil community woman, Jhabua, India

== Description ==
Belts are used variously to secure or hold up clothing, such as trousers, shorts, and skirts; to carry objects, such as tools and weapons; and to define or accentuate the waist.

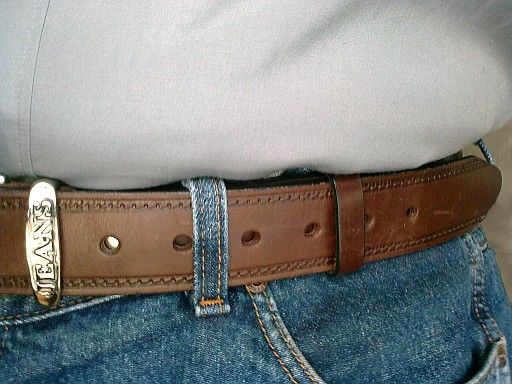
A belt being worn on trousers. Three kinds of belt loops are visible: a loop sewn to the garment itself (middle), a keeper loop affixed to the belt (left), and a freely detachable loop (right)

Some garments have a series of belt loops at the waist, through which a belt can be threaded. Additionally, many belts have a "keeper loop" affixed to one end, near the buckle. The keeper loop stops the free end of the belt from flapping around once the belt is buckled. Some belts also have an end tip (made of metal or leather) covering the free end of the belt to protect it from damage.

On dresses, robes, jumpsuits, and gowns, belts do not hold up the garment but may draw in its waist and define or accentuate it. These garments, because they maintain their position on the body by hanging from the shoulders or by friction against the torso, do not need belts in order to stay up. The breadth of belts worn with such garments need not be limited by the size of belt loops: some wide belts called waist cinchers overlap with corsets in appearance and function.

Belts that do hold up clothing work by friction and often take advantage of the narrow circumference (and the compressibility) of the torso above the hips. (Suspenders, also used to hold up such clothing as trousers, rely not on friction, compression, and the waist–hip proportion, but on maintaining distance between the shoulders of the wearer and the waist of the garment: the garment is held up by suspension (hanging), without need for the friction and compression of a belt; and the same principle applies in bib overalls. A garter belt (also called a suspender belt) employs both methods: the belt maintains its position on the body by friction and/or compression at or near the waist and/or by being smaller than the hips, and it maintains stockings' position on the legs by suspension. A sock garter works in the same way as a suspender belt, but for one leg only, the upper band of the garter being worn around the thigh or the calf, rather than the waist. A plain garter, a band worn on one leg to hold up hosiery, works like a belt, using friction and compression.)

Belts often are used as fashion accessories, with many colours, styles, and finishes. In heavy metal subculture, bullet belts and studded belts are worn. Belt buckles, often made of metal, vary from simple, one-color finishes to elaborately decorated belt plates with embossed or bas-relief images or multicolored logos. Pouches to carry objects, such as coin purses, holsters, scabbards, and inrōs, can be attached to belts and used instead of a garment's pockets. Many belts are marketed for one sex or the other, despite their universal functionality.

== History ==
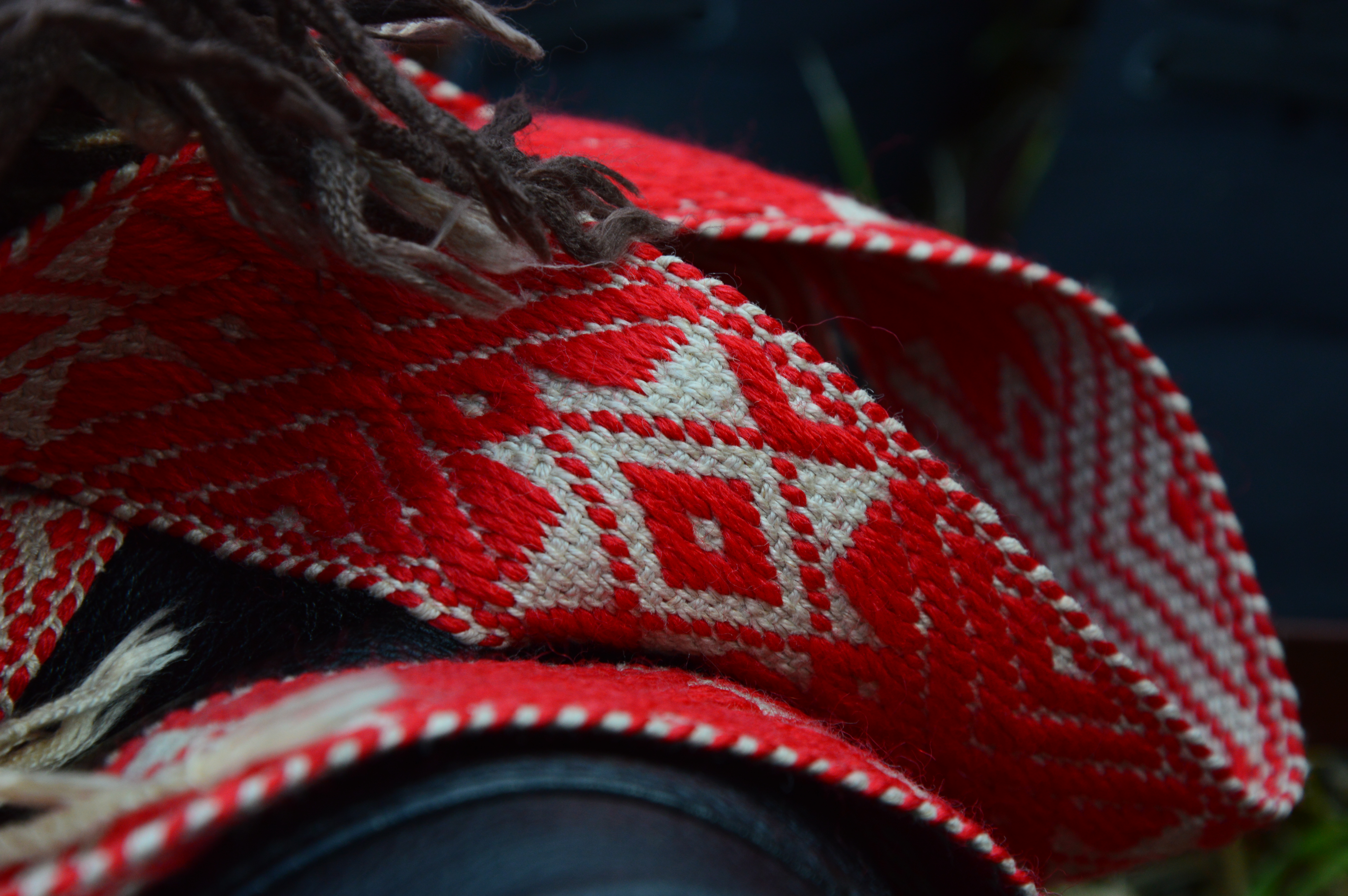
Pattern on a cloth belt that is part of one Estonian national costume.

Belts have been documented as male clothing since the Bronze Age. Both sexes have used them off and on, depending on the fashion trends. In the western world, belts have been more common for men, with the exception of the early Middle Ages, late 17th century Mantua, and skirt/blouse combinations between 1901 and 1910. Art Nouveau belt buckles are now collector's items. In the latter half of the 19th century and until the First World War, the belt was a decorative as well as utilitarian part of military uniform, particularly among officers. In the armed forces of Prussia, Tsarist Russia, and other Eastern European nations, it was common for officers to wear wide belts around the waist, on the outside of the uniform, both to support a saber and for aesthetic reasons. These tightly cinched belts served to draw in the waist and give the wearer a trim physique, emphasizing wide shoulders and a pouting chest. Often the belt served only to emphasize the waist made small by a corset worn under the uniform, a practice which was common especially during the Crimean Wars and was often noted by soldiers from the Western Front. Political cartoonists of the day often portrayed the tight waist-cinching of soldiers to comedic effect, and some cartoons survive showing officers being corseted by their inferiors, a practice which was uncomfortable but was deemed to be necessary and imposing.

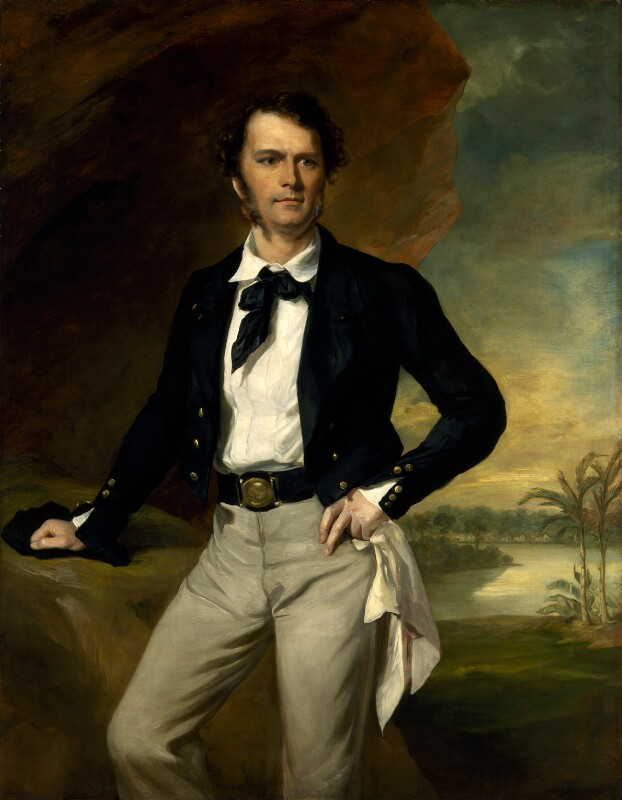
Sir James Brooke as Rajah of Sarawak, depicted wearing a belt. Portrait of Sir James Brooke by Francis Grant, 1847

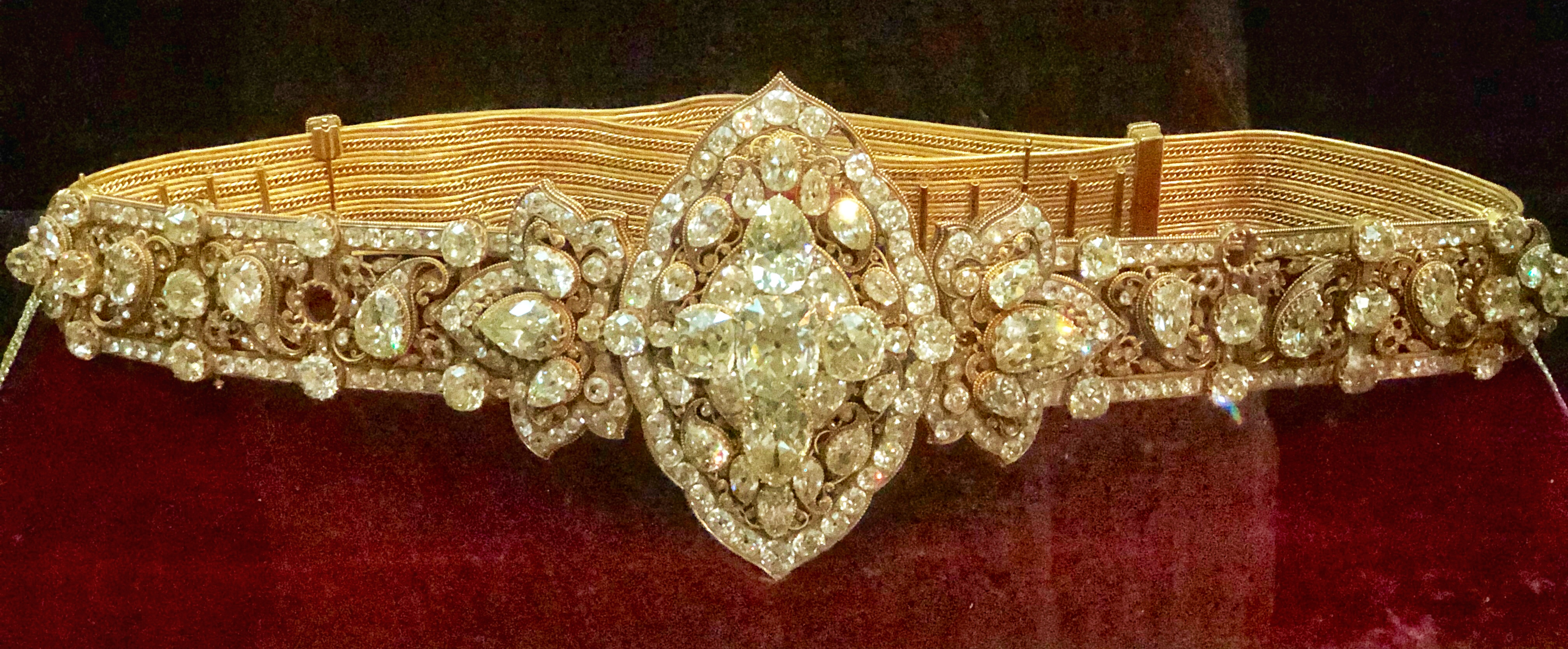
Made of rock cut diamonds embedded on a gold belt.

In modern times, men started wearing belts in the 1920s, as trouser waists fell to a lower line. Before the 1920s, belts served mostly a decorative purpose, and were associated with the military. Moreover, prior to that trousers did not even have belt loops. As sportswear, trousers with belt loops were already present in the 19th century. Today it is common for men to wear belts with their trousers. In the US military belts are worn snugly at dress events or at inspection so as convey impressions of fitness and discipline. From 1989 onward the US military standards regarding belt tightness during normal duty and non-duty activities have been somewhat more relaxed to prevent deleterious effects of prolonged excessive abdominal constriction.

In some countries, a father's belt could be associated with corporal punishment. As belts are constructed out of materials like leather that are both strong and light, a belt can be easily wielded to produce intense pain by using it as a whip to strike the buttocks of a misbehaving child. Moreover, belts were convenient disciplinary tools, as they are generally immediately available for use. The belt can symbolize fatherly authority and paternal responsibility for one's children's behavior and moral development, but corporal punishment is not recommended for use in modern society as it was in the past.

Since the 1980s and more commonly in the mid-1990s, the practice of sagging the pants, in which the waistbands (usually secured by a cinched belt) of trousers or (typically long) shorts are worn at or below the hips, thereby exposing the top part of any underwear not obscured by an upper-body garment, has been seen among young men and boys. This practice is believed to have originated with prison gangs and the prohibition of belts in prison (due to their use as weapons and as devices for suicide) -- historically, including in the latter part of the 20th century, gang-affiliated young men and boys were expected to wear their belts fastened tightly.

== Materials ==
Leather is the most popular belt material because it can withstand being bent, folded, and tightened without being damaged. Genuine leather belts will also adapt to the wearer with time. Belts are also made using a range of other materials, including braided leather, tooled leather, suede, leather-backed ribbon, canvas, webbing, rope and vinyl.

== Fashion and formality ==
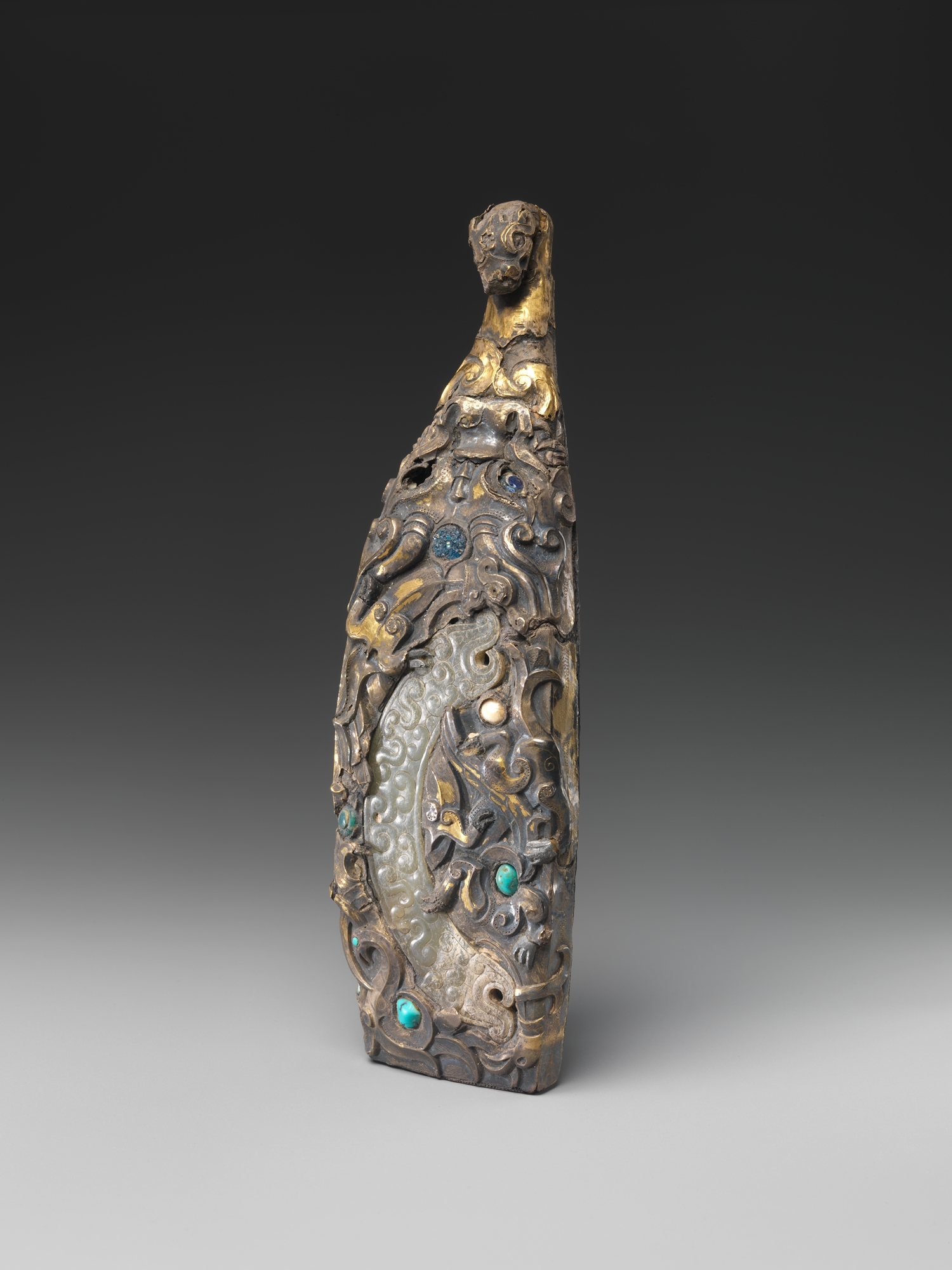
Bronze jade belt hook, Warring States period

Belts have transformed from a strictly utilitarian item, to a fashion accessory in today's modern era. There are several unspoken rules for belts when it comes to belt shape and color, especially for men wearing suits. Outside of workwear in certain professions, the choice of belt is usually rooted in fashion trends rather than necessity.

=== Formal ===
Belts for formal dress pants/attire are usually 28–32 mm wide (a little under 1 1/4 inch). These belts offer specialty accents such as trapunto straps, beveled edges, fine stitch gauge, and a tapered tip. The leather, if it is made of leather, is commonly in a semi or high-shine finish (ex: spazzolato leather), with a tight grain, and a smooth leather backing. Dress belts typically have a buckle in a polished metal finish.

=== Casual ===
Casual belts commonly worn with denim are usually between 35 mm and 42 mm wide (a little under 1 1/2 inch). These are typically made out of a one-piece leather construction with a textured appearance, with a belt buckle in an antiqued finish, wider, thicker stitching, or bar-tacking, to ensure a strong construction.

=== Black leather studded belts and wristbands in rock culture ===
Black leather studded belts and studded black leather wristbands are generally seen as synonymous with punk rock and punk rockers. However, the studded belt and its relative, the studded wristband, stretches further back to the bikers of the fifties. They initially studded their leather belts and leather jackets as a form of intimidation aimed upon the observer. This made the impression that these items were meant to be used as weapons by the wearer. This idea stylistically informed the gangs of greasers in the (U.S.), the rocker subculture in the (U.K.), as well as the gangs of Australian rockers that had grown from the earlier bodgies and widgies movement. These sub cultural groups had a fairly similar affiliation with 1950s rock and roll music and that gave these groups a comparable style identity.

It was during latter half of the 1970s that punks adopted this fashion for the same reasons as earlier rocker movements. After the style became a part of punk's threatening character, the studs itself went through a metamorphosis and assumed a myriad of new styles and uses. Including the use of dog collars around the neck, extensive studding on black leather belts, wristbands and jackets. The studs had their shapes change in various styles, including the pyramid shape and long elongated studs. These variants were also embraced by the post-punk movement, the goths and heavy metal devotees, as part of their own endorsed repertoire.

In 1973, before punk rock began, female hard rocker and glam rock musician, Suzi Quatro wore a black leather studded wristband with complimentary black studded choker to go with her black leather outfit for the musical film clip, Can the Can. However, she did not wear the black leather studded belt with them.

Black leather studded belts has not had the same stigma or negative effect on society since the mid 1980s, nevertheless, they are still keenly worn today by emo fans and fans of revivalist movements that began in the 1990s decade, emulating past traditions.

== Gallery ==
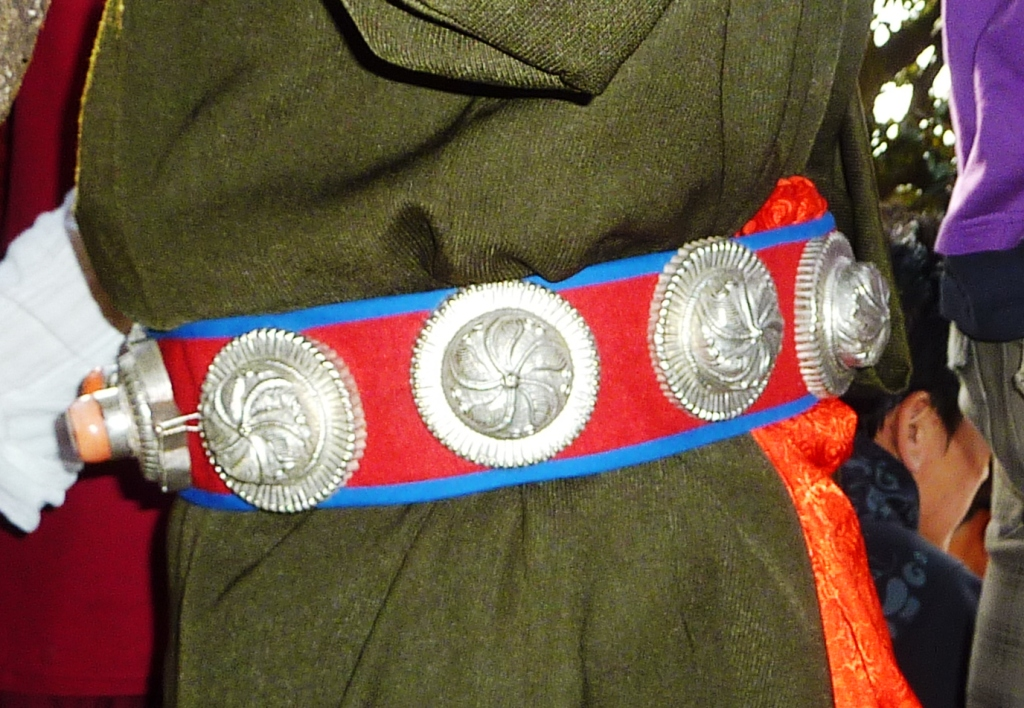
Tibetan woman's traditional studded belt at TCVs 50th anniversary. 2010

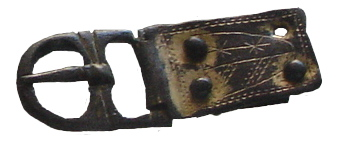
Belt buckle

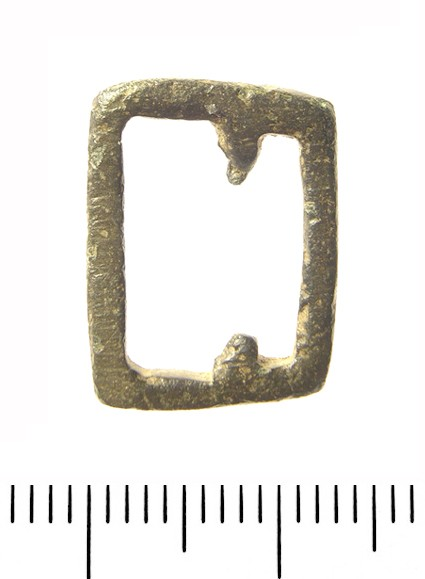
Belt buckle loop

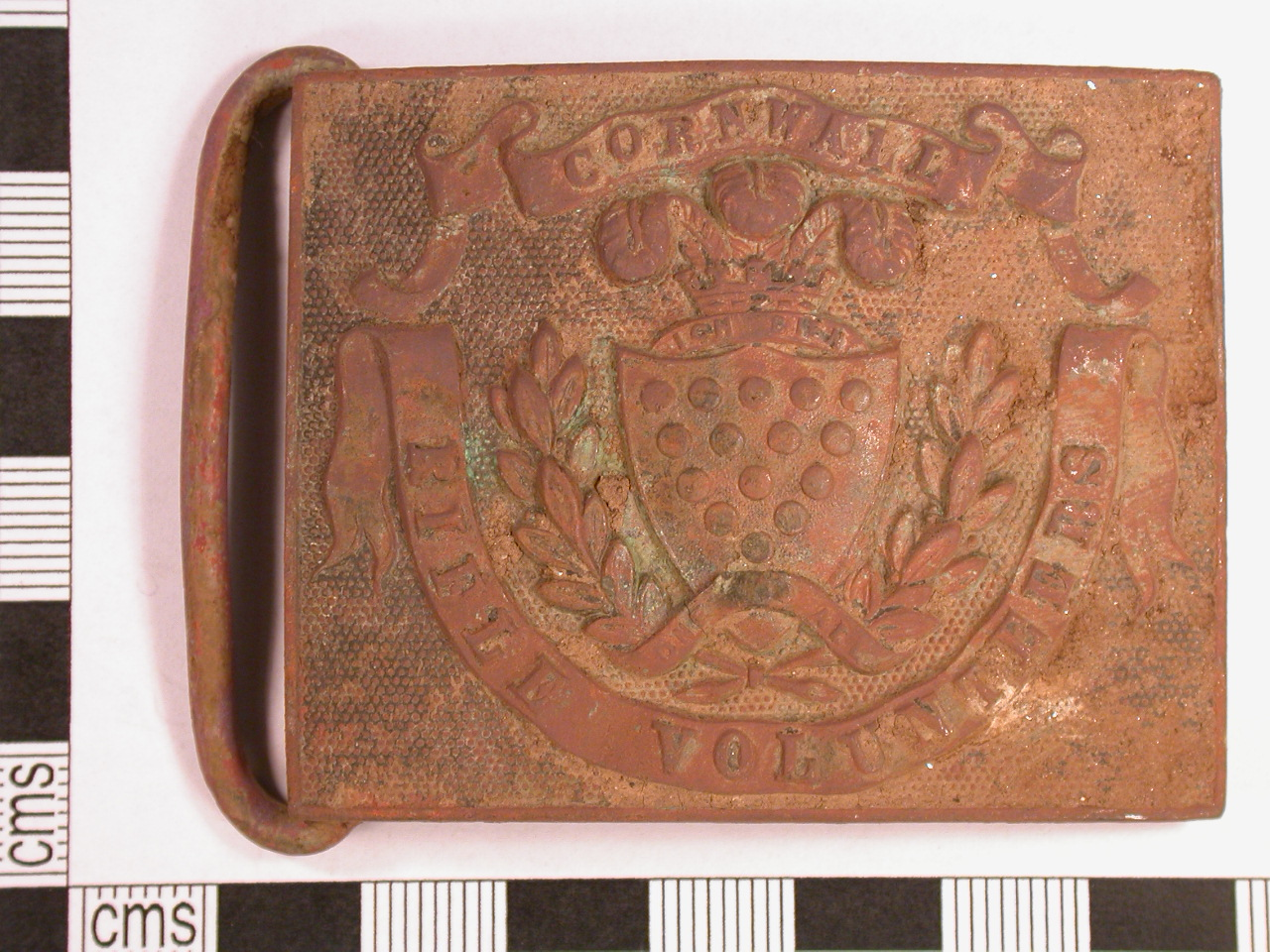
Belt plate

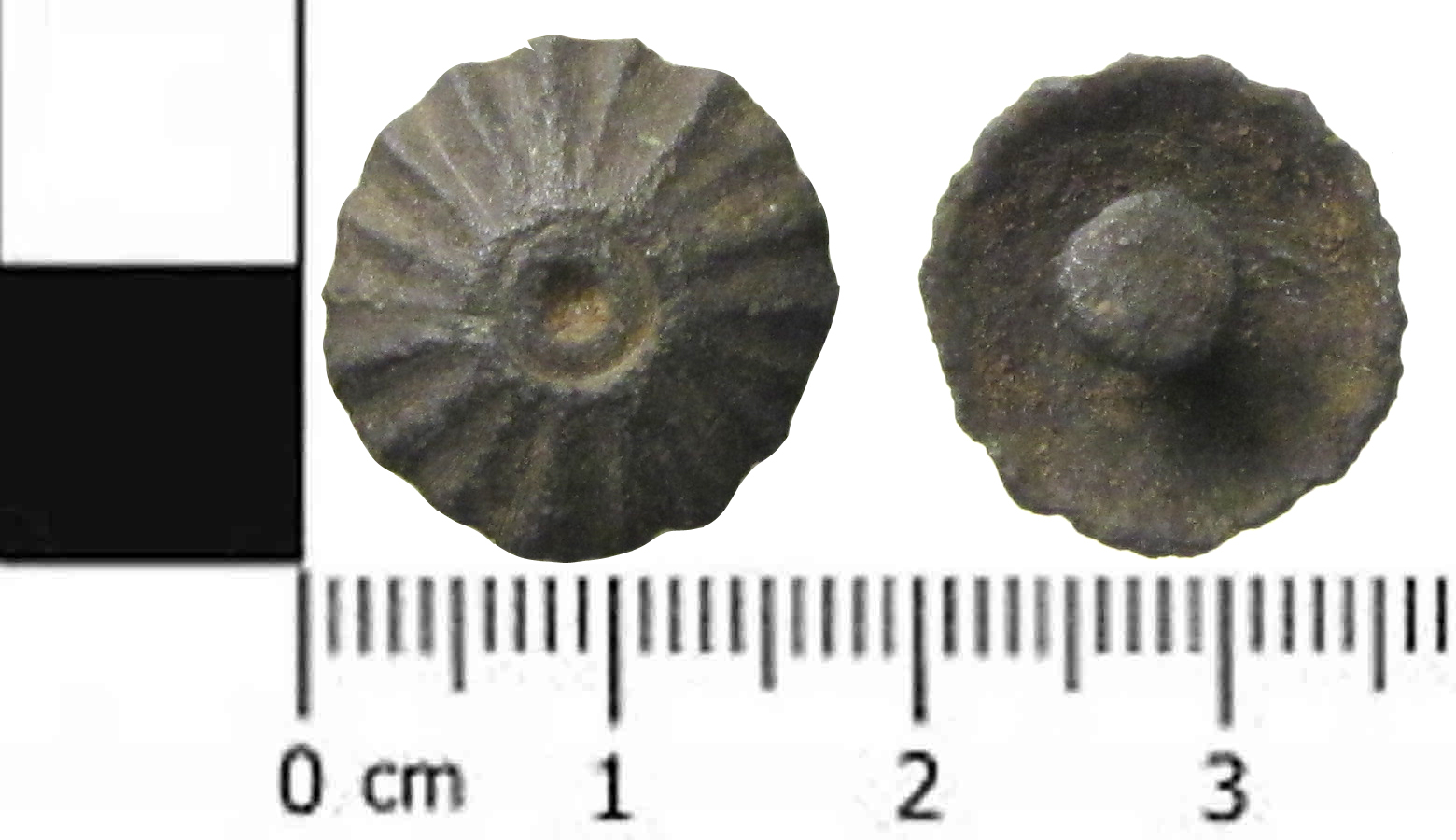
Belt stud

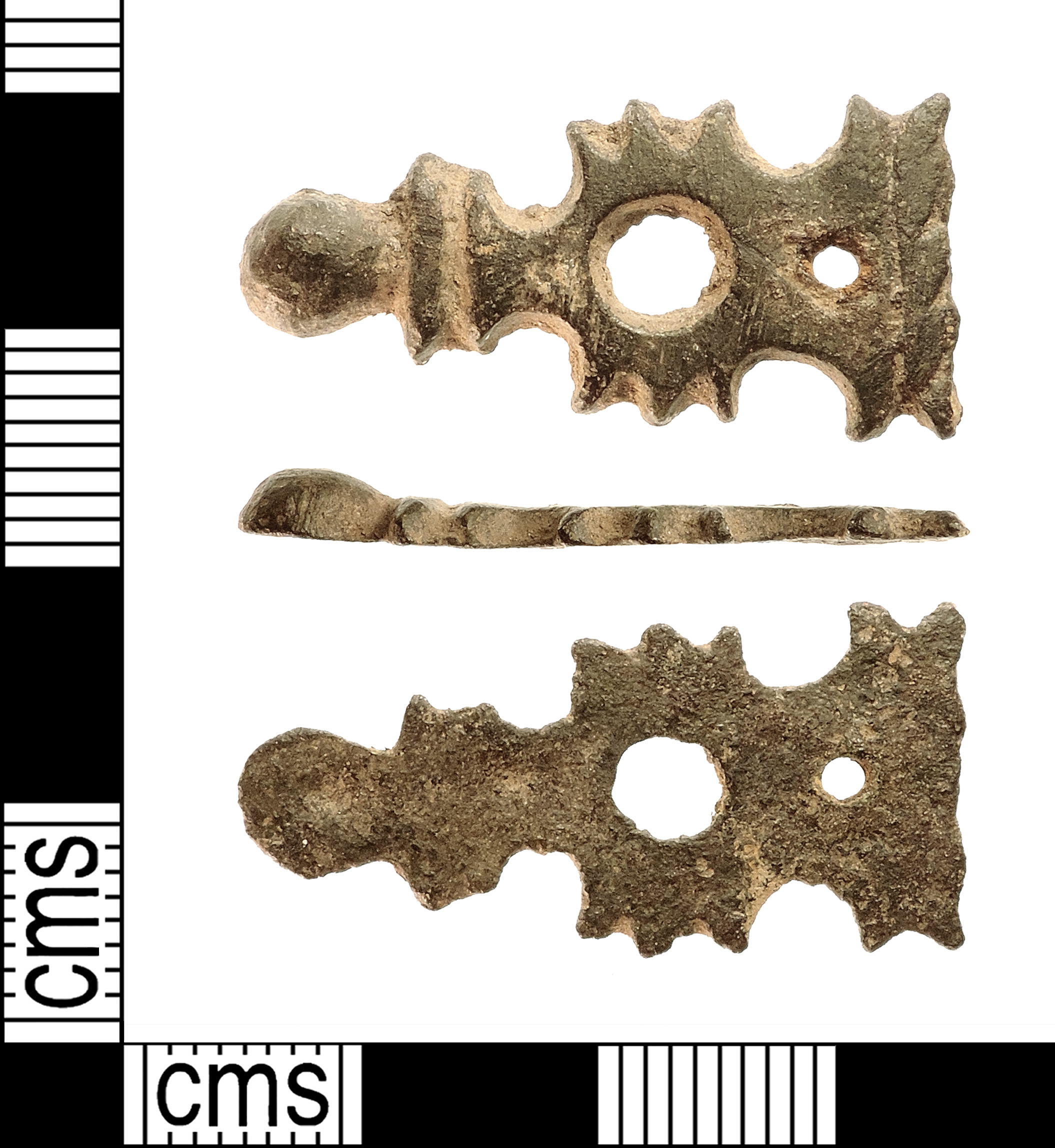
Belt fitting

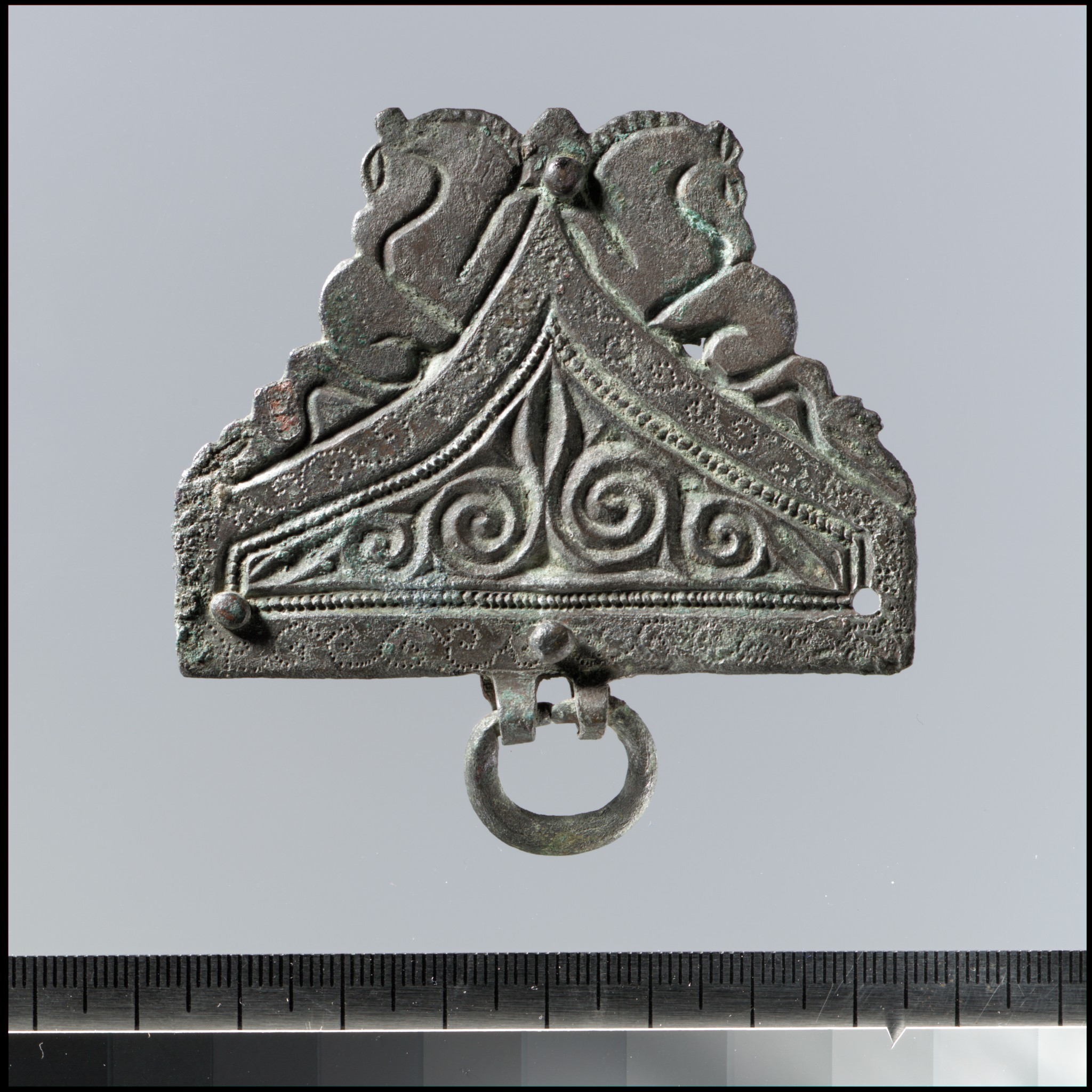
Belt mount

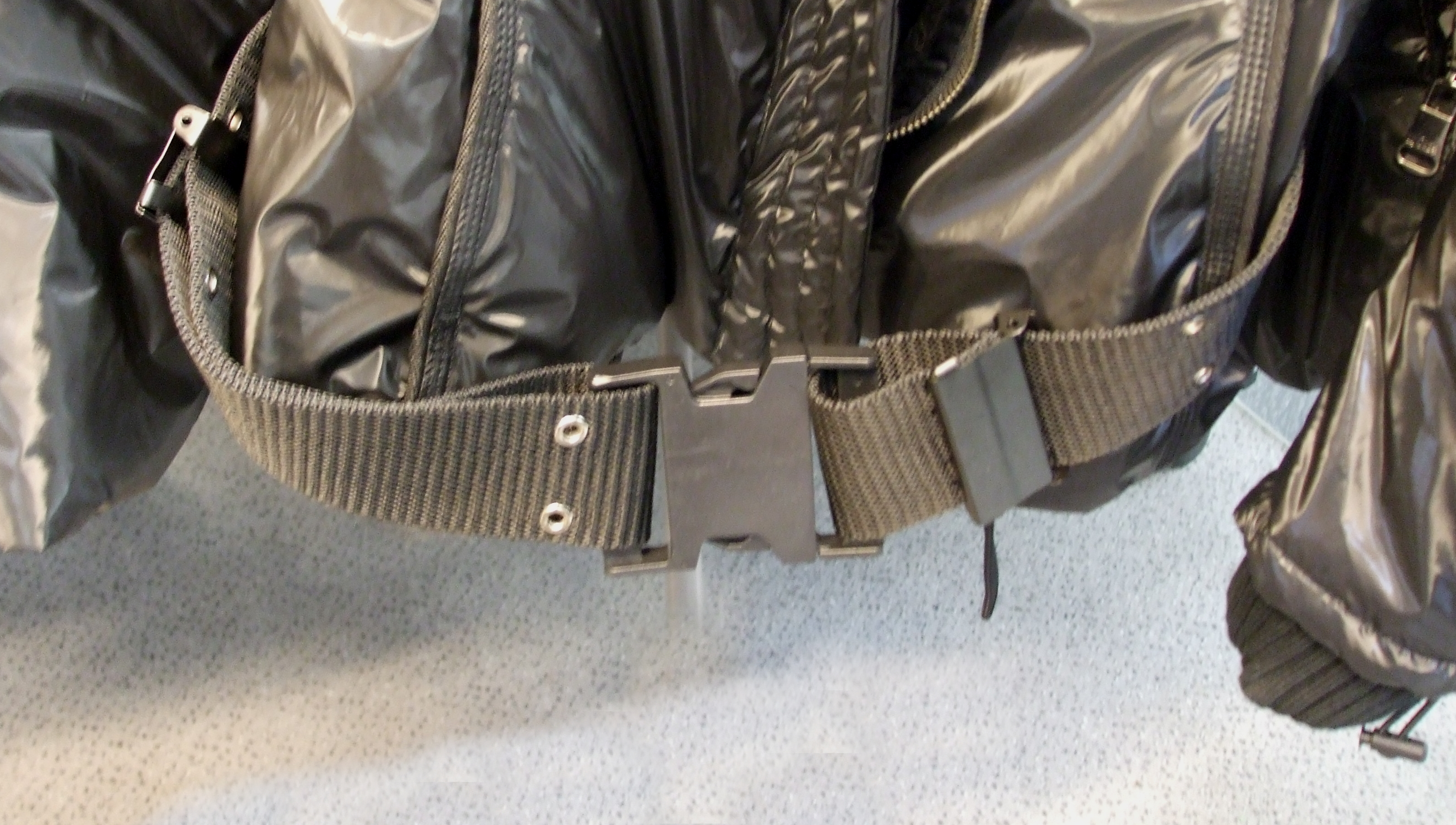
Webbing belt

== See also ==
- Armband
- Bandolier
- Baldric
- Belt buckle
- Belting (beating)
- Black belt (martial arts)
- Championship belt
- Cummerbund
- Drawstring
- Girdle
- Haramaki (clothing)
- Martingale (clothing), a half-belt in the back of the garment
- Obi
- Sam Browne belt
- Sansabelt
- Sash
- Stable belt
- Strap
- Waistband
