= Aglossa brabanti =

Scientific classification
- Kingdom: Animalia
- Phylum: Arthropoda
- Clade: Pancrustacea
- Class: Insecta
- Order: Lepidoptera
- Family: Pyralidae
- Genus: Aglossa
- Species: A. brabanti

Binomial name
- Aglossa brabanti Ragonot, 1884

Species of moth

Aglossa brabanti is a species of snout moth in the genus Aglossa. It was described by Ragonot in 1884, and is known from France and the Iberian Peninsula.

The wingspan is about 20 mm.
