= Aglossa micalialis =

Scientific classification
- Kingdom: Animalia
- Phylum: Arthropoda
- Clade: Pancrustacea
- Class: Insecta
- Order: Lepidoptera
- Family: Pyralidae
- Genus: Aglossa
- Species: A. micalialis

Binomial name
- Aglossa micalialis Walker, 1859

Species of moth

Aglossa micalialis is a species of snout moth in the genus Aglossa. It was described by Francis Walker in 1859 and is known from Shanghai, China.
