= Aglossa phaealis =

Scientific classification
- Kingdom: Animalia
- Phylum: Arthropoda
- Clade: Pancrustacea
- Class: Insecta
- Order: Lepidoptera
- Family: Pyralidae
- Genus: Aglossa
- Species: A. phaealis

Binomial name
- Aglossa phaealis Hampson, 1906

Species of moth

Aglossa phaealis is a species of snout moth in the genus Aglossa. It was described by George Hampson in 1906 and is known from Lesotho and Namibia.
