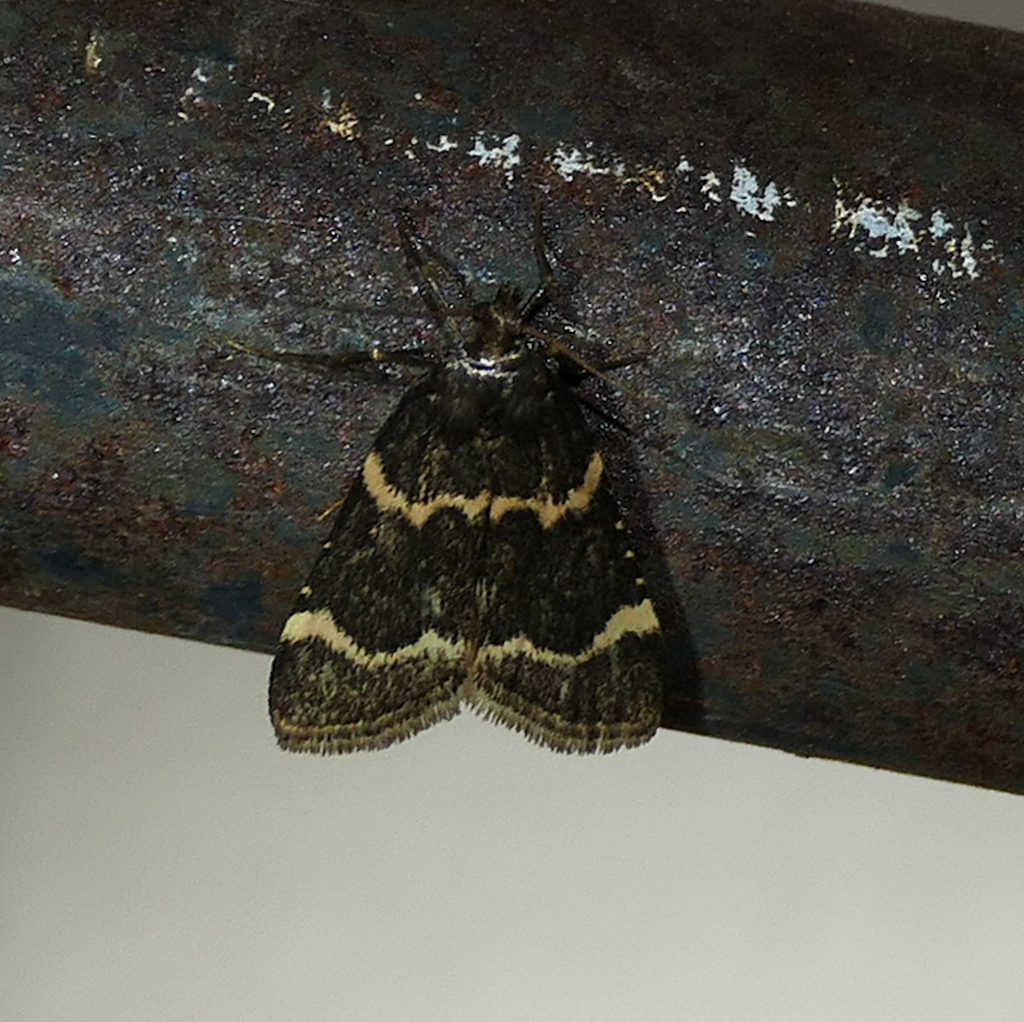

Scientific classification
- Kingdom: Animalia
- Phylum: Arthropoda
- Class: Insecta
- Order: Lepidoptera
- Family: Pyralidae
- Genus: Aglossa
- Species: A. baba

Binomial name
- Aglossa baba Dyar, 1914

= Aglossa baba =

Species of moth

Aglossa baba is a species of snout moth in the genus Aglossa. It was described by Harrison Gray Dyar Jr. in 1914. It is found in North America, including the type location of Texas.
