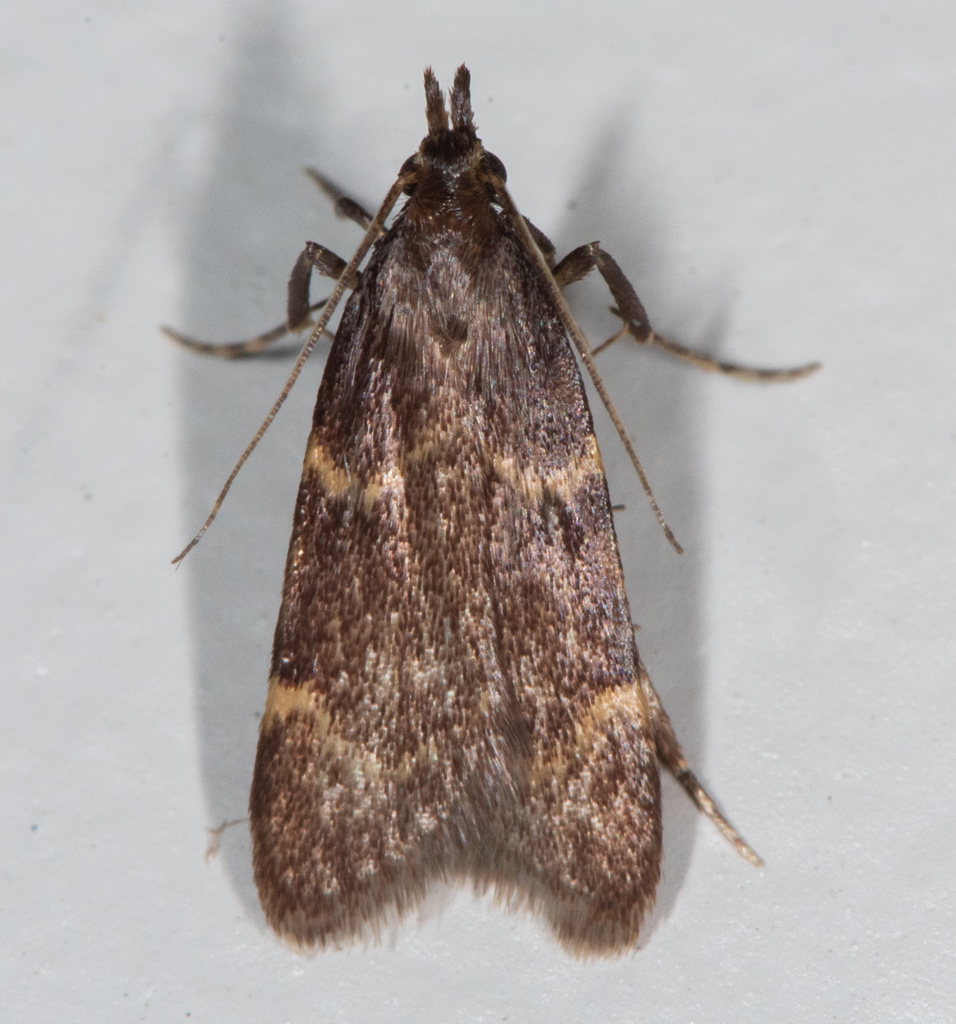

Scientific classification
- Domain: Eukaryota
- Kingdom: Animalia
- Phylum: Arthropoda
- Class: Insecta
- Order: Lepidoptera
- Family: Pyralidae
- Genus: Aglossa
- Species: A. electalis

Binomial name
- Aglossa electalis Hulst, 1866

= Aglossa electalis =

Species of moth

Aglossa electalis is a species of snout moth in the genus Aglossa. It was described by George Duryea Hulst in 1866. It is found in California, United States.

The wingspan is about 27 mm.
