= Martingale (clothing) =

Strap on a coat or dress

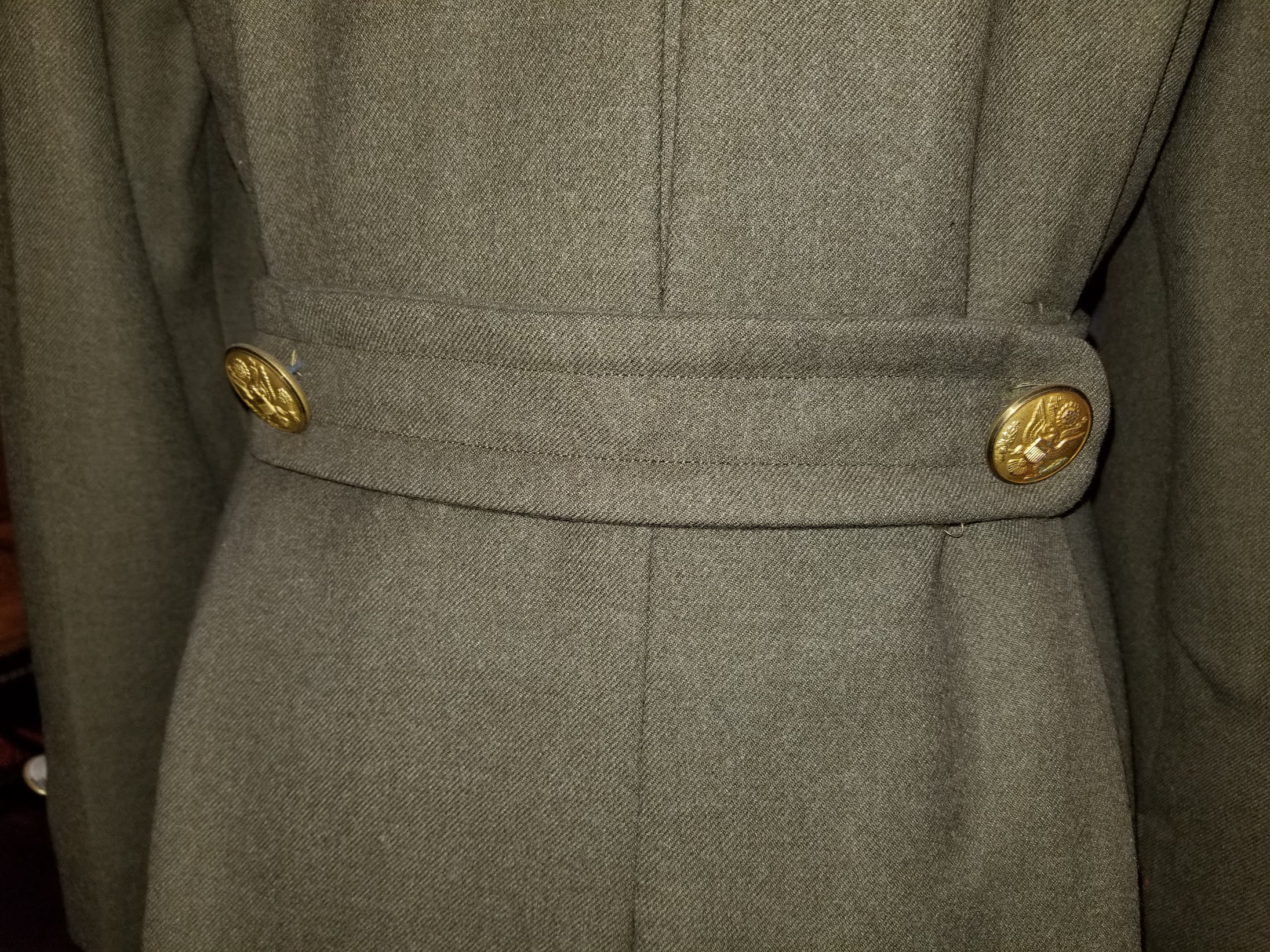
Martingale (US Women's Army Corps winter overcoat, WWII era)

A martingale (also martingale belt) is a strap on a dress or a half-belt on a coat or a jacket, used to adjust the fullness of the cloth.

The martingale is typically attached to the piece of clothing by buttons. In a military overcoat, a martingale is a common and practical feature, as a pleated coat can be spread out as a blanket once the strap is unfastened.

== Etymology ==
The name comes from a martingale strap used in the horse tack to restrict the movements of the horse's head; another theory suggests that the martingale coat originated in the 15th–16th centuries when a design of a man's martingale breeches included a flap between the legs buttoned to the belt in the back.

The word martingale comes from Occitan: martegalo through French: martingale. The Occitan word is a feminine version of "from Martigues", where martingale breeches with (in the words of Rabelais) "a drawbridge on the ass that makes excretion easier" supposedly originated. It is also possible that the association between the pants and inhabitants of Martigues is due to the latter having a reputation for naiveté and extravagance.

== History ==
In France, martingale breeches were apparently popular, being worn by Francis I of France, "mignons" of the royal court, and Rabelais' Panurge.

The first use of the martingale in a woman's dress dates to 1951 (Christian Dior at the autumn Paris Fashion Week). The strap was placed between the shoulder blades, and since then martingales have been used by couturiers everywhere, but avoiding the waistline.Martingale coats became fashionable for women post-war in 1950s and are still being made for men.

== Sources ==
- Yarwood, Doreen (1983). "Martingale". The Encyclopedia of World Costume. Charles Scribner's Sons. pp. 281–282. ISBN 0-684-15805-1. OCLC 1076697295.
- Picken, Mary Brooks (24 July 2013). "martingale". A Dictionary of Costume and Fashion: Historic and Modern. Courier Corporation. pp. 221–. ISBN 978-0-486-14160-2. OCLC 1045146863.
- Mansuy, Roger (17 October 2022). "The Origin and Multiple Meanings of Martingale". In Laurent Mazliak; Glenn Shafer (eds.). The Splendors and Miseries of Martingales: Their History from the Casino to Mathematics. Springer Nature. pp. 3–14. ISBN 978-3-03-105988-9. OCLC 1348287402.
- Hill, Daniel Delis (13 January 2022). "Women's Outwear 1940-1960". History of World Dress and Fashion, Second Edition. Daniel Delis Hill. p. 620. ISBN 978-0-9864254-9-3.
- McNab, Chris (20 November 2012). "Overcoat". Hitler's Eagles: The Luftwaffe 1933–45. Bloomsbury Publishing. p. 92. ISBN 978-1-78200-311-3. OCLC 1021810785.
- Lewandowski, Elizabeth J. (2011). The Complete Costume Dictionary. Scarecrow Press. p. 188. ISBN 978-0-8108-4004-1. OCLC 1039651491.
- Mansuy, Roger (2009). "The Origins of the Word "Martingale"" [Original publication "Histoire de martingales" in French in 2005 in Mathématiques et Sciences Humaines] (PDF). Electronic Journ@l for History of Probability and Statistics. 5 (1): 1–10.
