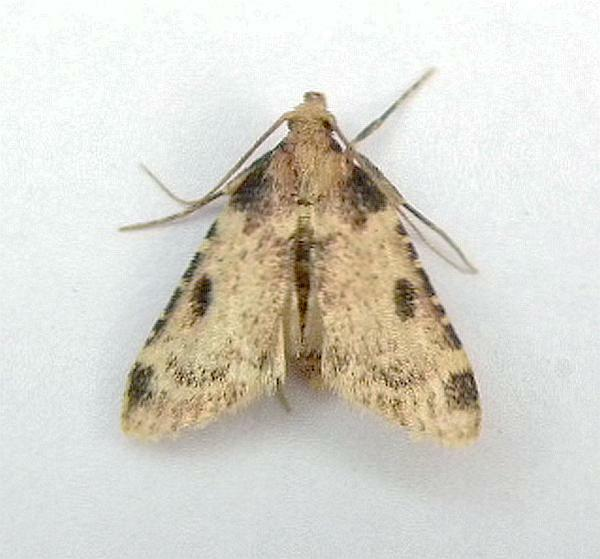

Scientific classification
- Kingdom: Animalia
- Phylum: Arthropoda
- Class: Insecta
- Order: Lepidoptera
- Family: Pyralidae
- Genus: Aglossa
- Species: A. costiferalis

Binomial name
- Aglossa costiferalis (Walker, 1866)

Synonyms
- Pyralis costiferalis Walker, 1866; Pyralis costigeralis Walker, [1865] (preocc. Walker, 1862)

= Aglossa costiferalis =

Species of moth

Aglossa costiferalis is a species of snout moth in the family Pyralidae. It was described by Francis Walker in 1866. It is found in eastern North America.
