= Aglossa exsucealis =

Scientific classification
- Kingdom: Animalia
- Phylum: Arthropoda
- Clade: Pancrustacea
- Class: Insecta
- Order: Lepidoptera
- Family: Pyralidae
- Genus: Aglossa
- Species: A. exsucealis

Binomial name
- Aglossa exsucealis Lederer, 1863

Synonyms
- Aglossa ommatalis Hampson, 1906

Species of moth

Aglossa exsucealis is a species of snout moth in the genus Aglossa. It was described by Julius Lederer in 1863 from Beirut, Lebanon. It is also found on Cyprus.

== Subspecies ==
- Aglossa exsucealis exsucealis
- Aglossa exsucealis ommatalis (Hampson, 1906) (Cyprus)
