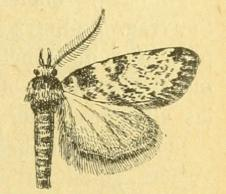

Scientific classification
- Kingdom: Animalia
- Phylum: Arthropoda
- Clade: Pancrustacea
- Class: Insecta
- Order: Lepidoptera
- Family: Pyralidae
- Genus: Aglossa
- Species: A. rabatalis

Binomial name
- Aglossa rabatalis (de Joannis, 1923)

Synonyms
- Agriope rabatalis de Joannis, 1923; Aglossa atlassica Schmidt, 1934; Aglossa ifniensis Schmidt, 1934

= Aglossa rabatalis =

Species of moth

Aglossa rabatalis is a species of snout moth in the genus Aglossa. It was described by Joseph de Joannis in 1923 and is known from Morocco and France.

The wingspan is about 18 mm.
