= Aglossa tanya =

Scientific classification
- Kingdom: Animalia
- Phylum: Arthropoda
- Clade: Pancrustacea
- Class: Insecta
- Order: Lepidoptera
- Family: Pyralidae
- Genus: Aglossa
- Species: A. tanya

Binomial name
- Aglossa tanya Corbet & Tams, 1943

Species of moth

Aglossa tanya is a species of snout moth in the genus Aglossa. It was described by Alexander Steven Corbet and Willie Horace Thomas Tams in 1943 and is known to originate from India.
