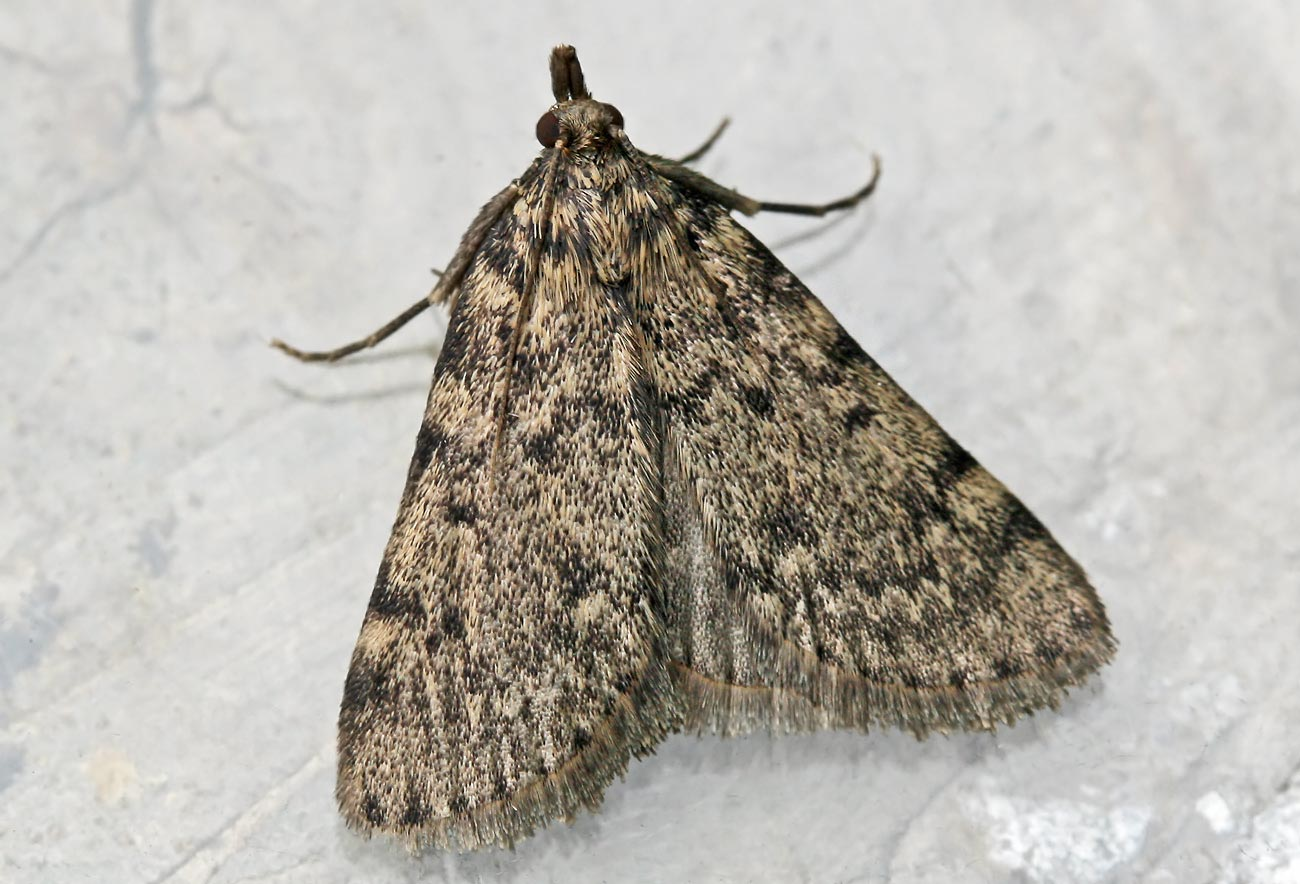
- Adult grease moth (A. pinguinalis)

Scientific classification
- Kingdom: Animalia
- Phylum: Arthropoda
- Clade: Pancrustacea
- Class: Insecta
- Order: Lepidoptera
- Family: Pyralidae
- Tribe: Pyralini
- Genus: Aglossa; Latreille, 1796

Species
- Numerous, see text

Synonyms
- Agriope Ragonot, 1894; Euclita Hübner, [1825]; Crocalia Ragonot, 1892; Oryctocera Ragonot, 1891

= Aglossa =

Genus of moths

Aglossa is a genus of small moths belonging to the family Pyralidae. It was described by Pierre André Latreille in 1796. They are found mainly in western Eurasia, though some species have been introduced elsewhere.

This genus is remarkable for the caterpillars, which in some species are able to feed on a wide range of materials that are not usually eaten by Lepidoptera larvae, such as dead insects, manure and straw. The caterpillars of other Aglossa (e.g. A. signicostalis) are myrmecophilous.

Adults of the grease moth (A. cuprina) sometimes eat fats such as suet.

== Species ==
- Aglossa acallalis Dyar, 1908
- Aglossa aglossalis
- Aglossa asiatica
- Aglossa aurocupralis
- Aglossa baba Dyar, 1914
- Aglossa brabanti Ragonot, 1884
- Aglossa cacamica (Dyar, 1913)
- Aglossa caprealis (Hübner, [1809]) – stored grain moth
- Aglossa capsalis
- Aglossa costiferalis (Walker, 1886)
- Aglossa cuprina (Zeller, 1872) – grease moth
- Aglossa dimidiatus (Haworth, 1809)
- Aglossa disciferalis (Dyar, 1908)
- Aglossa electalis Hulst, 1866
- Aglossa exsucealis
- Aglossa fumifusalis Hampson, 1916
- Aglossa furva Heinrich, 1931
- Aglossa gigantalis Barnes & Benjamin, 1925
- Aglossa gracilalis
- Aglossa humberti (Viette, 1973)
- Aglossa inconspicua Butler, 1875
- Aglossa incultalis Zeller, 1852
- Aglossa infuscalis Hampson, 1906
- Aglossa micalialis
- Aglossa mineti Leraut, 2006
- Aglossa obliteralis
- Aglossa ocellalis
- Aglossa oculalis Hampson, 1906
- Aglossa phaealis Hampson, 1906
- Aglossa pinguinalis (Linnaeus, 1758) – large tabby moth
- Aglossa pulveralis
- Aglossa rabatalis
- Aglossa republicana Kemal, Kızıldağ & Koçak, 2020
- Aglossa rhodalis Hampson, 1906
- Aglossa rubralis Hampson, 1900
- Aglossa signicostalis Staudinger, 1871
- Aglossa steralis Felder & Rogenhofer, 1875
- Aglossa subpurpuralis
- Aglossa suppunctalis
- Aglossa tanya
- Aglossa tenebrosalis Rothschild, 1915
- Aglossa thamii
- Aglossa tinealis
