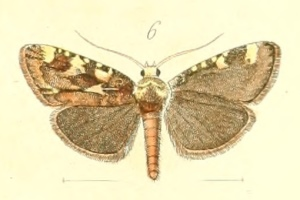

Scientific classification
- Kingdom: Animalia
- Phylum: Arthropoda
- Clade: Pancrustacea
- Class: Insecta
- Order: Lepidoptera
- Family: Pyralidae
- Genus: Aglossa
- Species: A. signicostalis

Binomial name
- Aglossa signicostalis Staudinger, 1871

Synonyms
- Aglossa nigripennis Turati, 1919; Aglossa signicostalis arcuatalis Zerny, 1914

= Aglossa signicostalis =

Species of moth

Aglossa signicostalis is a species of snout moth in the genus Aglossa. It was first described by Staudinger, in 1871, and is known from Israel, Italy, the Czech Republic, Slovakia, Hungary, Romania, Bulgaria, North Macedonia and Greece.

The wingspan is about 19 mm.
