= Sansabelt =

Brand of men's trousers

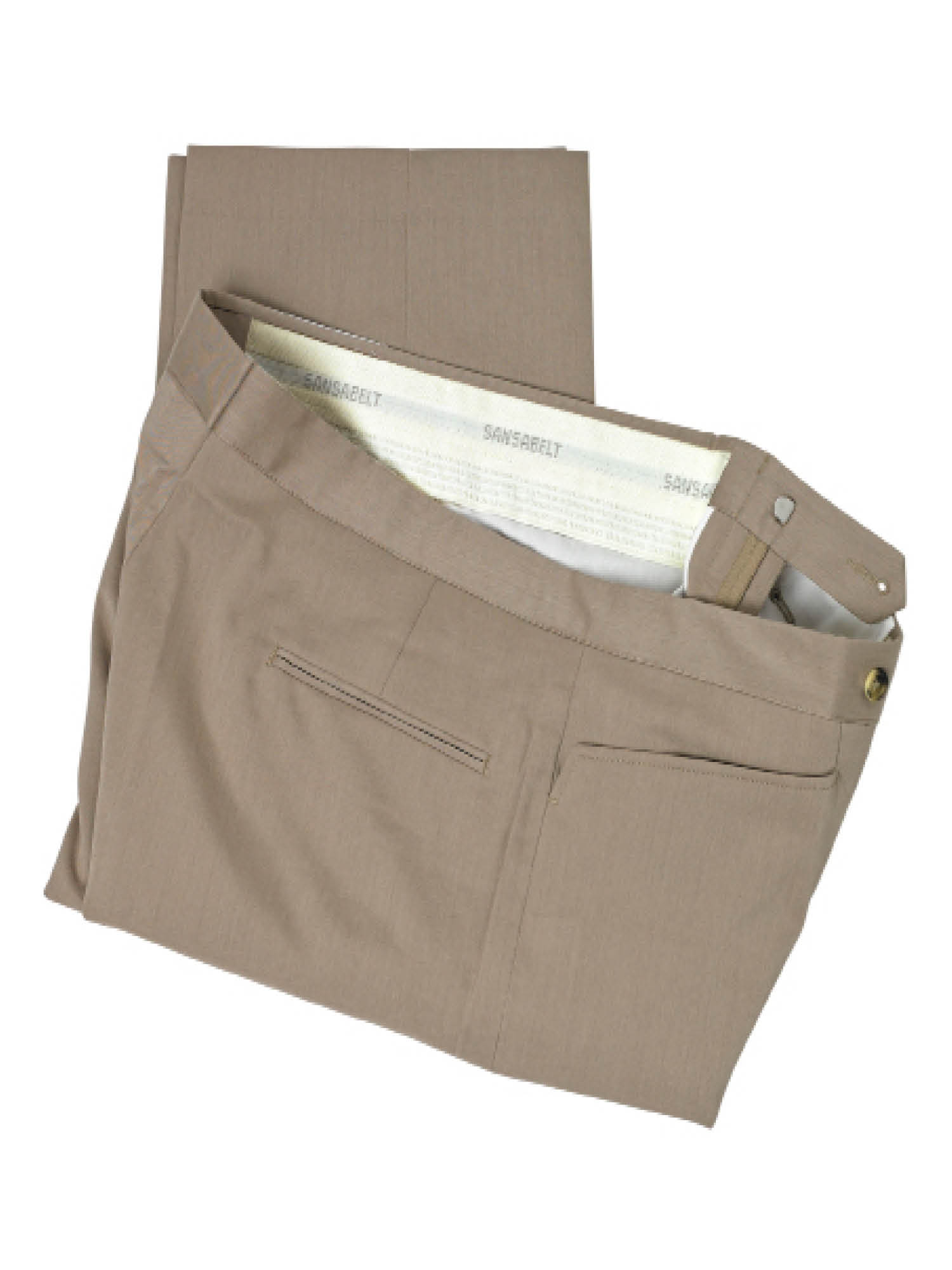

Sansabelt is a brand of men's trousers. The trousers have a wide webbed elastic band sewn into the waist, which is intended to make a belt or suspenders unnecessary, hence the name sans a belt. The slacks come in a classic fit with roomy legs in a dressy or dress casual fabric. Sansabelt slacks come in three styles—Western-top pockets with flat front, side pockets with flat front, and pleated with side pockets.

== History ==
The Sansabelt slack was invented by Edward Singer of Silver Manufacturing Company, located in East Chicago, Indiana, which subsequently sold the company and their patent to Jaymar-Ruby, an Indiana-based clothing company, in 1959. Jaymar-Ruby's Sansabelt brand was acquired by Hartmarx in 1967 and the last Sansabelt pants were produced in the early 1990s. On 24 January 2009, Hartmarx Corporation filed for Chapter 11 bankruptcy. Peter Schwadel, President of Monte Blue, Inc. purchased the license to Sansabelt in February 2013.

== See also ==
- Zubaz
