= Greasy Creek (McKenzie Creek tributary) =

Stream in the American state of Missouri

Greasy Creek is a stream in Wayne County in the U.S. state of Missouri. It is a tributary of McKenzie Creek.

The stream headwaters arise at 37°13′46″N 90°41′08″Wand the stream flows generally south to its confluence with McKenzie Creek at 37°11′19″N 90°41′50″W at an elevation of 607 feet (185 m). The stream mouth is about two miles north of Piedmont. An area in the upper reaches of the stream is impounded as Dover Lake.

Greasy Creek most likely was so named on account of the often muddy character of its water.

== See also ==
- List of rivers of Missouri
