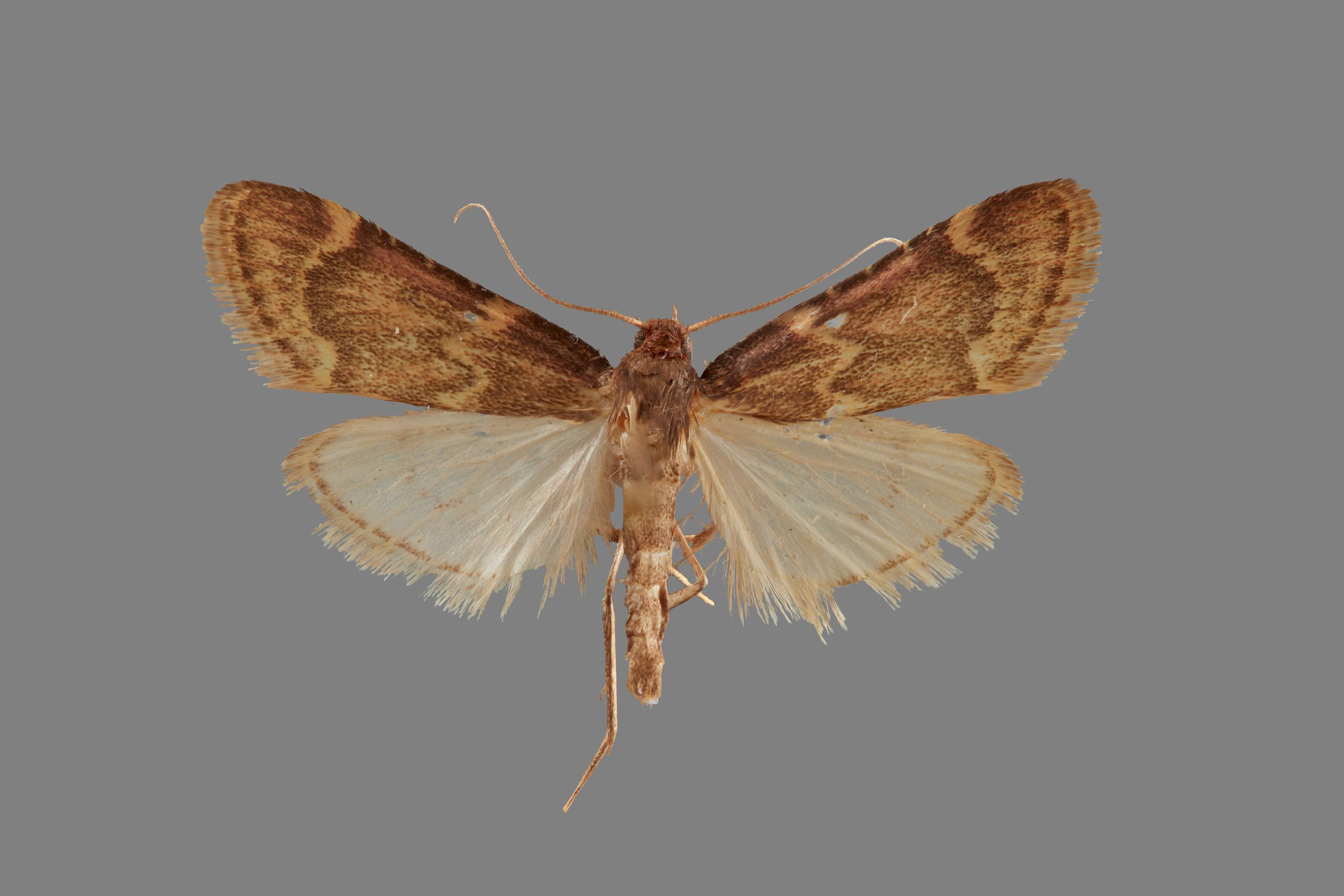

Scientific classification
- Kingdom: Animalia
- Phylum: Arthropoda
- Class: Insecta
- Order: Lepidoptera
- Family: Pyralidae
- Genus: Aglossa
- Species: A. cacamica

Binomial name
- Aglossa cacamica (Dyar, 1913)

Synonyms
- Pyralis cacamica Dyar, 1913

= Aglossa cacamica =

Species of moth

Aglossa cacamica is a species of snout moth in the genus Aglossa. It was described by Harrison Gray Dyar Jr. in 1913. It is found in North America, including California.

The wingspan is 22–34 mm.
