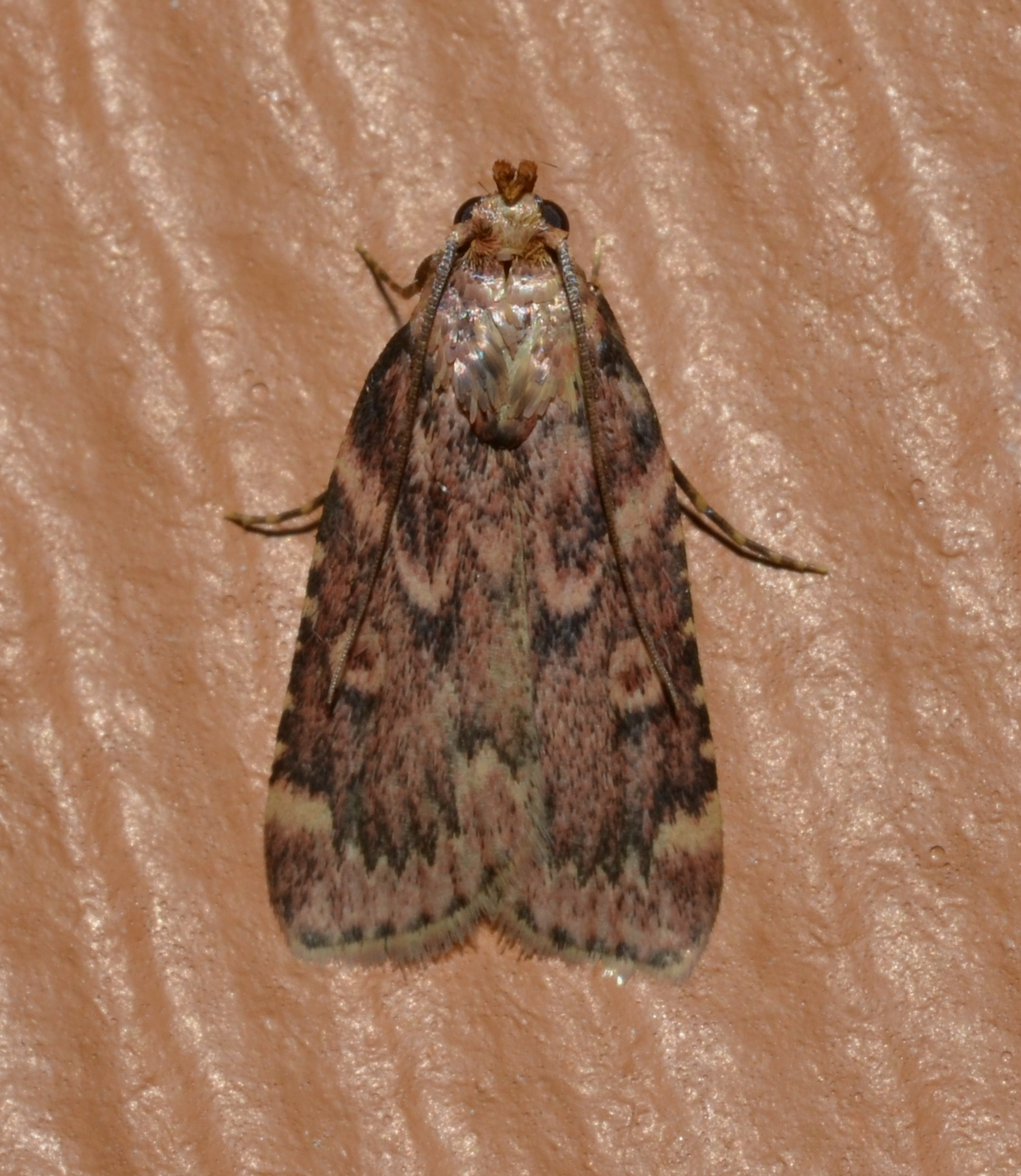

Scientific classification
- Kingdom: Animalia
- Phylum: Arthropoda
- Clade: Pancrustacea
- Class: Insecta
- Order: Lepidoptera
- Family: Pyralidae
- Genus: Aglossa
- Species: A. cuprina

Binomial name
- Aglossa cuprina (Zeller, 1872)

Synonyms
- Pyralis cuprina Zeller, 1872

= Aglossa cuprina =

Species of moth

Aglossa cuprina, the grease moth, is a snout moth, family Pyralidae, described by Philipp Christoph Zeller in 1872. The grease moth is closely related to the genus Pyralis, and as a result, is usually associated with the meal moth, Pyralis farinalis.

Aglossa cuprina ingests grease produced by the bacteria that feed on decaying matter.

== Taxonomy ==
A. cuprina was named by German entomologist Philipp Christoph Zeller in 1872. The specific epithet, A. pinguinalis, its other binomial name, is derived from the Latin, pinguinalis (greasy).

== Description ==
The egg of A. cuprina is an off white rounded oval. During the larval stage, A. cuprina has a brownish head and greyish body. The A. cuprina larvae also have black mandibles and a black peritreme (part of the integument of an insect which surrounds the spiracles). They can be distinguished from A. caprealis larvae by setal differences. The pupae are reddish brown with six curved, hooked setae.

The moth has a wingspan that averages about 1.8–2.7 cm (18–27 mm), and exhibits an overall dark, greyish-brown colour. While the forewings are brownish grey with pale yellowish markings (much like those of a tabby cat, hence the lesser-used common name), the top of the head and neck are simply pale yellow. A. cuprina is also known for its filiform (thread-like) antennae.

== Distribution ==
A. cuprina has been found in Europe, Asia, Australia, North America and South America. A. cuprina is distributed throughout eastern North America and sightings have been recorded in California, Arkansas, Arizona, Connecticut, the District of Columbia, Delaware, Florida, Illinois, Massachusetts, Maryland, Missouri, North Carolina, New Hampshire, New Jersey, New York, Pennsylvania, South Carolina, Texas and Wisconsin. The moth stage is generally found in early summer between the months of May and August.

They tend to inhabit areas around or in human habitation and buildings. When found in homes, they are generally found in the kitchen and more specifically in the pantry where their choice food source is stored. They are also commonly found in areas where dried grain products are stored, for example, warehouses and areas of grain elevators that remain undisturbed.

== Behaviour ==
Aglossa cuprina has similar feeding habits to those of the grains moths. The larval stages feed primarily on dried grain based products including corn meal, whole wheat flour, graham flour, granola, and dried oats. The adults feed on butter, suet and grease, and have even been found in excrement. They have been known to feed on dried remains of other insects as well. The adults fly at dusk between June and July. They hide in dark corners during the day and can be found in stables, outhouses, barns, warehouses, and cellars. They are also attracted to light and sugar.

== Forensic importance ==
A. cuprina is often involved in stored product entomology. Stored product entomologists often advise producers on ways to reduce the chances of insect infestation and thus remain under food defect action levels. A. cuprina is a common aspect of stored product entomology due to its caterpillars' feeding habits. Grease moth larvae infest dried grain products and as it feeds it produces a silken substance that intertwines with the surrounding product. With substantial infestations, the larvae will spread throughout the product and with them spread their silk rendering the product unsellable. Most infestations occur in products that are stored for long periods of time in storage facilities.

In addition to stored product entomology, recently evidence suggests that A. cuprina may soon play a role in forensic entomology. A. cuprina was recently found feeding on the greasy remains of a deceased individual. The use of A. cuprina as an insect of significant forensic importance is still being researched.

== Life cycle ==
Research on the species' life cycle has yet to be completed, but it has been shown to have a similar life cycle to that of Aglossa caprealis. A. caprealis lays an average of 60–300 eggs during a single reproductive cycle. The eggs are commonly laid on overhanging supports. The time it takes for the eggs to hatch is temperature dependent and take between 2–14 days to hatch.

Once the eggs have hatched, the larval stage will last 2–41 weeks before pupating. The larval stage prefers to live in dark secluded environments, and creates flexible tubular galleries. The galleries are supported by silken fibres produced by the larvae.

Prior to pupation, the larvae leave their galleries and disperse to a suitable location. They entangle themselves with a loose, tough silken cover that they interweave with nearby material. The nearby materials provide structure to the silken covering and camouflage the moth while it undergoes metamorphosis. The duration spent in each stage of development is temperature dependent. The life cycle of A. cuprina has been recorded to range from approximately twelve months to over two years depending on weather and temperature conditions. The imago, adult insect, stage emerges in early summer.

== Conservation status ==
=== NatureServe Status ===
Global Status: G4G5

Global Status (Rounded): G4

Global Status Last Reviewed: 2/4/2004
