= Aglossa furva =

Scientific classification
- Domain: Eukaryota
- Kingdom: Animalia
- Phylum: Arthropoda
- Class: Insecta
- Order: Lepidoptera
- Family: Pyralidae
- Genus: Aglossa
- Species: A. furva

Binomial name
- Aglossa furva Heinrich, 1931

Species of moth

Aglossa furva is a species of snout moth in the genus Aglossa. It was described by Carl Heinrich in 1931. It is found in North America, including the type location of British Columbia.
