= Aglossa dimidiatus =

Scientific classification
- Kingdom: Animalia
- Phylum: Arthropoda
- Clade: Pancrustacea
- Class: Insecta
- Order: Lepidoptera
- Family: Pyralidae
- Genus: Aglossa
- Species: A. dimidiatus

Binomial name
- Aglossa dimidiatus Haworth, 1809

Synonyms
- Crambus dimidiatus Haworth, 1809; Aglossa dimidialis Guenée, 1854

Species of moth

Aglossa dimidiatus is a species of snout moth in the genus Aglossa. It was described by Adrian Hardy Haworth in 1809 from London, Great Britain, but this is probably an accidental introduction. It is found in Gibraltar.
