= Aglossa tenebrosalis =

Scientific classification
- Domain: Eukaryota
- Kingdom: Animalia
- Phylum: Arthropoda
- Class: Insecta
- Order: Lepidoptera
- Family: Pyralidae
- Genus: Aglossa
- Species: A. tenebrosalis

Binomial name
- Aglossa tenebrosalis Rothschild, 1915

Species of moth

Aglossa tenebrosalis is a species of snout moth in the genus Aglossa. It was described by Walter Rothschild in 1915, and is known from Algeria.
