= Aglossa capsalis =

Scientific classification
- Kingdom: Animalia
- Phylum: Arthropoda
- Clade: Pancrustacea
- Class: Insecta
- Order: Lepidoptera
- Family: Pyralidae
- Genus: Aglossa
- Species: A. capsalis

Binomial name
- Aglossa capsalis (Chrétien, 1911)

Synonyms
- Agriope capsalis Chrétien, 1911

Species of moth

Aglossa capsalis is a species of snout moth in the genus Aglossa. It was described by Pierre Chrétien in 1911 and is known from Tunisia (it was described from Gafsa).
