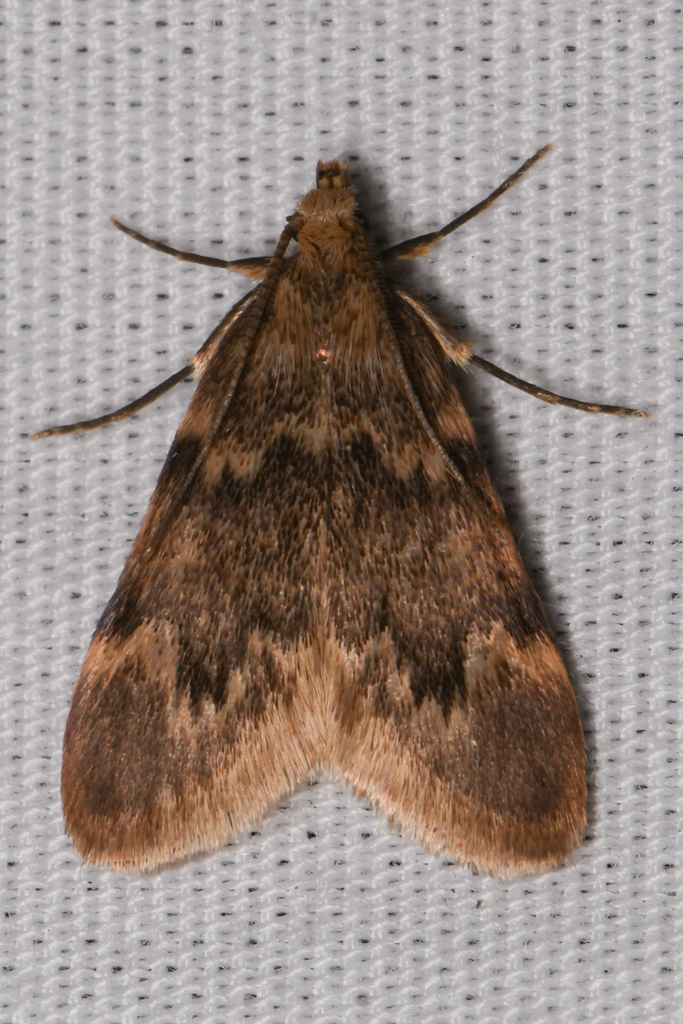

Scientific classification
- Kingdom: Animalia
- Phylum: Arthropoda
- Class: Insecta
- Order: Lepidoptera
- Family: Pyralidae
- Genus: Aglossa
- Species: A. acallalis

Binomial name
- Aglossa acallalis Dyar, 1908

= Aglossa acallalis =

Species of moth

Aglossa acallalis is a species of snout moth in the genus Aglossa. It was described by Harrison Gray Dyar Jr. in 1908. It is found in the United States in southern Arizona and California.
