= Aglossa thamii =

Scientific classification
- Kingdom: Animalia
- Phylum: Arthropoda
- Clade: Pancrustacea
- Class: Insecta
- Order: Lepidoptera
- Family: Pyralidae
- Genus: Aglossa
- Species: A. thamii

Binomial name
- Aglossa thamii Leraut, 2003

Species of moth

Aglossa thamii is a species of snout moth in the genus Aglossa. It was described by Patrice J.A. Leraut in 2003 and is known from Morocco.
