= Aglossa pulveralis =

Scientific classification
- Kingdom: Animalia
- Phylum: Arthropoda
- Clade: Pancrustacea
- Class: Insecta
- Order: Lepidoptera
- Family: Pyralidae
- Genus: Aglossa
- Species: A. pulveralis

Binomial name
- Aglossa pulveralis Hampson, 1900

Species of moth

Aglossa pulveralis is a species of snout moth in the genus Aglossa. It was described by George Hampson in 1900 and is known from Algeria.
