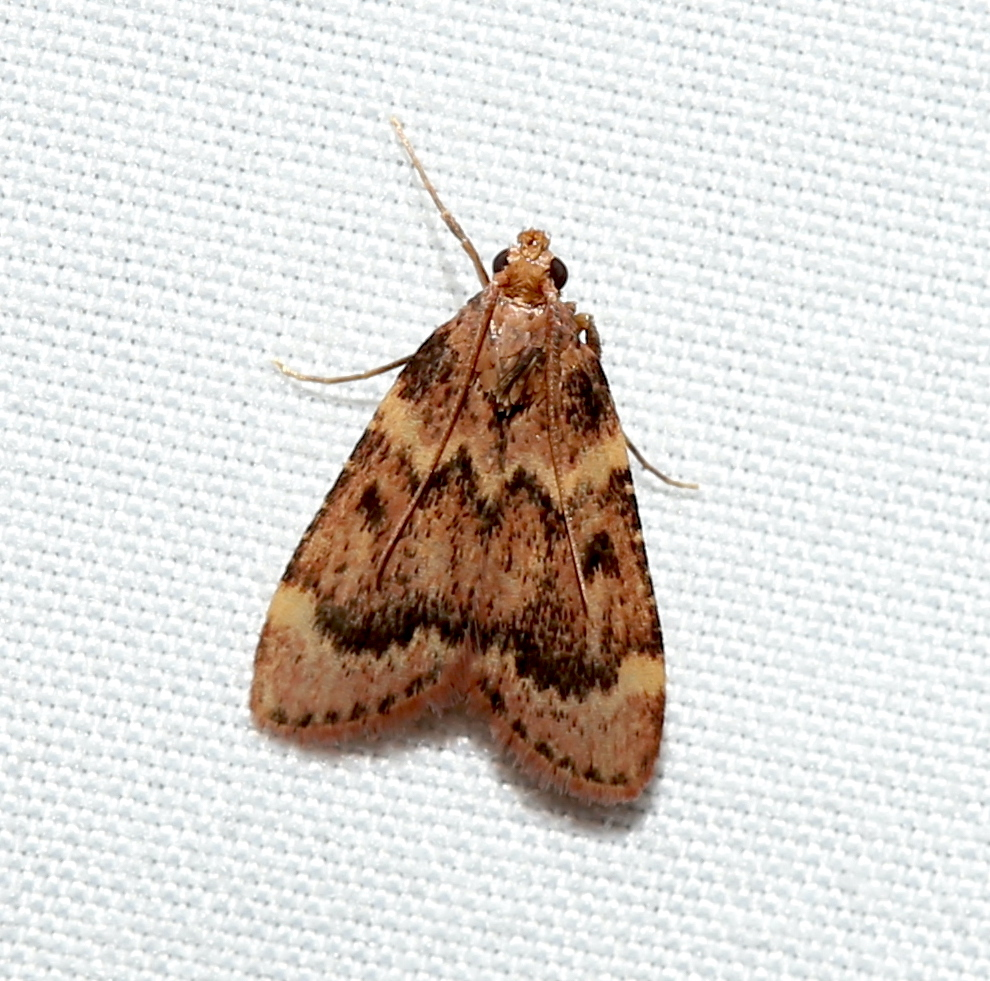

Scientific classification
- Kingdom: Animalia
- Phylum: Arthropoda
- Class: Insecta
- Order: Lepidoptera
- Family: Pyralidae
- Genus: Aglossa
- Species: A. disciferalis

Binomial name
- Aglossa disciferalis (Dyar, 1908)

Synonyms
- Pyralis disciferalis Dyar, 1908

= Aglossa disciferalis =

Species of moth

Aglossa disciferalis, also known as the Pink-masked Pyralid Moth, is a species of snout moth in the genus Aglossa. It was described by Harrison Gray Dyar Jr. in 1908. It is found in North America.

The wingspan is about 18 mm.
