= Aglossa aurocupralis =

Scientific classification
- Kingdom: Animalia
- Phylum: Arthropoda
- Clade: Pancrustacea
- Class: Insecta
- Order: Lepidoptera
- Family: Pyralidae
- Genus: Aglossa
- Species: A. aurocupralis

Binomial name
- Aglossa aurocupralis (Ragonot, 1891)

Synonyms
- Oryctocera aurocupralis Ragonot, 1891

Species of moth

Aglossa aurocupralis is a species of snout moth in the genus Aglossa. It was described by Ragonot, in 1891, and is known from South Africa.
