= Aglossa obliteralis =

Scientific classification
- Kingdom: Animalia
- Phylum: Arthropoda
- Clade: Pancrustacea
- Class: Insecta
- Order: Lepidoptera
- Family: Pyralidae
- Genus: Aglossa
- Species: A. obliteralis

Binomial name
- Aglossa obliteralis Turati, 1930

Species of moth

Aglossa obliteralis is a species of snout moth in the genus Aglossa. It was described by Turati, in 1930, and is known from Libya.
