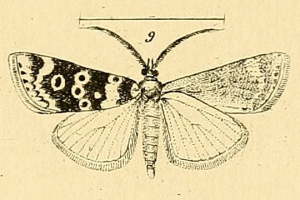

Scientific classification
- Kingdom: Animalia
- Phylum: Arthropoda
- Clade: Pancrustacea
- Class: Insecta
- Order: Lepidoptera
- Family: Pyralidae
- Genus: Aglossa
- Species: A. ocellalis

Binomial name
- Aglossa ocellalis Lederer, 1863

Synonyms
- Aglossa ocelliferalis Hampson, 1906; Pyralis circozyga Meyrick, 1937

= Aglossa ocellalis =

Species of moth

Aglossa ocellalis is a species of snout moth in the genus Aglossa. It was described by Julius Lederer in 1863 and is known from Uganda and the Democratic Republic of the Congo. There is one record of an accidental introduction from Scotland.
