= Aglossa subpurpuralis =

Scientific classification
- Kingdom: Animalia
- Phylum: Arthropoda
- Clade: Pancrustacea
- Class: Insecta
- Order: Lepidoptera
- Family: Pyralidae
- Genus: Aglossa
- Species: A. subpurpuralis

Binomial name
- Aglossa subpurpuralis (Chrétien, 1915)

Synonyms
- Agriope subpurpuralis Chrétien, 1915

Species of moth

Aglossa subpurpuralis is a species of snout moth in the genus Aglossa. It was described by Pierre Chrétien in 1915 and is known from Tunisia.
