= Grecia =

Grecia may refer to:

- Greece, in several Romance languages (Latin: Graecia)
- Grecia (magazine), literary magazine in Spain (1918–1920)
- Grecia (canton) (Spanish: Cantón de Grecia), third canton of the Costa Rican province of Alajuela
  - Grecia, Costa Rica, its capital city located in the first district (Distrito de Grecia)
  - Municipal Grecia, an association football club in Grecia
- Grecia (toucan), the first toucan to receive a prosthetic 3D printed beak
- Grecia Hamilton, Cuban shot putter

== See also ==
- Greece (disambiguation)
