= Aglossa gigantalis =

Scientific classification
- Domain: Eukaryota
- Kingdom: Animalia
- Phylum: Arthropoda
- Class: Insecta
- Order: Lepidoptera
- Family: Pyralidae
- Genus: Aglossa
- Species: A. gigantalis

Binomial name
- Aglossa gigantalis Barnes & Benjamin, 1925

Species of moth

Aglossa gigantalis is a species of snout moth in the genus Aglossa. It was described by William Barnes and Foster Hendrickson Benjamin in 1925 and is found in North America, including the type location of Arizona.
