= Aglossa steralis =

Scientific classification
- Kingdom: Animalia
- Phylum: Arthropoda
- Clade: Pancrustacea
- Class: Insecta
- Order: Lepidoptera
- Family: Pyralidae
- Genus: Aglossa
- Species: A. steralis

Binomial name
- Aglossa steralis C. Felder, R. Felder & Rogenhofer, 1875

Species of moth

Aglossa steralis is a species of snout moth in the genus Aglossa. It was described by Cajetan Felder, Rudolf Felder and Alois Friedrich Rogenhofer in 1875 and is known from South Africa (it was described from Grahamtown).
