= Aglossa suppunctalis =

Scientific classification
- Kingdom: Animalia
- Phylum: Arthropoda
- Clade: Pancrustacea
- Class: Insecta
- Order: Lepidoptera
- Family: Pyralidae
- Genus: Aglossa
- Species: A. suppunctalis

Binomial name
- Aglossa suppunctalis de Joannis, 1927

Species of moth

Aglossa suppunctalis is a species of snout moth in the genus Aglossa. It was described by Joseph de Joannis in 1927 and is known from Mozambique.
