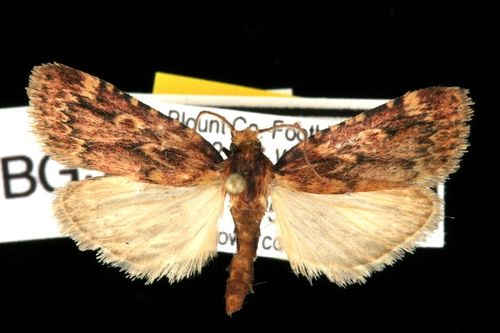

Scientific classification
- Kingdom: Animalia
- Phylum: Arthropoda
- Clade: Pancrustacea
- Class: Insecta
- Order: Lepidoptera
- Family: Pyralidae
- Genus: Aglossa
- Species: A. oculalis

Binomial name
- Aglossa oculalis Hampson, 1906

= Aglossa oculalis =

Species of moth

Aglossa oculalis is a species of snout moth in the genus Aglossa. It was described by George Hampson in 1906 and is known from the United States, including Texas.
