= Aglossa rhodalis =

Scientific classification
- Kingdom: Animalia
- Phylum: Arthropoda
- Clade: Pancrustacea
- Class: Insecta
- Order: Lepidoptera
- Family: Pyralidae
- Genus: Aglossa
- Species: A. rhodalis

Binomial name
- Aglossa rhodalis Hampson, 1906

Synonyms
- Tyndis rubrovittata Grünberg, 1910

Species of moth

Aglossa rhodalis is a species of snout moth in the genus Aglossa. It was described by George Hampson in 1906 and is known from South Africa, Algeria and Namibia.
