= Aglossa gracilalis =

Scientific classification
- Kingdom: Animalia
- Phylum: Arthropoda
- Clade: Pancrustacea
- Class: Insecta
- Order: Lepidoptera
- Family: Pyralidae
- Genus: Aglossa
- Species: A. gracilalis

Binomial name
- Aglossa gracilalis Rebel, 1914

Species of moth

Aglossa gracilalis is a species of snout moth in the genus Aglossa. It was described by Rebel, in 1914, and is known from Egypt (it was described from Kassasine).
