= Greece (disambiguation) =

Greece, officially the Hellenic Republic, is a country in south-east Europe.

== Periods of the history of Greece ==
- Prehistoric Greece
  - Neolithic Greece, 7000–1100 BC
    - Mycenaean Greece, c. 1600–1100 BC
- Ancient Greece, 1100–146 BC
  - Dark Ages in Greece, c. 1100–800 BC
  - Archaic Greece, c. 800–480 BC
  - Classical Greece, 5th and 4th centuries BC
  - Hellenistic Greece, 323–31 BC
  - Roman Greece, 146 BC – AD 330
- Medieval Greece (disambiguation)
  - Byzantine Greece
  - Frankokratia
- Ottoman Greece
- Modern Greece, 1822–present
  - First Hellenic Republic, an unrecognized state 1822–1832
  - Kingdom of Greece, a monarchy during the periods of 1832–1924, 1935–41 and 1944–74
  - Second Hellenic Republic, 1924–35
  - Hellenic State (1941–1944)
  - Greek military junta, 1967–1974
  - Third Hellenic Republic, 1974–present

== Other uses ==
- Greece (European Parliament constituency)
- Magna Graecia or Greater Greece, areas of southern Italy settled by Greeks since the 8th century BC
- Greece (town), New York, a town in western New York
  - Greece (CDP), New York, a suburb of Rochester located within the town
- "Greece", song by George Harrison from Gone Troppo
- "Greece" (song), a 2020 song by American recording artist DJ Khaled featuring Drake

== See also ==
- Greek (disambiguation)
- Grease (disambiguation)
- Grecia (disambiguation)
- Hellas (disambiguation)
- Category:National sports teams of Greece for teams known as "Greece"
- Names of the Greeks
- National Bank of Greece
