= Greaser =

Greaser or Greasers may refer to:

- Greaser (subculture), a subculture that developed in North America in the 1950s
  - Rocker (subculture) a bike subculture that started in the United Kingdom in the 1950s
- Greaser (derogatory), an ethnic slur against Latino, Italian, or Greek Americans
- Greaser, another name for Oiler (occupation), a worker whose main job is to oil and grease machinery
- In aviation, a smooth or soft landing with no noticeable bounce after contact with the landing surface
- The Greasers, a fictional gang from S. E. Hinton's book The Outsiders
- The Greasers, a fictional clique from the video game Bully

== See also ==
- Grease (disambiguation)
- Greasy (disambiguation)
