= Greasy Creek (Big Sugar Creek tributary) =

Stream in the U.S. state of Missouri

Greasy Creek is a stream in southwest Barry County in the Ozarks of southwest Missouri. It is a tributary of Big Sugar Creek.

The stream headwaters are at 36°35′55″N 93°58′30″W and the confluence with Big Sugar Creek is at 36°30′45″N 94°02′48″W. The stream source is just to the northwest of Washburn. The stream flows to the southwest passing under Missouri Route 90 and flowing parallel to county roads 1045, 1037 and 2290 to join Big Sugar Creek in the southwest corner of Barry County.

Greasy Creek was named for the greasy quality of its water.

== See also ==
- List of rivers of Missouri
