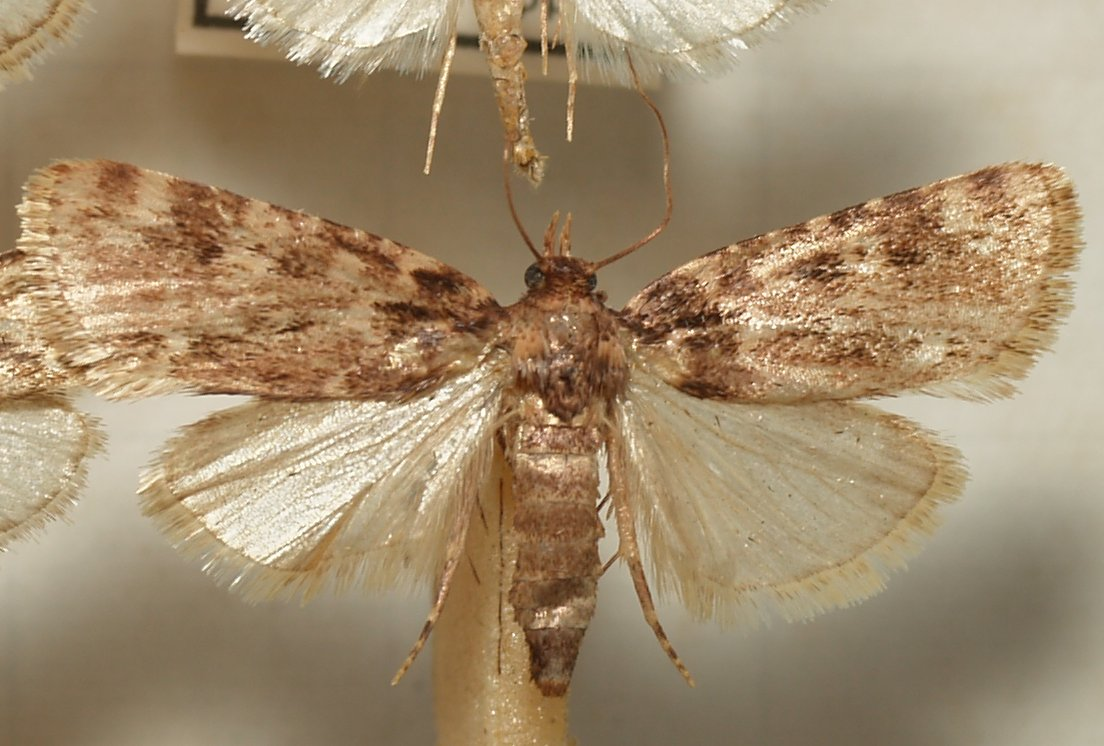
- Adult, museum specimen
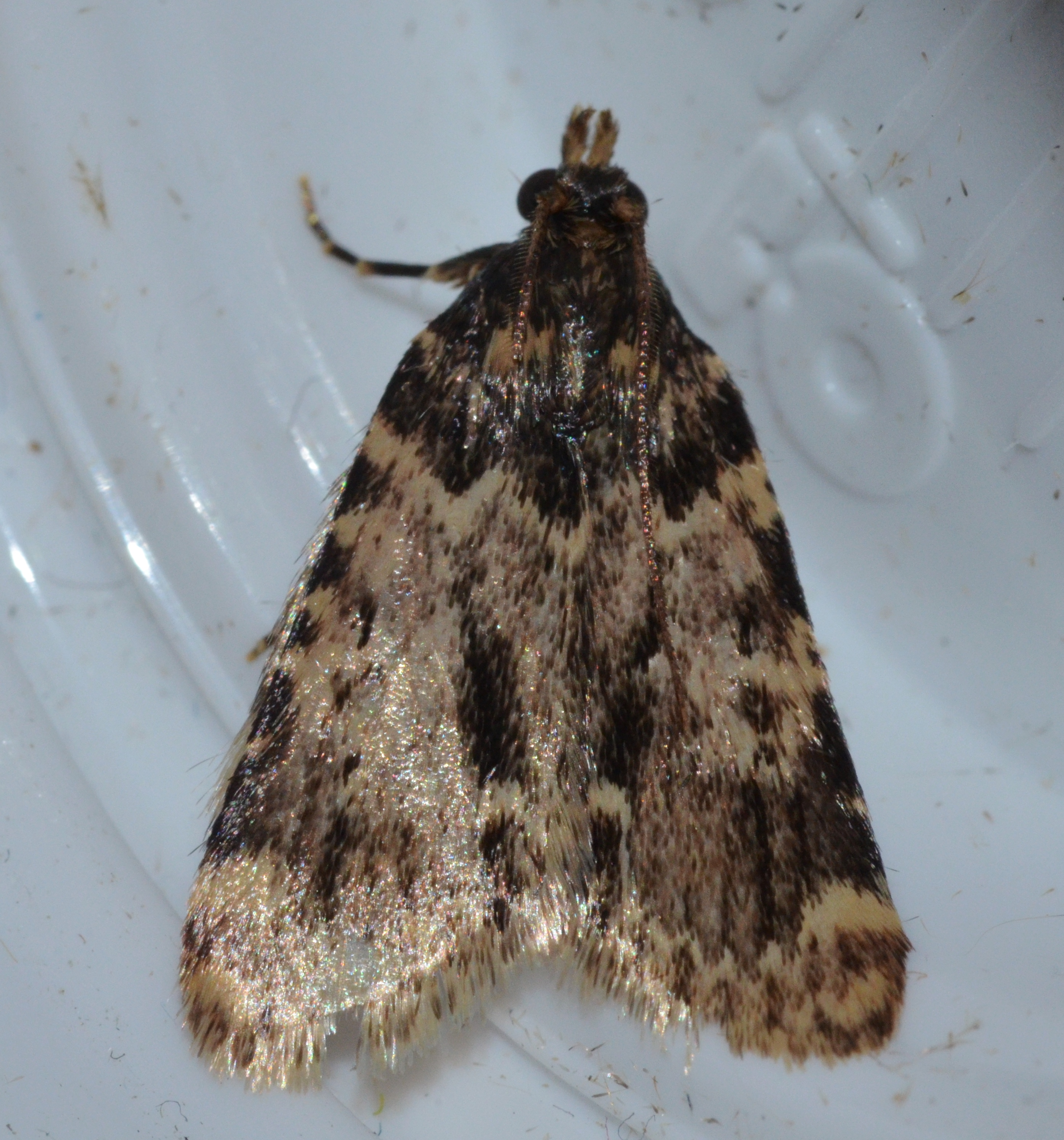
- Living

Scientific classification
- Kingdom: Animalia
- Phylum: Arthropoda
- Clade: Pancrustacea
- Class: Insecta
- Order: Lepidoptera
- Family: Pyralidae
- Genus: Aglossa
- Species: A. caprealis

Binomial name
- Aglossa caprealis (Hübner, [1809])

Synonyms
- Several, see text

= Aglossa caprealis =

Species of moth

Aglossa caprealis, the stored grain moth, is a moth species of the family Pyralidae. It is found globally, though its native range is presumably the western Palearctic or nearby regions, as in other Aglossa species.

The wingspan is 23–27 mm. The moth flies from June to August, depending on the location.

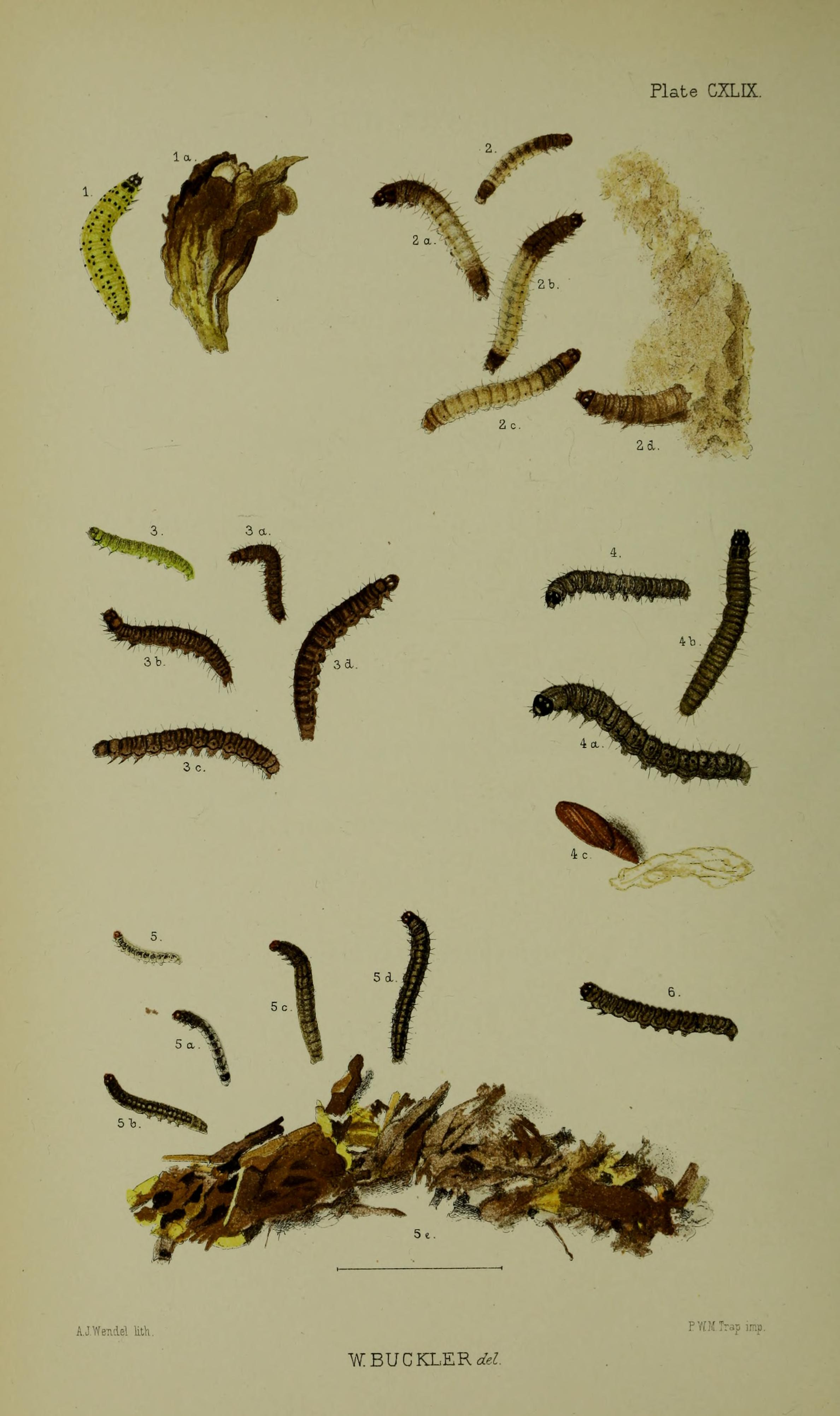
Figs.5. 5a, 5b, 5c, 5d larvae in various stages 5e case

The larvae feed on dry plant waste, grain (e.g. maize), hay, straw and decaying manure. Sometimes, they even eat animal carcasses, suet, lard, pork rinds and other fatty materials.

== Synonyms ==
Alternate but now-invalid scientific names of this species are:

- Acrobasis incultella Walker, [1866]
- Aglossa cuprealis (lapsus)
- Aglossa cuprialis (lapsus)
- Aglossa domalis Guenée, 1854
- Crambus capreolatus Haworth, 1809 (unjustified emendation)
- Pyralis aenalis Costa, 1836
- Pyralis caprealis Hübner, [1809]
- Tetralopha enthealis Hulst, 1886
