= Greasy Creek (Castor River tributary) =

Stream in the U.S. state of Missouri

Greasy Creek is a stream in Madison County in the U.S. state of Missouri. It is a tributary of the Castor River.

The stream headwaters arise at 37°28′49″N 90°15′39″W southwest of Missouri Route A. the stream floes to the southeast parallel to Route A and passes the community of Klendike. It gradually turns to the east and passes under Route A to its confluence with the Castor River just to the north of Marquand at 37°26′14″N 90°10′35″W.

Greasy Creek was named for the greasewood timber near its course, according to local history.

== See also ==
- List of rivers of Missouri
