= McKenzie Creek (Osage River tributary) =

Stream in the American state of Missouri

Coordinates: 38.056697°N 94.140223°W

McKenzie Creek is a stream in Vernon County in the U.S. state of Missouri. It is a tributary of Osage River.

Historically called "McKenzie's Branch," the creek is named after Nelson G. McKenzie, an early settler of the area.

== See also ==
- List of rivers of Missouri
