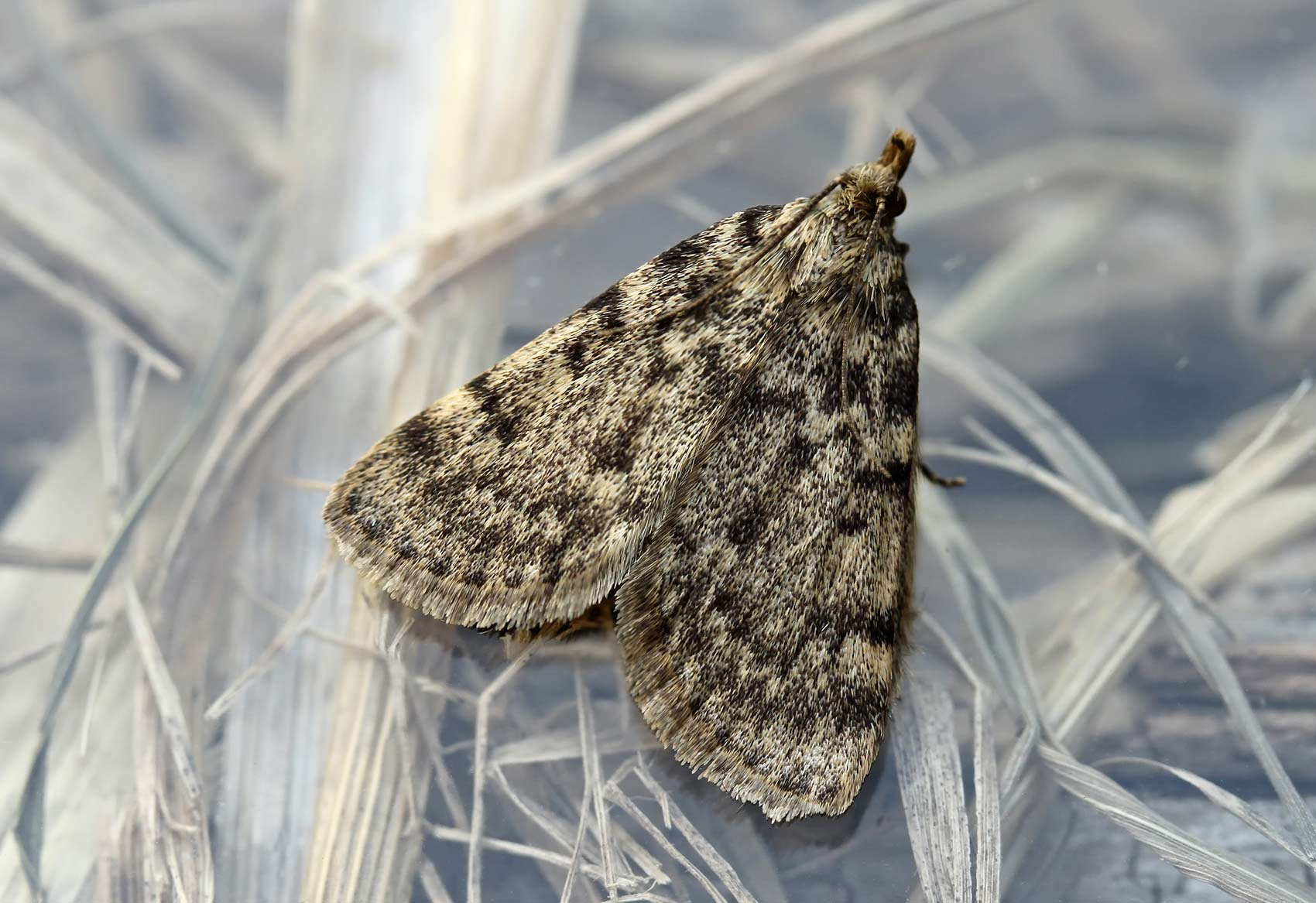

Scientific classification
- Kingdom: Animalia
- Phylum: Arthropoda
- Clade: Pancrustacea
- Class: Insecta
- Order: Lepidoptera
- Family: Pyralidae
- Genus: Aglossa
- Species: A. pinguinalis

Binomial name
- Aglossa pinguinalis (Linnaeus, 1758)

Synonyms
- Pyralis pinguinalis Linnaeus, 1758; Tinea marmorella Geoffroy, 1785; Tinea marmoratella Villers, 1789; Crambus pinguiculatus Haworth, 1809; Crambus pinguinatus Haworth, 1809; Aglossa streatfieldii Curtis, 1833; Aglossa streatfieldii Curtis, 1833; Aglossa guicciardii Constantinio, 1922

= Aglossa pinguinalis =

Species of moth

Aglossa pinguinalis, the large tabby or grease moth, is a moth in the subfamily Pyralinae. The species was first described by Carl Linnaeus in his 1758 10th edition of Systema Naturae. The dark-hued larvae feed on animal fats.

== Description ==
The wingspan is 27 mm (males) and 37 mm (females) (or a forewing length of 14 to 18 mm). The forewings are greyish-ochreous or brownish, densely sprinkled with dark fuscous; a blackish subbasal line; first and second lines obscurely paler, rather broad, waved, cloudily edged with dark fuscous on both sides, second curved outwards in dise; a dark fuscous discal spot. Hindwings fuscous-grey; a paler postmedian line very obscurely indicated. The larva is blackish or dark brown; head blackish: in silken galleries amongst chaff and hay refuse.

== Distribution ==
Native to the Palearctic. it has been introduced in North America. It has also been introduced to New Zealand.
