= McKenzie Creek (Black River tributary) =

Stream in the American state of Missouri

McKenzie Creek is a stream in Wayne County in the U.S. state of Missouri. It is a tributary of the Black River.

The stream headwaters arise in the northwest corner of Wayne County at 37°15′58″N 90°43′30″W. The stream flows generally south crossing under and flowing parallel to Missouri Route 49 and under Missouri Route 34 past Piedmont and on to its confluence with the Black River at 37°06′21″N 90°43′04″W.

McKenzie Creek has the name of a pioneer citizen.

== See also ==
- List of rivers of Missouri
