= Geode (disambiguation) =

A geode is a geological rock formation.

Geode may also refer to:

== Places ==
- La Géode, an IMAX theater in the Cité des Sciences et de l'Industrie, Paris, France
- Geode Nunataks (Geode Ridge), Finlandia Foothills, Alexander Island, Antarctica
- Geode State Park, Iowa, USA

== Groups, companies, organizations ==
- Geode (trade association), a European gas and electricity distributors
- Geode Capital Management, a U.S. investment management company
- Geophysical Exploration Of the Dynamics and Evolution of the Solar System (GEODES) at the Solar System Exploration Research Virtual Institute

== Other uses ==
- Geode (processor), a microprocessor series produced by AMD
- Apache Geode (software), see List of Apache Software Foundation projects
- Bone cyst, also called a geode

== See also ==
- Mesophleps geodes (M. geodes), a moth
- Geoid
- GEOID
