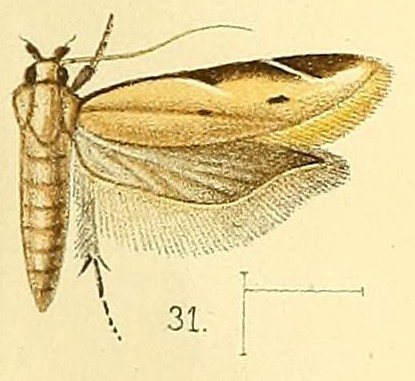
- Mesophleps palpigera

Scientific classification
- Kingdom: Animalia
- Phylum: Arthropoda
- Clade: Pancrustacea
- Class: Insecta
- Order: Lepidoptera
- Family: Gelechiidae
- Subfamily: Anacampsinae
- Genus: Mesophleps; Hübner, 1825

Synonyms
- Brachyacma Meyrick, 1886; Lathontogenus Walsingham, 1897; Paraspistes Meyrick, 1905; Chretienia Spuler, 1910; Lipatia Busck, 1910; Stiphrostola Meyrick, 1923; Crossobela Meyrick, 1923; Xerometra Meyrick, 1925; Gnosimacha Meyrick, 1927; Bucolarcha Meyrick, 1929; Uncustriodonta Agenjo, 1952; Uncostridonta Park, 1990

= Mesophleps =

Genus of moths

Mesophleps is a genus of moths in the family Gelechiidae. The genus was erected by Jacob Hübner in 1825.

== Species ==
- albilinella species group
  - Mesophleps albilinella
  - Mesophleps aspina
  - Mesophleps coffeae
  - Mesophleps nairobiensis
  - Mesophleps parvella
- geodes species group
  - Mesophleps catericta
  - Mesophleps geodes
- gigantella species group
  - Mesophleps gigantella
- palpigera species group
  - Mesophleps acutunca
  - Mesophleps adustipennis
  - Mesophleps bifidella
  - Mesophleps corsicella
  - Mesophleps crocina
  - Mesophleps epiochra
  - Mesophleps ioloncha
  - Mesophleps oxycedrella
  - Mesophleps palpigera
  - Mesophleps safranella
  - Mesophleps silacella
  - Mesophleps sublutiana
  - Mesophleps tabellata
- tephrastis species group
  - Mesophleps apentheta
  - Mesophleps argonota
  - Mesophleps chloranthes
  - Mesophleps cycnobathra
  - Mesophleps macrosemus
  - Mesophleps meliphanes
  - Mesophleps mylicotis
  - Mesophleps ochroloma
  - Mesophleps tephrastis
  - Mesophleps tetrachroa
  - Mesophleps trichombra
- trinotella species group
  - Mesophleps ochracella
  - Mesophleps trinotella
  - Mesophleps unguella
- truncatella species group
  - Mesophleps truncatella
  - Mesophleps undulatella

== Associated species ==
The following species were described in Mesophleps or at one time associated with it or one of its generic synonyms:

- Agonochaetia impunctella (Caradja, 1920)
- Anarsia centrospila Turner, 1919
- Aponoea obtusipalpis Walsingham, 1905
- Dichomeris aprica (Meyrick, 1913)
- Dichomeris sciritis (Meyrick, 1918)
- Megacraspedus arnaldi (Turati & Krüger, 1930)
- Nothris mesophracta Turner, 1919
- Pycnobathra acromelas (Turner, 1919)
- Sarotorna mesoleuca (Lower, 1900)
