= Mesophleps safranella =

Scientific classification
- Domain: Eukaryota
- Kingdom: Animalia
- Phylum: Arthropoda
- Class: Insecta
- Order: Lepidoptera
- Family: Gelechiidae
- Genus: Mesophleps
- Species: M. safranella

Binomial name
- Mesophleps safranella (Legrand, 1965)

Synonyms
- Gelechia safranella Legrand, 1965

Species of moth

Mesophleps safranella is a moth of the family Gelechiidae. It is found in Niger, Benin, Kenya, Malawi, Madagascar, Réunion and on the Seychelles.

The wingspan is 11.5–14 mm.

The larvae feed on Acacia species and Albizia lebbeck. They live in the pods.
