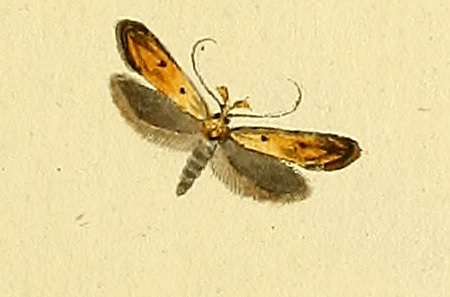

Scientific classification
- Domain: Eukaryota
- Kingdom: Animalia
- Phylum: Arthropoda
- Class: Insecta
- Order: Lepidoptera
- Family: Gelechiidae
- Genus: Mesophleps
- Species: M. silacella

Binomial name
- Mesophleps silacella (Hübner, 1796)

Synonyms
- Tinea silacella Hübner, 1796; Tinea pyropella Hübner, 1793 (preocc. [Denis & Schiffermüller], 1775); Recurvaria silacea Haworth, 1828; Mesophleps pudicellus var. apicellus Caradja, 1920; Mesophleps silacellus calaritanus Amsel, 1939; Tinea luteella Hübner, 1796

= Mesophleps silacella =

Species of moth

Mesophleps silacella, the straw crest, is a moth of the family Gelechiidae. It is found in Europe, Turkey and Algeria.

The wingspan is 9–17 mm. Adults have been recorded on the wing in June.

The larvae feed on Helianthemum species (including Helianthemum nummularium and Helianthemum tuberosum) and Fumana procumbens. They have been recorded in April, May, June and August.
