= Mesophleps palpigera =

Scientific classification
- Domain: Eukaryota
- Kingdom: Animalia
- Phylum: Arthropoda
- Class: Insecta
- Order: Lepidoptera
- Family: Gelechiidae
- Genus: Mesophleps
- Species: M. palpigera

Binomial name
- Mesophleps palpigera (Walsingham, 1891)

Synonyms
- Gelechia palpigera Walsingham, 1891; Paraspistes palpigera; Brachyacma palpigera

Species of insect

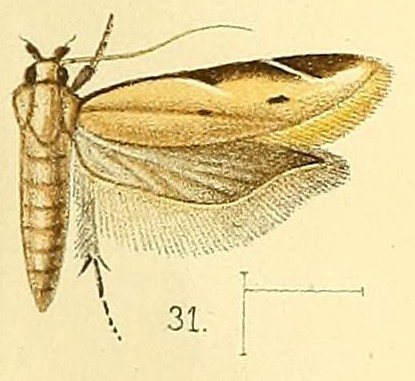
Mesophleps palpigera

Mesophleps palpigera is a moth of the family Gelechiidae. It is found in Ivory Coast, Niger, Nigeria, Zaire, Uganda, Kenya, Malawi, Mozambique, Madagascar and South Africa. Records from outside of Africa are based on misidentifications.

The wingspan is 9–15.5 mm.

The larvae feed on Bauhinia, Parkinsonia aculeata, Acacia, Albizia altissimum, Albizia lebbeck, Cajanus cajan, Crotalaria retusa, Lonchocarpus cyanescens, Millettia zechiana, Pericopsis laxiflora, Tephrosia bracteolata.
