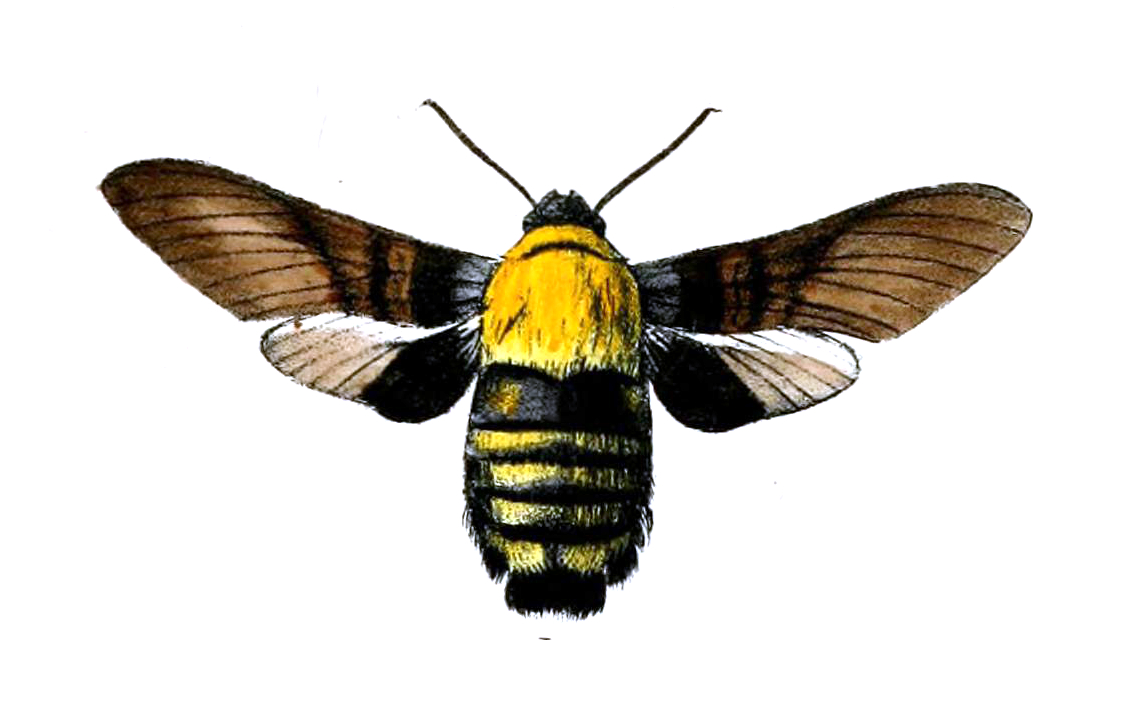

Scientific classification
- Kingdom: Animalia
- Phylum: Arthropoda
- Class: Insecta
- Order: Lepidoptera
- Family: Sphingidae
- Genus: Sataspes
- Species: S. xylocoparis

Binomial name
- Sataspes xylocoparis Butler, 1875

= Sataspes xylocoparis =

Species of moth

Sataspes xylocoparis, the eastern carpenter-bee hawkmoth, is a species of moth of the family Sphingidae. It is known from north-eastern India, Bhutan, northern Myanmar, northern Thailand, northern Vietnam and southern and eastern China. The habitat consists of shady, dense, mature hillside woodland with fast-flowing streams.

The wingspan is 52–58 mm for males and 58–70 mm for females. It is a mimic of Xylocopa carpenter bees.

It is a day-flying species. Adults feed on the nectar of various flowers.

The larvae have been recorded feeding on Dalbergia benthami in Hong Kong. Other recorded food plants include Lespedeza and Albizia lebbeck.
