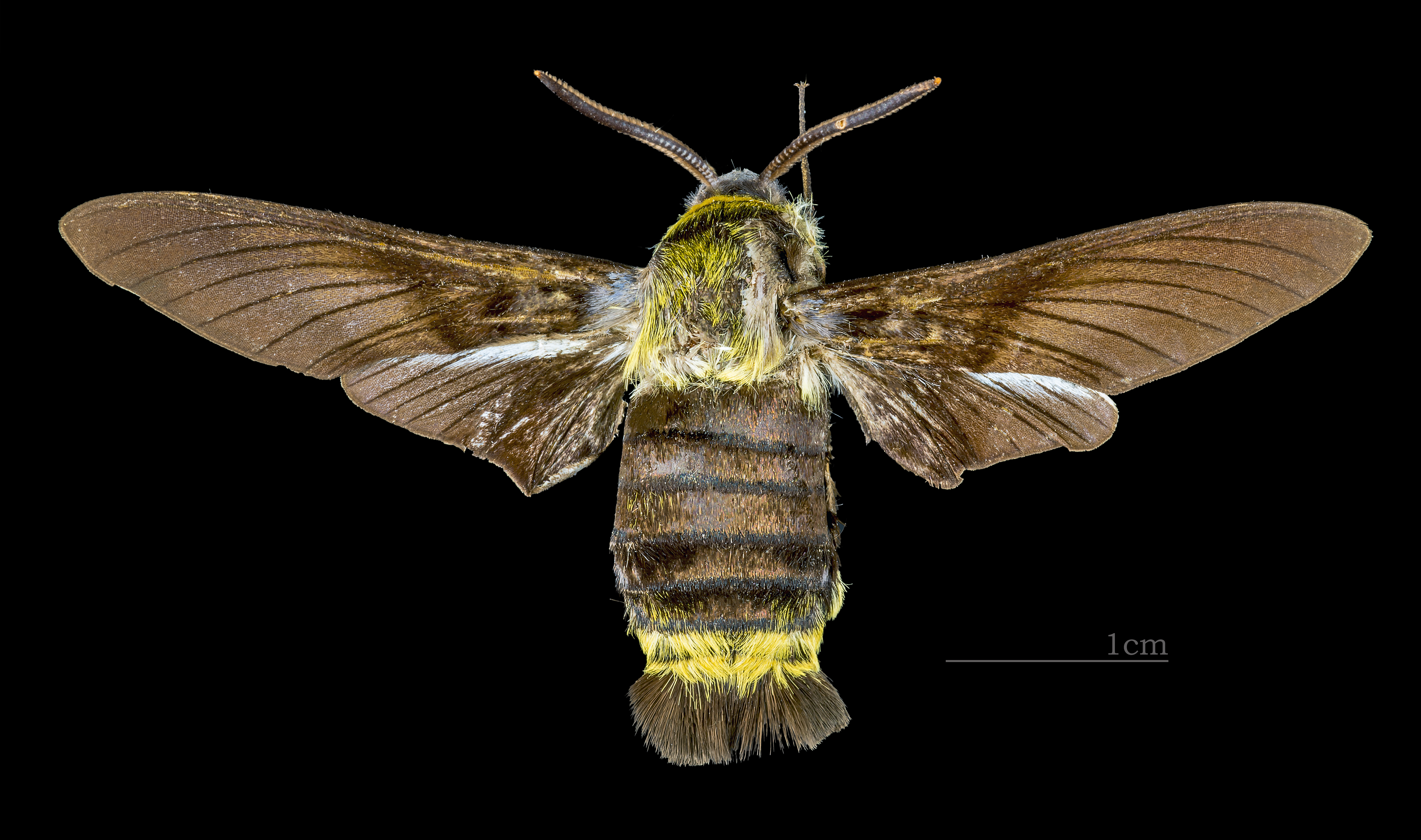
- Sataspes infernalis Dorsal male
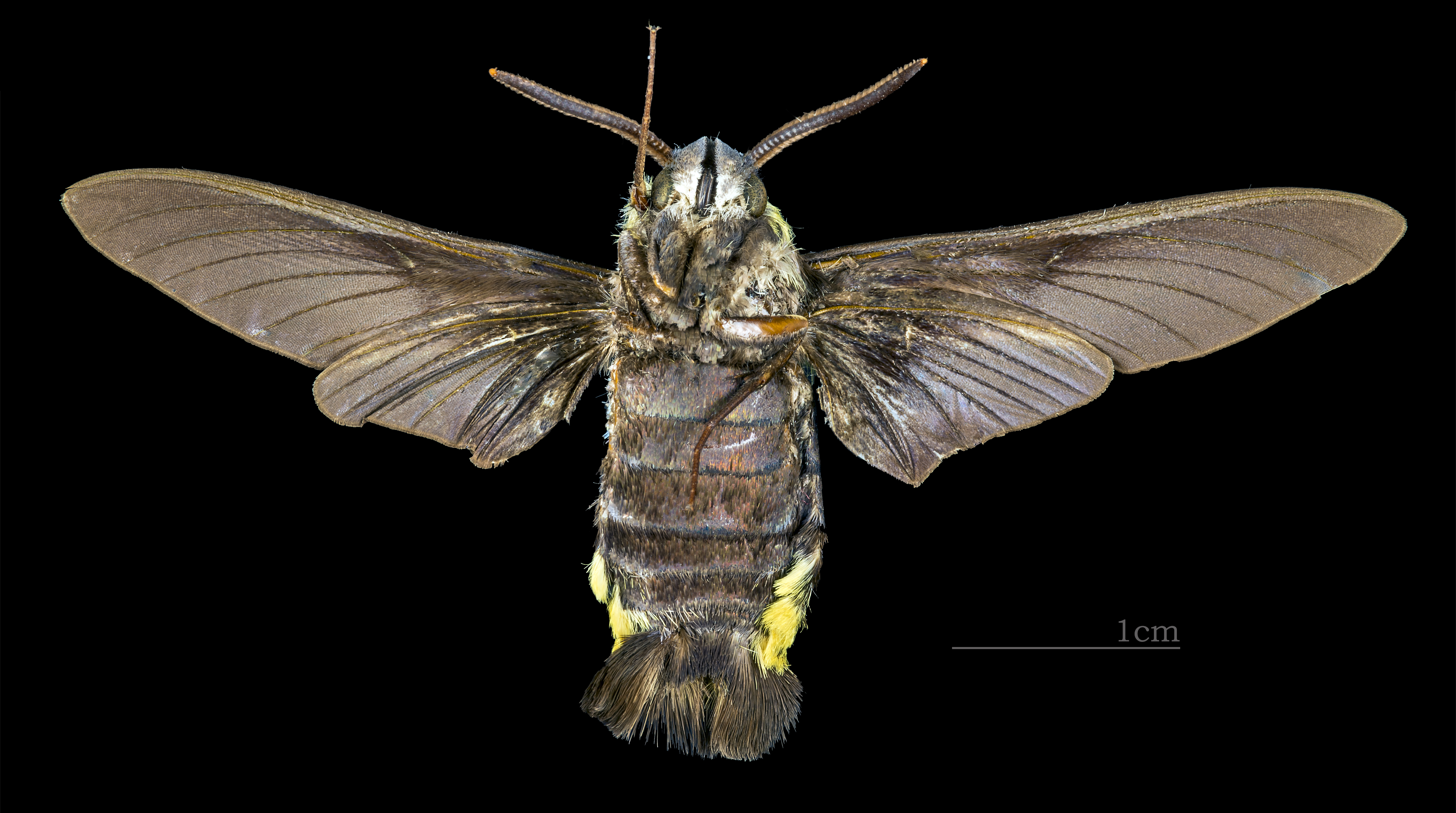
- Sataspes infernalis Ventral male

Scientific classification
- Domain: Eukaryota
- Kingdom: Animalia
- Phylum: Arthropoda
- Class: Insecta
- Order: Lepidoptera
- Family: Sphingidae
- Genus: Sataspes
- Species: S. infernalis

Binomial name
- Sataspes infernalis (Westwood, 1847)

Synonyms
- Sesia infernalis Westwood, 1847; Sataspes uniformis Butler, 1875

= Sataspes infernalis =

Species of moth

Sataspes infernalis is a species of moth of the family Sphingidae. It is known from south-western and north-eastern India, Bangladesh, northern Myanmar and northern Thailand.

The thorax upperside is yellow, except for a black, ill-defined, transverse band. Sometimes, the centre of the thorax is more or less black.
