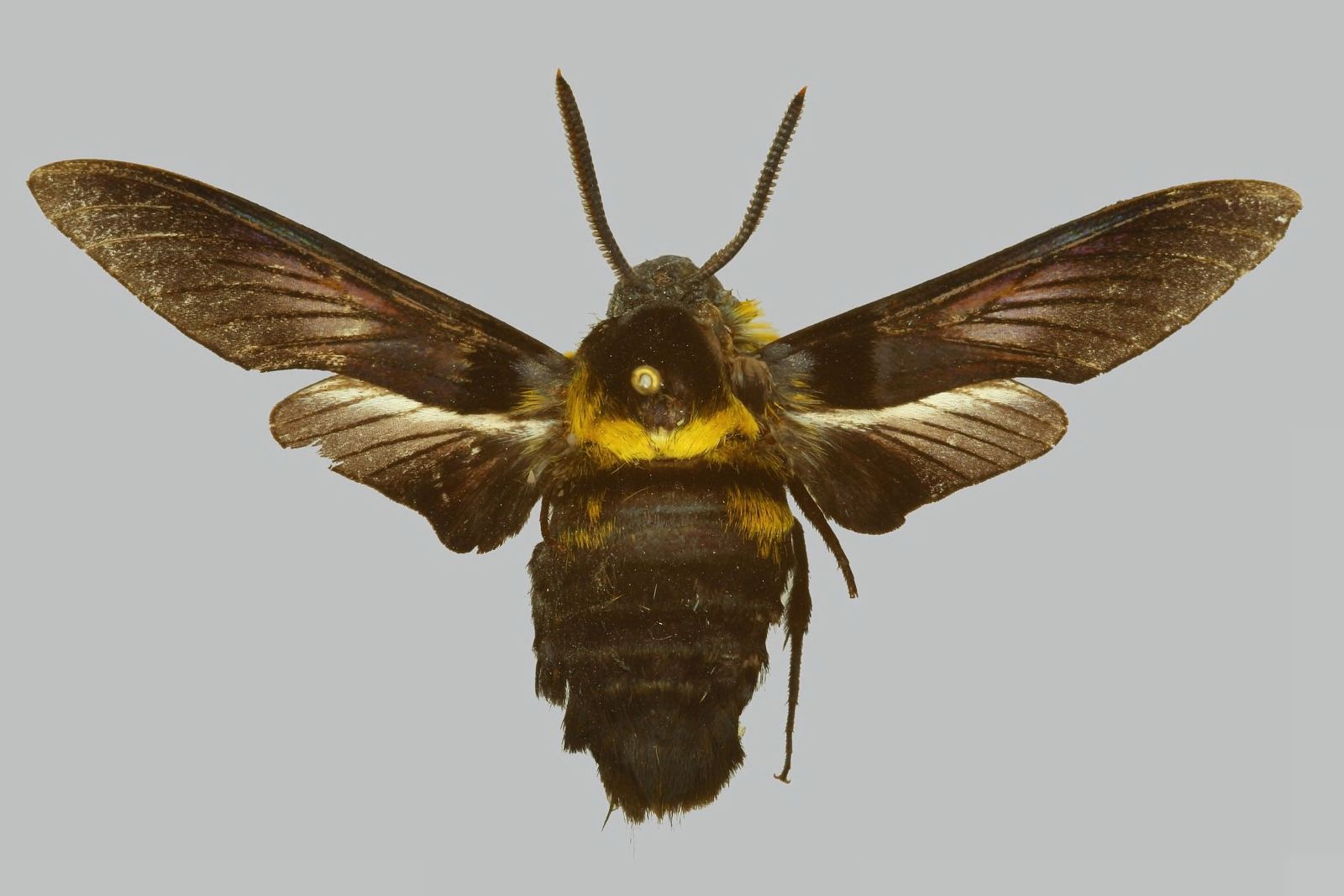

Scientific classification
- Domain: Eukaryota
- Kingdom: Animalia
- Phylum: Arthropoda
- Class: Insecta
- Order: Lepidoptera
- Family: Sphingidae
- Genus: Sataspes
- Species: S. cerberus

Binomial name
- Sataspes cerberus Semper, 1896

= Sataspes cerberus =

Species of moth

Sataspes cerberus is a species of moth of the family Sphingidae. It was described by Georg Semper in 1896 and it is known from the Philippines.

The posterior sternites of the abdomen underside of the males are primrose-yellow and the basal costal tuft of the forewing and hindwing underside is yellow. The thorax and abdomen uppersides of the females have no yellow scaling and the discs on the forewing and hindwing underside are blue.
