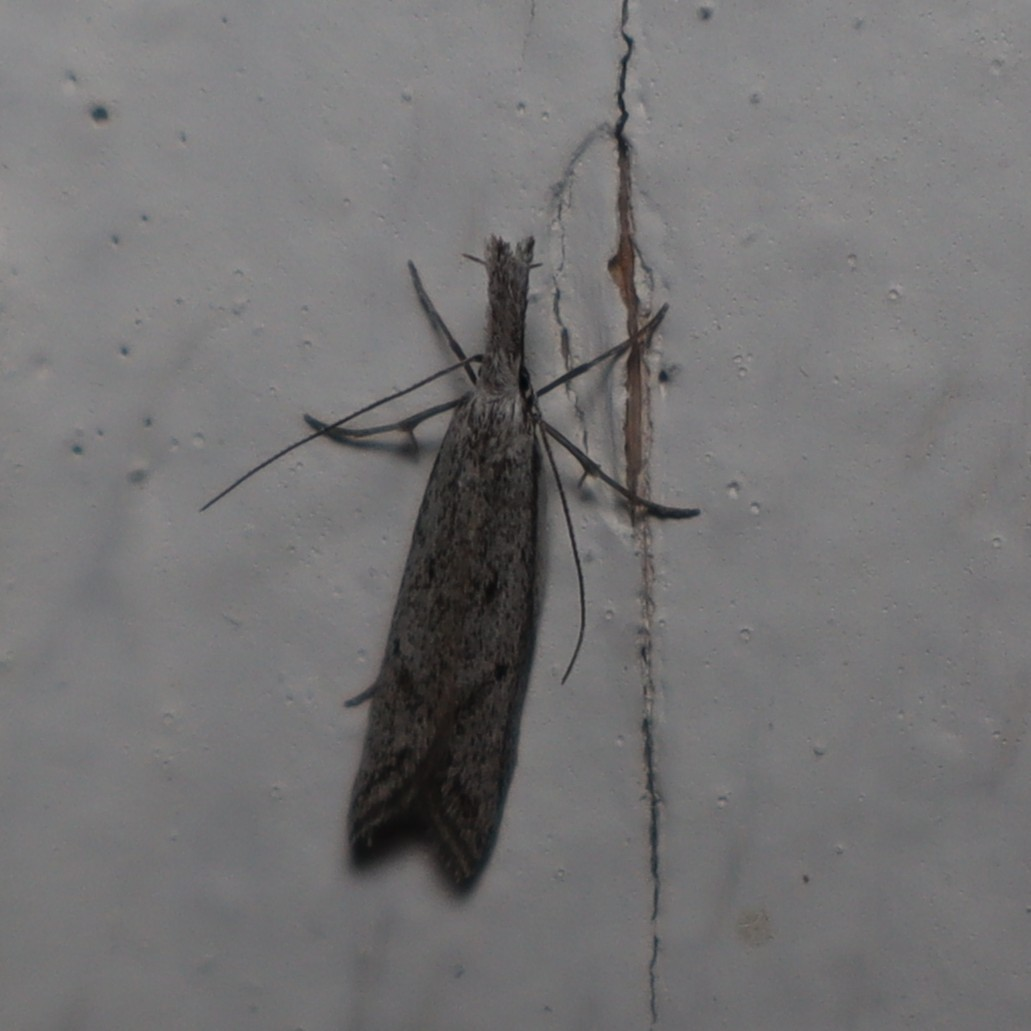

Scientific classification
- Kingdom: Animalia
- Phylum: Arthropoda
- Class: Insecta
- Order: Lepidoptera
- Family: Oecophoridae
- Genus: Pleurota
- Species: P. albastrigulella

Binomial name
- Pleurota albastrigulella Kearfott, 1907

= Pleurota albastrigulella =

Moth species

Pleurota albastrigulella is a moth of the family Oecophoridae. It is found in most of California, but has also been recorded in Baja California, Arizona, and on Vancouver Island.

The University of California at Berkeley reared one specimen from Adenostoma fasciculatum.
