= Mesophleps nairobiensis =

Scientific classification
- Domain: Eukaryota
- Kingdom: Animalia
- Phylum: Arthropoda
- Class: Insecta
- Order: Lepidoptera
- Family: Gelechiidae
- Genus: Mesophleps
- Species: M. nairobiensis

Binomial name
- Mesophleps nairobiensis Li & Zheng, 1995

Species of moth

Mesophleps nairobiensis is a moth of the family Gelechiidae. It is found in Ivory Coast, Sierra Leone, Mozambique, Uganda and Kenya.

The wingspan is 8.5–17 mm.
