= Mesophleps parvella =

Scientific classification
- Kingdom: Animalia
- Phylum: Arthropoda
- Class: Insecta
- Order: Lepidoptera
- Family: Gelechiidae
- Genus: Mesophleps
- Species: M. parvella

Binomial name
- Mesophleps parvella H.H. Li & Sattler, 2012

Species of moth

Mesophleps parvella is a moth of the family Gelechiidae. It is found in Malaysia (Brunei), Papua New Guinea and Australia (Queensland).

The wingspan is 9–13 mm (0.35–0.51 in).
