= Agonochaetia intermedia =

Scientific classification
- Kingdom: Animalia
- Phylum: Arthropoda
- Class: Insecta
- Order: Lepidoptera
- Family: Gelechiidae
- Genus: Agonochaetia
- Species: A. intermedia

Binomial name
- Agonochaetia intermedia Sattler, 1968

Species of moth

Agonochaetia intermedia is a moth of the family Gelechiidae. It is found in Austria, Switzerland, Hungary and Russia (the Volga-Don region and the southern Ural).
