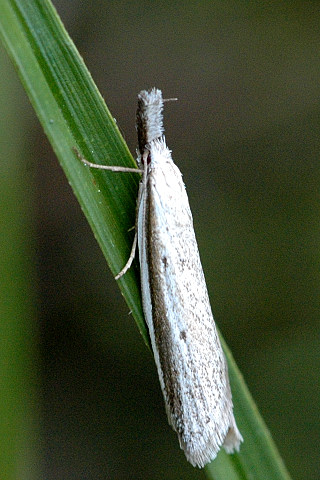

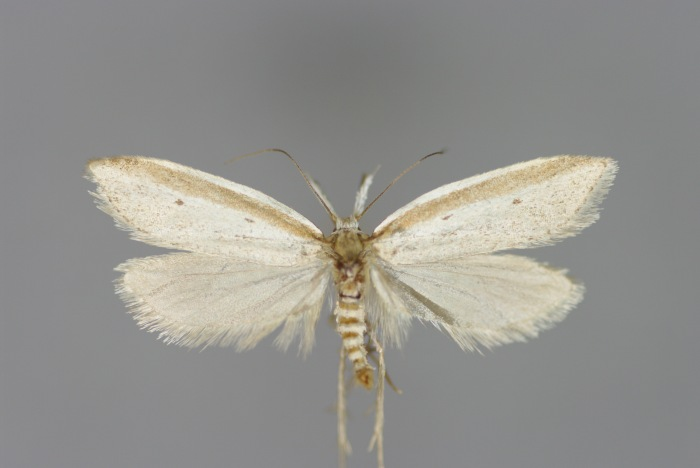

Scientific classification
- Domain: Eukaryota
- Kingdom: Animalia
- Phylum: Arthropoda
- Class: Insecta
- Order: Lepidoptera
- Family: Oecophoridae
- Genus: Pleurota
- Species: P. bicostella

Binomial name
- Pleurota bicostella Clerck, 1759

= Pleurota bicostella =

Species of moth

Pleurota bicostella is a moth of the family Oecophoridae. It is found in the Palearctic realm.

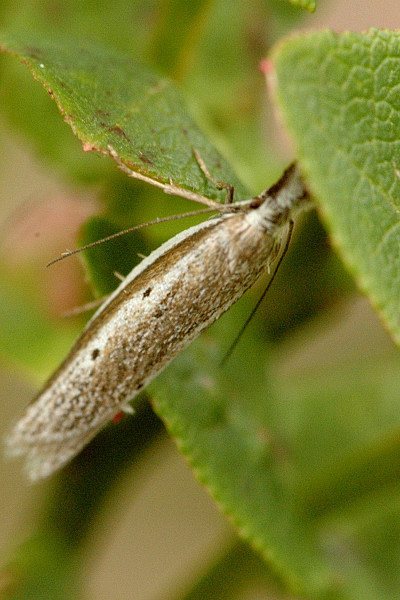

The wingspan is about 24 mm. The forewings are fuscous, irrorated with whitish; a white costal streak from base to near apex, edged beneath by a brown streak; stigmata black. Hindwings are grey. The larva is pinkish-grey, marbled with brown on sides; dorsal and subdorsal lines brownish; dots blackish; head and plate of 2 yellowish -brown, latter darker-marked.

The moth flies from June to July depending on the location.

The larvae feed on Erica species.
