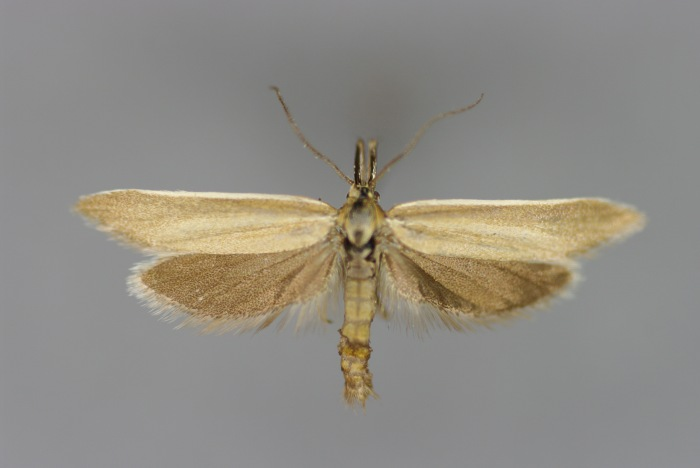

Scientific classification
- Domain: Eukaryota
- Kingdom: Animalia
- Phylum: Arthropoda
- Class: Insecta
- Order: Lepidoptera
- Family: Oecophoridae
- Genus: Pleurota
- Species: P. marginella

Binomial name
- Pleurota marginella (Denis & Schiffermüller, 1775)

Synonyms
- Tinea marginella Denis & Schiffermüller, 1775; Tinea marginella Hübner, [1810]; Tinea rostrella Hübner, 1793; Pleurota rostrella marocana Turati, 1919

= Pleurota marginella =

Species of moth

Pleurota marginella is a moth of the family Oecophoridae. It is found in Germany, Austria, Switzerland, the Czech Republic, Slovakia, Italy, Croatia, Hungary, Romania and Greece, as well as in North Africa.
