= Agonochaetia quartana =

Scientific classification
- Kingdom: Animalia
- Phylum: Arthropoda
- Clade: Pancrustacea
- Class: Insecta
- Order: Lepidoptera
- Family: Gelechiidae
- Genus: Agonochaetia
- Species: A. quartana

Binomial name
- Agonochaetia quartana Povolný, 1990

Species of moth

Agonochaetia quartana is a moth of the family Gelechiidae. It is found in Bulgaria.
