= Mesophleps meliphanes =

Scientific classification
- Domain: Eukaryota
- Kingdom: Animalia
- Phylum: Arthropoda
- Class: Insecta
- Order: Lepidoptera
- Family: Gelechiidae
- Genus: Mesophleps
- Species: M. meliphanes

Binomial name
- Mesophleps meliphanes (Lower, 1894)

Synonyms
- Cleodora meliphanes Lower, 1894; Xerometra meliphanes

Species of moth

Mesophleps meliphanes is a moth of the family Gelechiidae. It is found in Southern Australia.
