= Mesophleps unguella =

Scientific classification
- Kingdom: Animalia
- Phylum: Arthropoda
- Class: Insecta
- Order: Lepidoptera
- Family: Gelechiidae
- Genus: Mesophleps
- Species: M. unguella

Binomial name
- Mesophleps unguella H.H. Li & Sattler, 2012

Species of moth

Mesophleps unguella is a moth of the family Gelechiidae. It was described by H.H. Li and Sattler in 2012 and is endemic to Kenya.

The wingspan is 11.5–15 millimetres (0.45–0.59 in). The forewings are pale ochre with several black spots along the termen.

== Etymology ==
The species name is derived from Latin ungus (meaning nail) and the postfix -ellus and refers to the distally widened uncus in the male genitalia.
