= Mesophleps macrosemus =

Scientific classification
- Domain: Eukaryota
- Kingdom: Animalia
- Phylum: Arthropoda
- Class: Insecta
- Order: Lepidoptera
- Family: Gelechiidae
- Genus: Mesophleps
- Species: M. macrosemus

Binomial name
- Mesophleps macrosemus (Lower, 1900)

Synonyms
- Ypsolophus macrosemus Lower, 1900; Xerometra macrosema

Species of moth

Mesophleps macrosemus is a moth of the family Gelechiidae. It is found in Australia (New South Wales).
