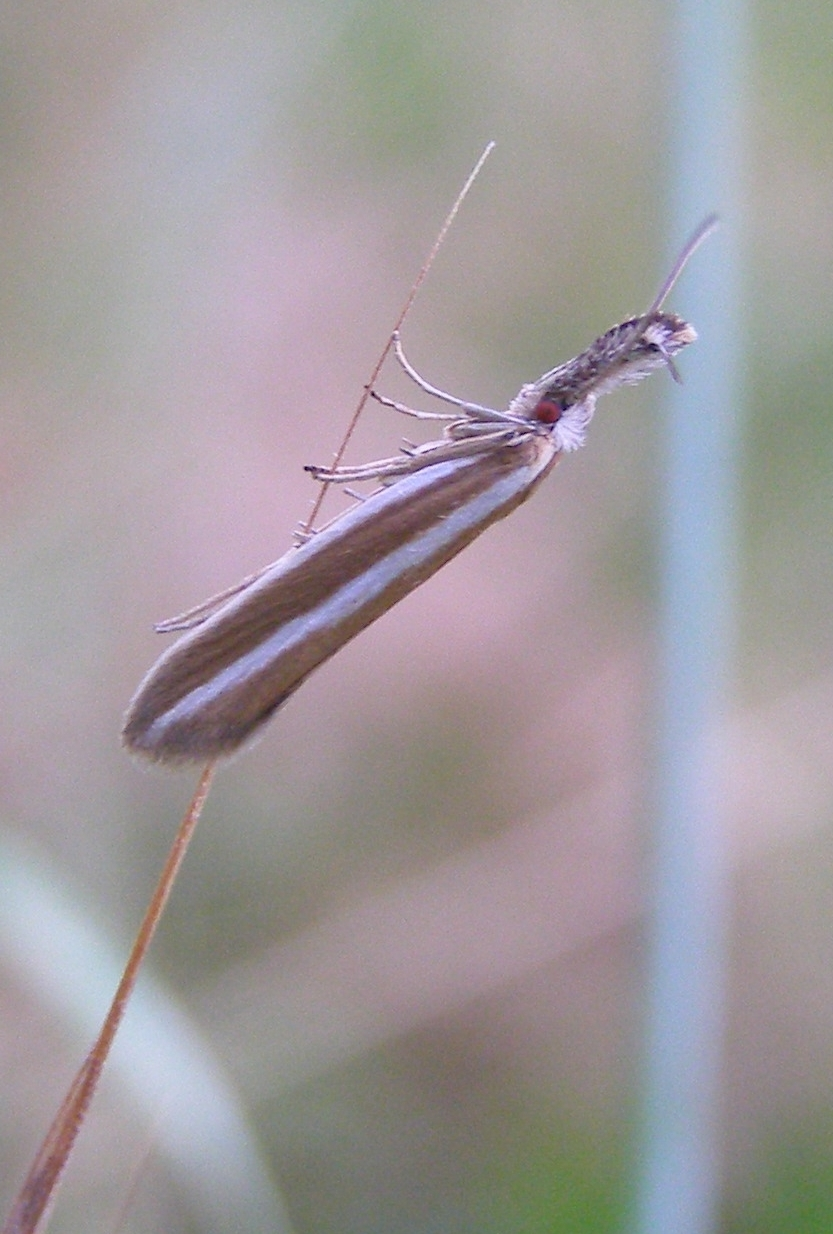

Scientific classification
- Domain: Eukaryota
- Kingdom: Animalia
- Phylum: Arthropoda
- Class: Insecta
- Order: Lepidoptera
- Family: Oecophoridae
- Genus: Pleurota
- Species: P. aristella

Binomial name
- Pleurota aristella (Linnaeus, 1767)

Synonyms
- Phalaena aristella Linnaeus, 1767; Pleurota bistriella Constant, 1885; Pleurota breviella Constant, 1885; Anchinia cyrniella Mann, 1855; Pleurota cyrniella (Mann, 1855)

= Pleurota aristella =

Species of moth

Pleurota aristella is a moth of the family Oecophoridae. It is found in most of southern and central Europe, as well as the Channel Islands. In the east, the range extends to the eastern part of the Palearctic realm. It is also present in the Near East.

The wingspan is 20–22 mm.

The larvae feed on various low-growing plants.

== Subspecies ==
- Pleurota aristella aristella (Linnaeus, 1767)
- Pleurota aristella bitrabicella (Germar, 1817)
- Pleurota aristella schlaegeriella (Zeller, 1848)
