= Mesophleps truncatella =

Scientific classification
- Kingdom: Animalia
- Phylum: Arthropoda
- Class: Insecta
- Order: Lepidoptera
- Family: Gelechiidae
- Genus: Mesophleps
- Species: M. truncatella

Binomial name
- Mesophleps truncatella H.H. Li & Sattler, 2012

Species of moth

Mesophleps truncatella is a moth of the family Gelechiidae. It is found in Australia (Northern Territory, Queensland) and Vanuatu.

The wingspan is 8–14 mm.
