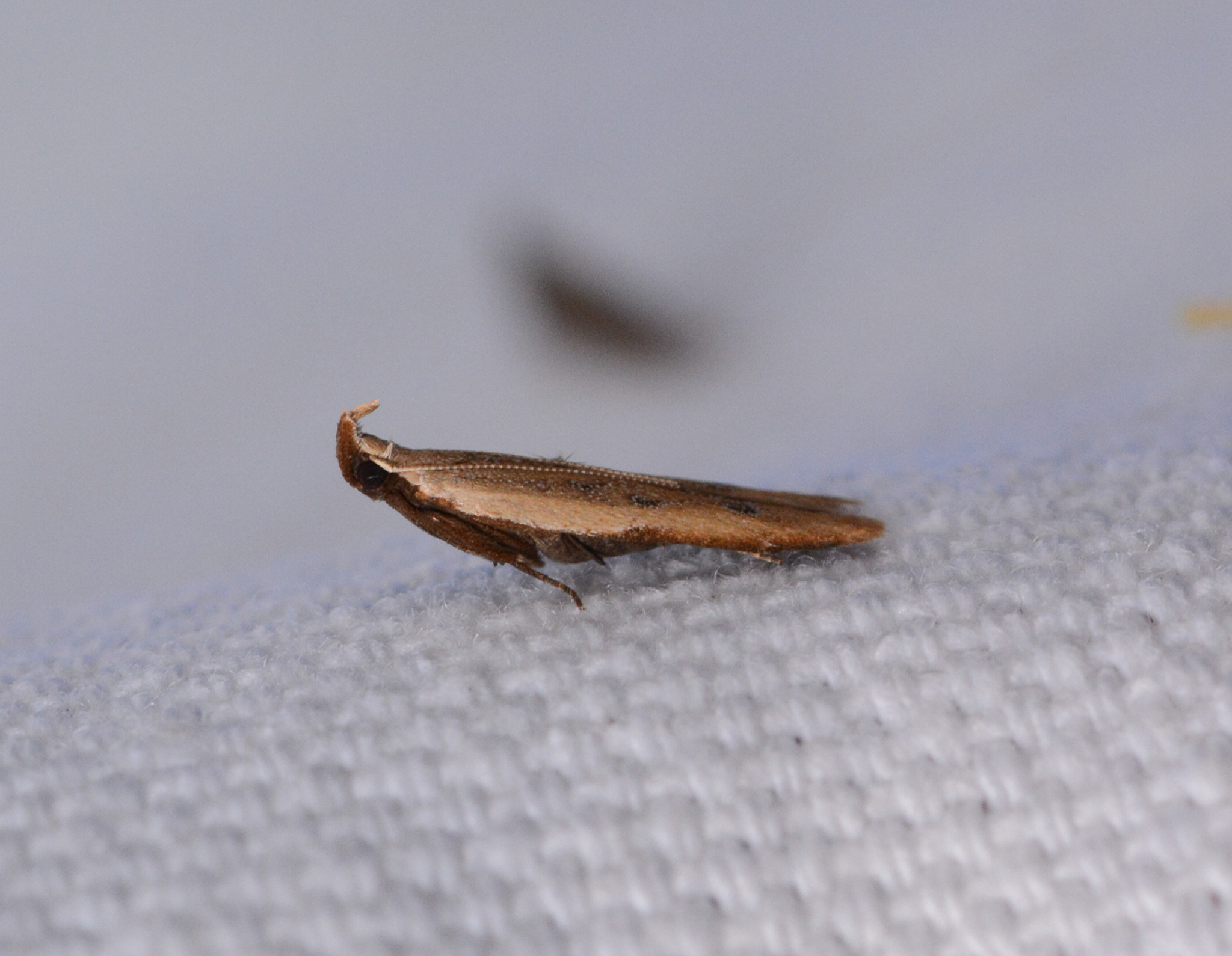

Scientific classification
- Domain: Eukaryota
- Kingdom: Animalia
- Phylum: Arthropoda
- Class: Insecta
- Order: Lepidoptera
- Family: Gelechiidae
- Genus: Mesophleps
- Species: M. adustipennis

Binomial name
- Mesophleps adustipennis (Walsingham, 1897)

Synonyms
- Lathontogenus adustipennis Walsingham, 1897; Lipatia crotalariella Busck, 1910

= Mesophleps adustipennis =

Soybean webworm moth

Species of moth

Mesophleps adustipennis, the soybean webworm moth, is a moth of the family Gelechiidae. It is found in the western and southern parts of the United States (California, Texas, Mississippi and Florida), Mexico, Honduras, Costa Rica, Panama, Cuba, the West Indies (the Cayman Islands, Jamaica, Puerto Rico, Guana, St Thomas, St Croix, Anguilla, Dominica, Barbados, Grenada, Tobago, Trinidad), Venezuela, Ecuador (Galapagos Islands), Peru, Brazil (Rondônia, Amazonas, Maranhão, Minas Gerais, Espírito Santo, São Paulo).

The wingspan is 7.5–18 mm.

The larvae feed on Cajanus cajan, Crotalaria, Acacia farnesiana and Pithecellobium pallens.
