= Agonochaetia incredibilis =

Scientific classification
- Kingdom: Animalia
- Phylum: Arthropoda
- Clade: Pancrustacea
- Class: Insecta
- Order: Lepidoptera
- Family: Gelechiidae
- Genus: Agonochaetia
- Species: A. incredibilis

Binomial name
- Agonochaetia incredibilis Povolný, 1965

Species of moth

Agonochaetia incredibilis is a moth of the family Gelechiidae. It is found in Uzbekistan.
