= Mesophleps cycnobathra =

Scientific classification
- Domain: Eukaryota
- Kingdom: Animalia
- Phylum: Arthropoda
- Class: Insecta
- Order: Lepidoptera
- Family: Gelechiidae
- Genus: Mesophleps
- Species: M. cycnobathra

Binomial name
- Mesophleps cycnobathra (Lower, 1898)

Synonyms
- Paltodora cycnobathra Lower, 1898; Xerometra cycnobathra

Species of moth

Mesophleps cycnobathra is a moth of the family Gelechiidae. It is found in Australia (New South Wales).
