= Mesophleps mylicotis =

Scientific classification
- Kingdom: Animalia
- Phylum: Arthropoda
- Class: Insecta
- Order: Lepidoptera
- Family: Gelechiidae
- Genus: Mesophleps
- Species: M. mylicotis

Binomial name
- Mesophleps mylicotis (Meyrick, 1904)

Synonyms
- Nothris mylicotis Meyrick, 1904; Xerometra mylicotis

Species of moth

Mesophleps mylicotis is a moth of the family Gelechiidae. It is found in Australia (South Australia).
