= Mesophleps tephrastis =

Scientific classification
- Kingdom: Animalia
- Phylum: Arthropoda
- Class: Insecta
- Order: Lepidoptera
- Family: Gelechiidae
- Genus: Mesophleps
- Species: M. tephrastis

Binomial name
- Mesophleps tephrastis (Meyrick, 1904)

Synonyms
- Nothris tephrastis Meyrick, 1904; Xerometra tephrastis

Species of moth

Mesophleps tephrastis is a moth of the family Gelechiidae. It is found in Australia (Western Australia).
