= Agonochaetia =

Scientific classification
- Kingdom: Animalia
- Phylum: Arthropoda
- Clade: Pancrustacea
- Class: Insecta
- Order: Lepidoptera
- Family: Gelechiidae
- Tribe: Gnorimoschemini
- Genus: Agonochaetia; Povolný, 1965

Synonyms
- Sautereopsis Povolný, 1965

Genus of moths

Agonochaetia is a genus of moths in the family Gelechiidae.

== Species ==
- Agonochaetia conspersa (Braun, 1921)
- Agonochaetia impunctella (Caradja, 1920)
- Agonochaetia incredibilis (Povolný, 1965)
- Agonochaetia intermedia (Sattler, 1968)
- Agonochaetia quartana (Povolný, 1990)
- Agonochaetia terrestrella (Zeller, 1872)
- Agonochaetia tuvella (Bidzilya, 2000)
