= Agonochaetia conspersa =

Scientific classification
- Domain: Eukaryota
- Kingdom: Animalia
- Phylum: Arthropoda
- Class: Insecta
- Order: Lepidoptera
- Family: Gelechiidae
- Genus: Agonochaetia
- Species: A. conspersa

Binomial name
- Agonochaetia conspersa (Braun, 1921)

Synonyms
- Gelechia conspersa Braun, 1921

Species of moth

Agonochaetia conspersa is a moth of the family Gelechiidae. It is found in North America, where it has been recorded from Alberta and Montana.

The wingspan is 18–19 mm. The forewings are pale greyish brown, the bases of the scales whitish, dusted with scattered whitish scales, which occur singly except in the apical third of the wing, where they form ill-defined spots. A row of these extends around the apex from the apical third of the costa to the tornus. The costal margin is slightly darkened before the first of these spots. There is a faint darker small spot on the disc and a larger one at end of cell. The hindwings are pale brownish grey.
