= Mesophleps coffeae =

Scientific classification
- Kingdom: Animalia
- Phylum: Arthropoda
- Class: Insecta
- Order: Lepidoptera
- Family: Gelechiidae
- Genus: Mesophleps
- Species: M. coffeae

Binomial name
- Mesophleps coffeae H.H. Li & Sattler, 2012

Species of moth

Mesophleps coffeae is a moth of the family Gelechiidae. It is found in China (Hong Kong), Thailand, Malaysia, Indonesia (North Sulawesi) and Timor.

The wingspan is 8–16.5 mm.

The larvae feed on Coffea species, including Coffea liberica and possibly Coffea quillou. They live in the dry berries.

== Etymology ==
The species name is derived from the host-plant genus Coffea.
