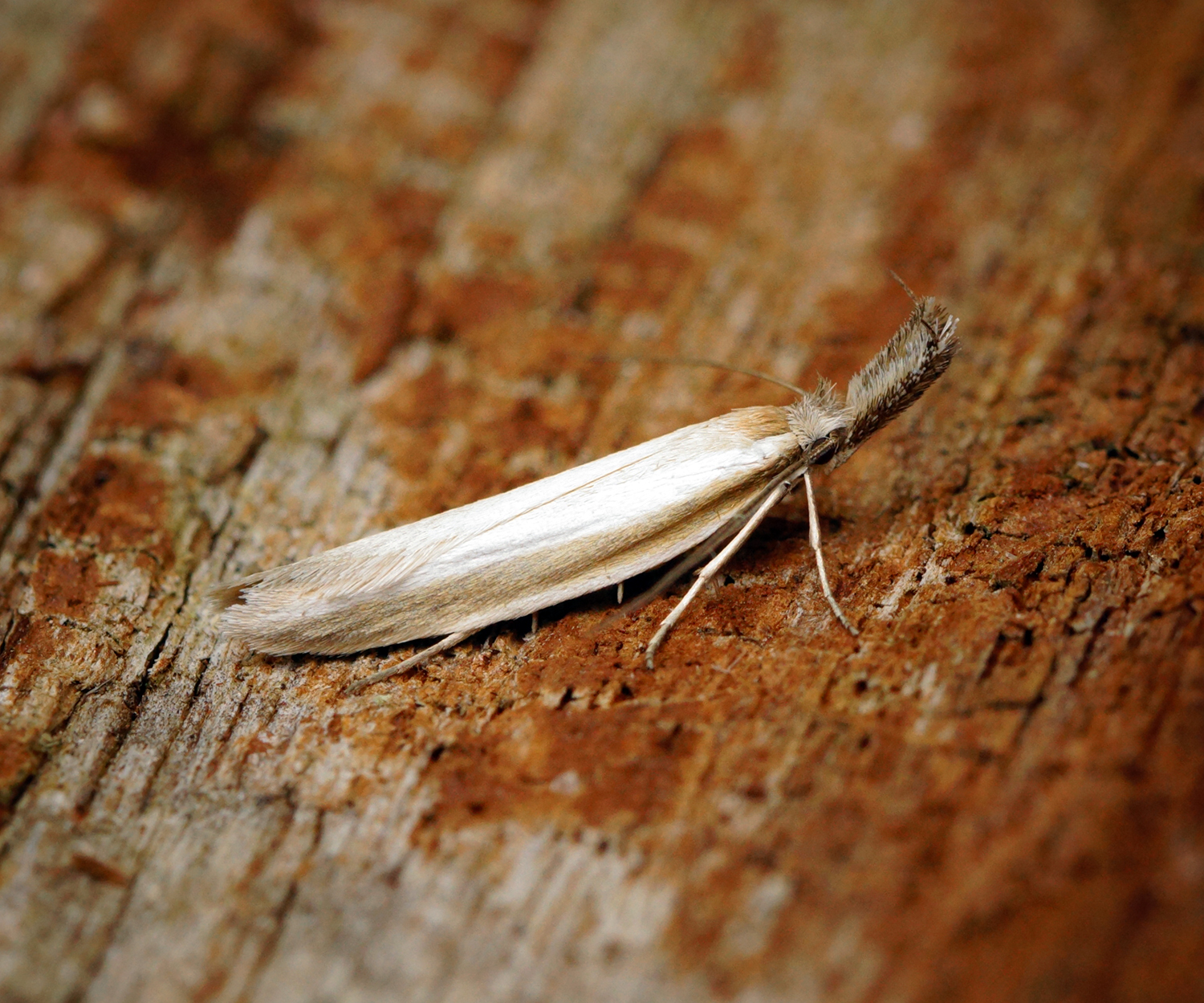
- Pleurota pyropella

Scientific classification
- Kingdom: Animalia
- Phylum: Arthropoda
- Clade: Pancrustacea
- Class: Insecta
- Order: Lepidoptera
- Family: Oecophoridae
- Genus: Pleurota; Hübner, 1825

= Pleurota =

Genus of moths

Pleurota is a genus of moths belonging to the family Oecophoridae. The species of this genus are found in Europe, southern Africa and North America.

== Species ==
The following are recognised in the genus Pleurota:

- Pleurota acratopa Turner, 1939
- Pleurota acutella Chrétien, 1922
- Pleurota agadirensis Tabell et al., 2021
- Pleurota agastopis Turner, 1939
- Pleurota albarracina Rebel, 1917
- Pleurota albastrigulella Kearfott, 1907
- Pleurota algeriella Baker, 1885
- Pleurota amaniella Mann, 1873
- Pleurota amaurodoxa Meyrick, 1935
- Pleurota aorsella Christoph, 1872
- Pleurota aprilella Tabell et al., 2021
- Pleurota aragonella Chrétien, 1925
- Pleurota arduella Rebel, 1906
- Pleurota argodonta Meyrick, 1913
- Pleurota argoptera Meyrick, 1884
- Pleurota aristella (Linnaeus, 1767)
- Pleurota armeniella Caradja, 1920
- Pleurota asiatica (Back, 1973) Back., 1973
- Pleurota atlasensis Kaila et al., 2021
- Pleurota azrouensis Tabell, Mutanen & Sihvonen, 2019
- Pleurota berytella Rebel, 1902
- Pleurota bicostella (Clerck, 1759)
- Pleurota bitrabicella
- Pleurota brevispinella (Zeller, 1847)
- Pleurota brevivitella Walker, 1864
- Pleurota callizona Meyrick, 1884
- Pleurota castagniccia Varenne & Nel, 2013
- Pleurota chalepensis Rebel, 1917
- Pleurota chlorochyta Meyrick, 1884
- Pleurota cnephaea Meyrick, 1889
- Pleurota contignatella Christoph, 1872
- Pleurota contristatella Mann, 1867
- Pleurota crassinervis Meyrick, 1884
- Pleurota creticella Rebel, 1916
- Pleurota cumaniella Rebel, 1907
- Pleurota cyrniella Mann, 1855
- Pleurota dalilae Tabell et al., 2021
- Pleurota dissimilella Amsel, 1956
- Pleurota drucella Walsingham, 1881
- Pleurota elegans Stainton, 1867
- Pleurota endesma Meyrick, 1884
- Pleurota epiclines Turner, 1939
- Pleurota epitripta Turner, 1917
- Pleurota ericella (Duponchel, 1839)
- Pleurota eximia Lederer, 1861
- Pleurota filigerella Mann, 1867
- Pleurota flavella Turati, 1922
- Pleurota flavescens Turati, 1922
- Pleurota forficella Hübner, 1816
- Pleurota gallicella Huemer & Luquet, 1995
- Pleurota generosella Rebel, 1900
- Pleurota glitzella (Staudinger, 1883)
- Pleurota goundafella Zerny, 1936
- Pleurota grisea Amsel, 1951
- Pleurota griseella Turati, 1934
- Pleurota gypsina Meyrick, 1884
- Pleurota hastiformis Walsingham, 1905
- Pleurota hebetella Ragonot, 1889
- Pleurota himantias Meyrick, 1913
- Pleurota holoxesta Meyrick, 1889
- Pleurota homaima Gozmany, 1954
- Pleurota homalota Meyrick, 1889
- Pleurota honorella (Hübner, 1813)
- Pleurota hoplophanes Meyrick, 1889
- Pleurota huebneri Koçak, 1980
- Pleurota idalia Meyrick, 1923
- Pleurota illucidella Chrétien, 1915
- Pleurota indecorella Rebel, 1917
- Pleurota insignella Zerny, 1935
- Pleurota issicella Staudinger, 1880
- Pleurota karmeliella Amsel, 1935
- Pleurota karsholti Tabell et al., 2021
- Pleurota kerbelella Amsel, 1949
- Pleurota kostjuki Lvovsky, 1990
- Pleurota kullbergi Tabell et al., 2021
- Pleurota lacteella Kaila et al., 2021
- Pleurota lacteola Turner, 1939
- Pleurota largella Lederer, 1855
- Pleurota lepigrei Lucas, 1937
- Pleurota leucogramma Turner, 1917
- Pleurota leucostephes Turner, 1939
- Pleurota lineata Toll, 1948
- Pleurota lomographa Lower, 1902
- Pleurota macroscia Meyrick, 1889
- Pleurota macrosella Rebel, 1900
- Pleurota macrosticha Turner, 1939
- Pleurota majorella Rebel, 1902
- Pleurota marginella (Denis & Schiffermüller, 1775)
- Pleurota mauretanica Baker, 1888
- Pleurota metricella (Zeller, 1847)
- Pleurota minimella Rebel, 1902
- Pleurota monochroma Tabell et al., 2021
- Pleurota monotonia Filipjev, 1925
- Pleurota montalbella Zerny, 1934
- Pleurota moroccoensis Kaila et al., 2021
- Pleurota murina Tabell et al., 2021
- Pleurota neotes Walsingham, 1911
- Pleurota neurograpta Filipjev, 1928
- Pleurota nitens Staudinger, 1870
- Pleurota nobilella Rebel, 1900
- Pleurota obtusella Rebel, 1917
- Pleurota ochreopalpella Kaila et al., 2021
- Pleurota ochreostrigella Baker, 1885
- Pleurota oranella Baker, 1888
- Pleurota paragallicella Tabell et al., 2021
- Pleurota pellicolor Kaila et al., 2021
- Pleurota peloxantha Meyrick, 1884
- Pleurota pentapolitella Turati, 1924
- Pleurota phaeolepida Tabell et al., 2021
- Pleurota phormictis Meyrick, 1913
- Pleurota photodotis Meyrick, 1889
- Pleurota picea Turner, 1939
- Pleurota placina Turner, 1939
- Pleurota planella (Staudinger, 1859)
- Pleurota platyrrhoa Meyrick, 1923
- Pleurota pleurotella (Staudinger, 1871)
- Pleurota protasella Staudinger, 1883
- Pleurota proteella Staudinger, 1880
- Pleurota protogramma Meyrick, 1884
- Pleurota proxima Turner, 1939
- Pleurota psammoxantha Meyrick, 1884
- Pleurota psephena Meyrick, 1884
- Pleurota punctella (O.Costa, 1836)
- Pleurota pungitiella Herrich-Schäffer, 1854
- Pleurota pyropella (Denis & Schiffermüller, 1775)
- Pleurota rostrella Hübner, 1793
- Pleurota scolopistis Meyrick, 1909
- Pleurota sefrainella Chrétien, 1915
- Pleurota semicanella Constant, 1884
- Pleurota semophanes Meyrick, 1889
- Pleurota simplex Staudinger, 1880
- Pleurota sobriella (Staudinger, 1859)
- Pleurota sparella Lederer, 1855
- Pleurota staintoniella Baker, 1888
- Pleurota stasiastica Meyrick, 1884
- Pleurota stenodesma Lower, 1894
- Pleurota submetricella Stainton, 1867
- Pleurota subpyropella Staudinger, 1880
- Pleurota syriaca Staudinger, 1880
- Pleurota syrtium Turati, 1924
- Pleurota taepperi Amsel, 1933
- Pleurota taepperi Amsel, 1935
- Pleurota teligerella (Staudinger, 1859)
- Pleurota tenellula Turner, 1939
- Pleurota tephrina Meyrick, 1884
- Pleurota ternaria Tabell, Mutanen & Sihvonen, 2019
- Pleurota tetrargyra Meyrick, 1928
- Pleurota themeropis Meyrick, 1884
- Pleurota thiopepla Turner, 1939
- Pleurota titanitis Turner, 1927
- Pleurota trichomella Turati, 1926
- Pleurota tricolor Kaila et al., 2021
- Pleurota tristatella Staudinger, 1870
- Pleurota tristictella Seebold, 1898
- Pleurota tritosticta Turner, 1927
- Pleurota tyrochroa Turner, 1939
- Pleurota uygar Kemal & Koçak, 2017
- Pleurota variocolor Tabell, Mutanen & Sihvonen, 2019
- Pleurota vittalba Staudinger, 1871
- Pleurota wiltshirei Amsel, 1949
- Pleurota xiphochrysa Lower, 1905
- Pleurota zalocoma Meyrick, 1884
- BOLD:ACJ0629 Pleurota sp.
- BOLD:ACP2554 Pleurota sp.
- BOLD:ACW1991 Pleurota sp.
- BOLD:ACW2251 Pleurota sp.
- BOLD:ADA2309 Pleurota sp.
- BOLD:ADB1135 Pleurota sp.
- BOLD:ADR2762 Pleurota sp.
- BOLD:AEC9409 Pleurota sp.
