= Mesophleps chloranthes =

Scientific classification
- Domain: Eukaryota
- Kingdom: Animalia
- Phylum: Arthropoda
- Class: Insecta
- Order: Lepidoptera
- Family: Gelechiidae
- Genus: Mesophleps
- Species: M. chloranthes

Binomial name
- Mesophleps chloranthes (Lower, 1900)

Synonyms
- Ypsolophus chloranthes Lower, 1900; Xerometra chloranthes; Nothris centrothetis Meyrick, 1904; Xerometra centrothetis; Nothris chloristis Meyrick, 1904; Xerometra chloristis

Species of moth

Mesophleps chloranthes is a moth of the family Gelechiidae. It is found in Australia (New South Wales, Western Australia).
