= Mesophleps aspina =

Scientific classification
- Kingdom: Animalia
- Phylum: Arthropoda
- Class: Insecta
- Order: Lepidoptera
- Family: Gelechiidae
- Genus: Mesophleps
- Species: M. aspina

Binomial name
- Mesophleps aspina H.H. Li & Sattler, 2012

Synonyms
- Brchyacma albilinella Park, 1990; Brachyacma albilinella

Species of moth

Mesophleps aspina is a moth of the family Gelechiidae. It is found in Thailand and Burma.

The wingspan is 11.5–14 millimetres (0.45–0.55 in).
