= Mesophleps argonota =

Scientific classification
- Domain: Eukaryota
- Kingdom: Animalia
- Phylum: Arthropoda
- Class: Insecta
- Order: Lepidoptera
- Family: Gelechiidae
- Genus: Mesophleps
- Species: M. argonota

Binomial name
- Mesophleps argonota (Lower, 1901)

Synonyms
- Ypsolophus argonota Lower, 1901; Megacraspedus argonota

Species of moth

Mesophleps argonota is a moth of the family Gelechiidae. It is found in Australia (New South Wales).
