= Mesophleps ochroloma =

Scientific classification
- Domain: Eukaryota
- Kingdom: Animalia
- Phylum: Arthropoda
- Class: Insecta
- Order: Lepidoptera
- Family: Gelechiidae
- Genus: Mesophleps
- Species: M. ochroloma

Binomial name
- Mesophleps ochroloma (Lower, 1901)

Synonyms
- Ypsolophus ochroloma Lower, 1901; Xerometra ochroloma

Species of moth

Mesophleps ochroloma is a moth of the family Gelechiidae. It is found in New South Wales, Australia.
