= Mesophleps trinotella =

Scientific classification
- Domain: Eukaryota
- Kingdom: Animalia
- Phylum: Arthropoda
- Class: Insecta
- Order: Lepidoptera
- Family: Gelechiidae
- Genus: Mesophleps
- Species: M. trinotella

Binomial name
- Mesophleps trinotella Herrich-Schäffer, 1856

Synonyms
- Crossobela trinotella; Mesophleps trinotellus; Uncustriodonta trinotella; Xystophora aurantiella Rebel, 1915; Crossobela barysphena Meyrick, 1923; Batrachedra subtilipennis Turati, 1924

Species of moth

Mesophleps trinotella is a moth of the family Gelechiidae. It is found in Portugal, Spain (including the Balearic Islands), France, Italy, the Czech Republic, Hungary, Turkey, Morocco, Algeria and Libya, as well as on Corsica, Sardinia, Sicily and Cyprus.

The wingspan is 8–14.5 mm. Adults are on wing from late May to September in one or two generations per year.
