= Mesophleps epiochra =

Scientific classification
- Kingdom: Animalia
- Phylum: Arthropoda
- Class: Insecta
- Order: Lepidoptera
- Family: Gelechiidae
- Genus: Mesophleps
- Species: M. epiochra

Binomial name
- Mesophleps epiochra (Meyrick, 1886)

Synonyms
- Brachyacma epiochra Meyrick, 1886; Brachyacma epichorda Turner, 1919

Species of moth

Mesophleps epiochra is a moth of the family Gelechiidae. It is found in Thailand, Papua New Guinea, Australia (Queensland, the Northern Territory, Western Australia), the Solomon Islands, Vanuatu, New Caledonia, Fiji, Western Samoa, Tonga and the Cook Islands.

The wingspan is 8–20 mm.

The larvae feed on Cassia occidentalis, Crotalaria striata, Sophora tomentosa and Vigna unguiculata. They live in the dry seed pods.
