= Mesophleps acutunca =

Scientific classification
- Kingdom: Animalia
- Phylum: Arthropoda
- Class: Insecta
- Order: Lepidoptera
- Family: Gelechiidae
- Genus: Mesophleps
- Species: M. acutunca

Binomial name
- Mesophleps acutunca H.H. Li & Sattler, 2012

Species of moth

Mesophleps acutunca is a moth of the family Gelechiidae. It is found in China (Hunan, Henan).

The wingspan is 10–11 millimetres (0.39–0.43 in).
