= Mesophleps tabellata =

Scientific classification
- Kingdom: Animalia
- Phylum: Arthropoda
- Class: Insecta
- Order: Lepidoptera
- Family: Gelechiidae
- Genus: Mesophleps
- Species: M. tabellata

Binomial name
- Mesophleps tabellata (Meyrick, 1913)

Synonyms
- Paraspistes tabellata Meyrick, 1913; Brachyacma tabellata

Species of moth

Mesophleps tabellata is a moth of the family Gelechiidae. It is found in Karnataka, India.

The wingspan is about 13.5 mm. The forewings are greyish white, with scattered black scales.
