= Mesophleps undulatella =

Scientific classification
- Kingdom: Animalia
- Phylum: Arthropoda
- Clade: Pancrustacea
- Class: Insecta
- Order: Lepidoptera
- Family: Gelechiidae
- Genus: Mesophleps
- Species: M. undulatella

Binomial name
- Mesophleps undulatella H.H. Li & Sattler, 2012

Species of moth

Mesophleps undulatella is a moth of the family Gelechiidae. It is found in Papua New Guinea.

The wingspan is 13–19.5 mm.

The larvae feed on Leucaena species. They live in their seed pods.
