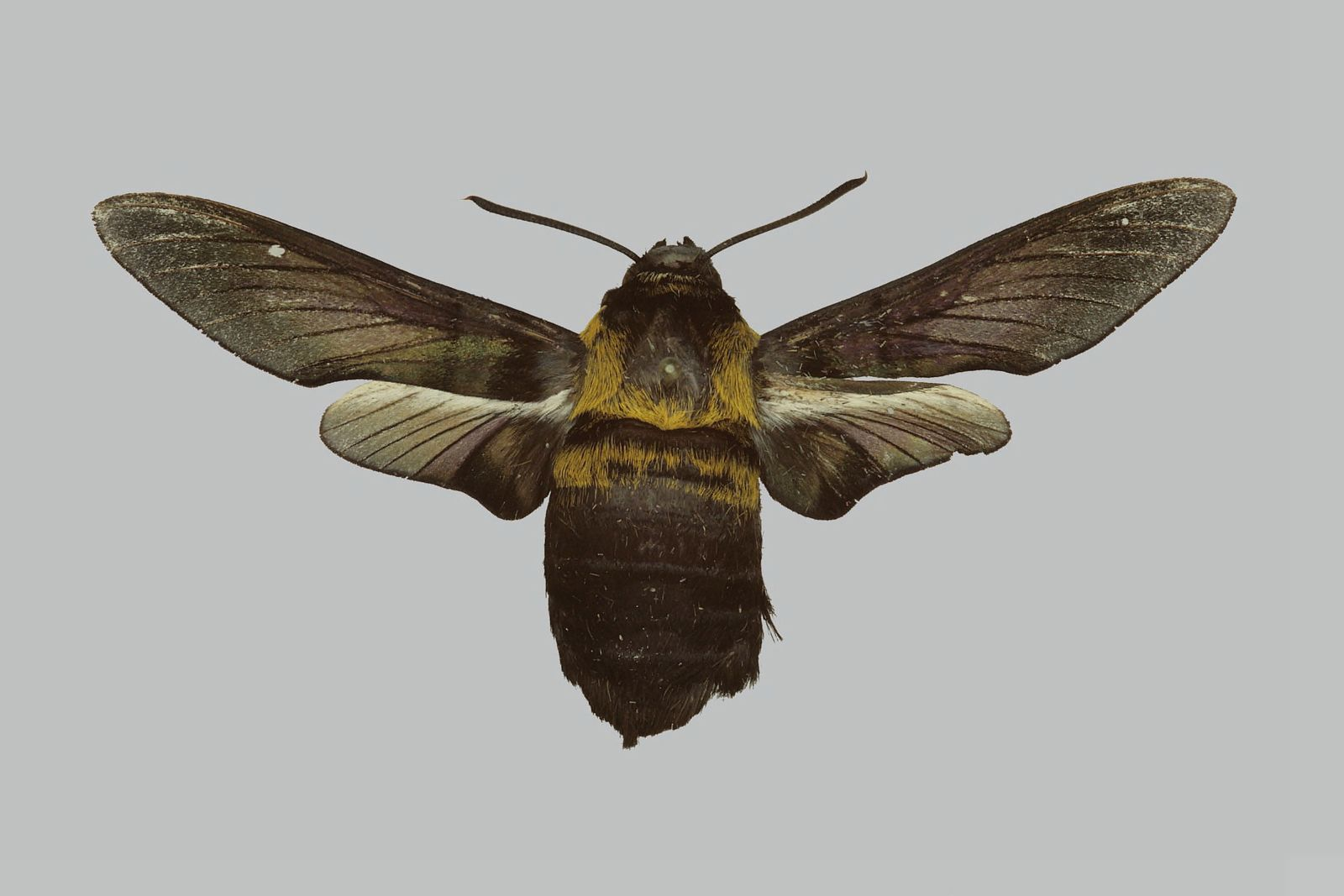

Scientific classification
- Kingdom: Animalia
- Phylum: Arthropoda
- Clade: Pancrustacea
- Class: Insecta
- Order: Lepidoptera
- Family: Sphingidae
- Genus: Sataspes
- Species: S. leyteana

Binomial name
- Sataspes leyteana Brechlin & Kitching, 2009

= Sataspes leyteana =

Species of moth

Sataspes leyteana is a species of moth of the family Sphingidae. It is known from the Philippines.
