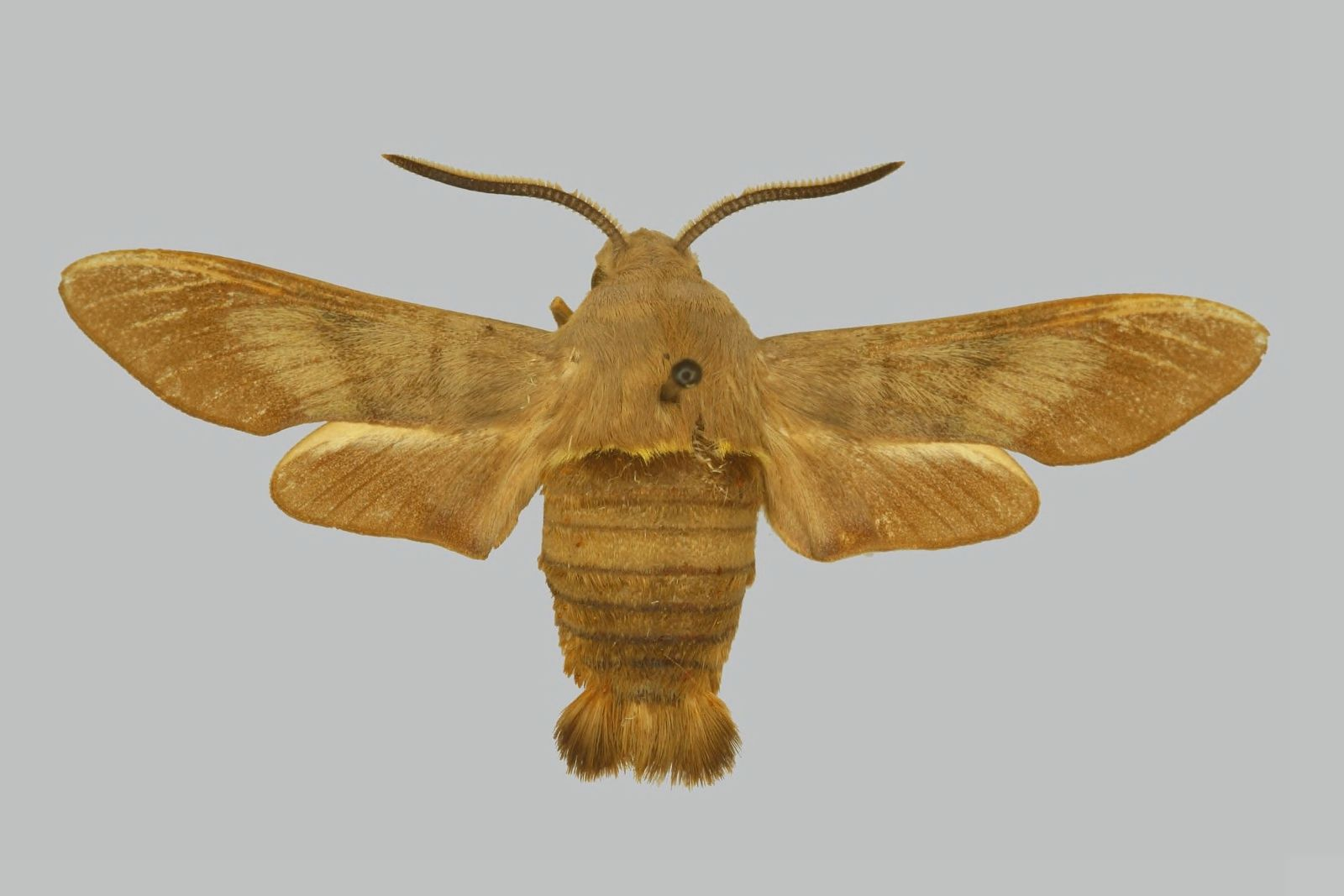

Scientific classification
- Kingdom: Animalia
- Phylum: Arthropoda
- Class: Insecta
- Order: Lepidoptera
- Family: Sphingidae
- Genus: Sataspes
- Species: S. scotti

Binomial name
- Sataspes scotti Jordan, 1926

= Sataspes scotti =

Species of moth

Sataspes scotti is a species of moth of the family Sphingidae. It is known from north-western India.
