= Mesophleps catericta =

Scientific classification
- Kingdom: Animalia
- Phylum: Arthropoda
- Class: Insecta
- Order: Lepidoptera
- Family: Gelechiidae
- Genus: Mesophleps
- Species: M. catericta

Binomial name
- Mesophleps catericta (Meyrick, 1927)

Synonyms
- Gnosimacha catericta Meyrick, 1927

Species of moth

Mesophleps catericta is a moth of the family Gelechiidae. It is found in Namibia and South Africa (Limpopo, Mpumalanga).

The wingspan is 16–17 mm. The forewings are greyish brown, sprinkled with greyish white scales.
