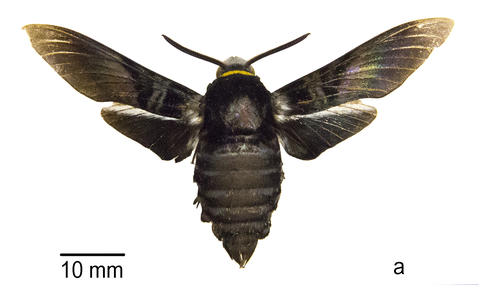

Scientific classification
- Kingdom: Animalia
- Phylum: Arthropoda
- Class: Insecta
- Order: Lepidoptera
- Family: Sphingidae
- Genus: Sataspes
- Species: S. javanica

Binomial name
- Sataspes javanica Roepke, 1941

Synonyms
- Sataspes infernalis glossatrix (Rothschild & Jordan, 1903); Sataspes tagalica pendleburyi (Clark, 1932)

= Sataspes javanica =

Species of moth

Sataspes javanica is a species of moth of the family Sphingidae. It is known from Malaysia, Java and Borneo.
