= Agonochaetia tuvella =

Scientific classification
- Domain: Eukaryota
- Kingdom: Animalia
- Phylum: Arthropoda
- Class: Insecta
- Order: Lepidoptera
- Family: Gelechiidae
- Genus: Agonochaetia
- Species: A. tuvella

Binomial name
- Agonochaetia tuvella Bidzilya, 2000

Species of moth

Agonochaetia tuvella is a moth of the family Gelechiidae. It is found in Russia (Tuva Republic).
