= Mesophleps apentheta =

Scientific classification
- Domain: Eukaryota
- Kingdom: Animalia
- Phylum: Arthropoda
- Class: Insecta
- Order: Lepidoptera
- Family: Gelechiidae
- Genus: Mesophleps
- Species: M. apentheta

Binomial name
- Mesophleps apentheta (Turner, 1919)

Synonyms
- Nothris apentheta Turner, 1919; Xerometra apentheta

Species of moth

Mesophleps apentheta is a moth of the family Gelechiidae. It is found in Australia (New South Wales).
