= Mesophleps crocina =

Scientific classification
- Kingdom: Animalia
- Phylum: Arthropoda
- Class: Insecta
- Order: Lepidoptera
- Family: Gelechiidae
- Genus: Mesophleps
- Species: M. crocina

Binomial name
- Mesophleps crocina (Meyrick, 1904)

Synonyms
- Nothris crocina Meyrick, 1904; Xerometra crocina

Species of moth

Mesophleps crocina is a moth of the family Gelechiidae. It is found in Australia (South Australia, Victoria).

The wingspan is 12–16 mm.
