= Mesophleps corsicella =

Scientific classification
- Domain: Eukaryota
- Kingdom: Animalia
- Phylum: Arthropoda
- Class: Insecta
- Order: Lepidoptera
- Family: Gelechiidae
- Genus: Mesophleps
- Species: M. corsicella

Binomial name
- Mesophleps corsicella Herrich-Schäffer, 1856

Synonyms
- Mesophleps lala Agenjo, [1961]

Species of moth

Mesophleps corsicella is a moth of the family Gelechiidae. It is found in Spain (including the Balearic Islands), Portugal, France and Italy, Greece and on Corsica, Sardinia and Sicily. Outside of Europe, it is found in Morocco and Lebanon.

The wingspan is 11–17.5 mm.

The larvae feed on Helianthemum species (including Helianthemum tuberosum), Cistus ladaniferus and possibly Cistus salviifolius and Cistus laurifolius.
