= Mesophleps gigantella =

Scientific classification
- Domain: Eukaryota
- Kingdom: Animalia
- Phylum: Arthropoda
- Class: Insecta
- Order: Lepidoptera
- Family: Gelechiidae
- Genus: Mesophleps
- Species: M. gigantella

Binomial name
- Mesophleps gigantella H.H. Li & Sattler, 2012

Species of moth

Mesophleps gigantella is a moth of the family Gelechiidae. It is found in Kenya and Uganda.

The wingspan is 16–26 mm.
