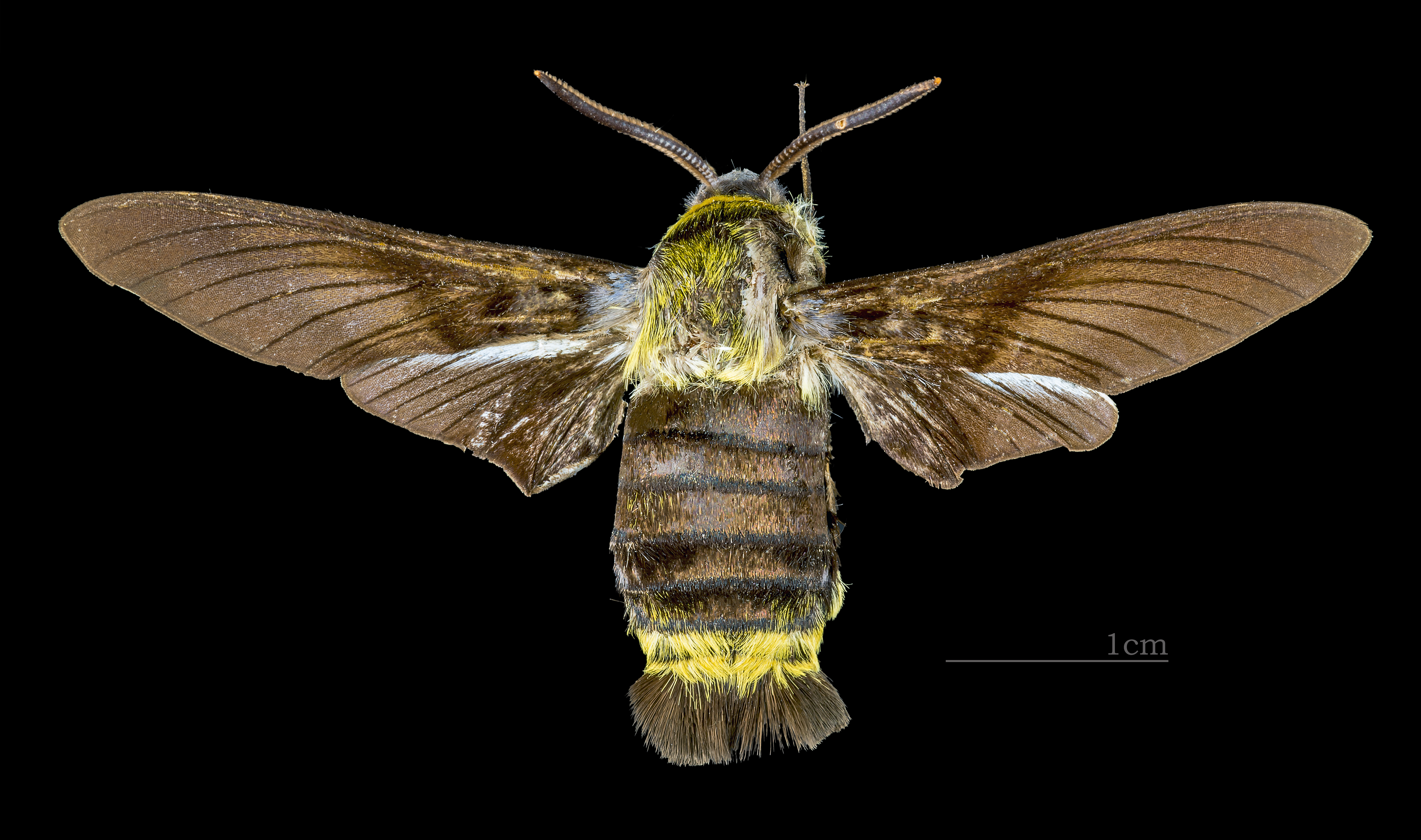
- Sataspes infernalis, type species for the genus

Scientific classification
- Domain: Eukaryota
- Kingdom: Animalia
- Phylum: Arthropoda
- Class: Insecta
- Order: Lepidoptera
- Family: Sphingidae
- Tribe: Smerinthini
- Genus: Sataspes; Moore, 1858

Synonyms
- Myodezia Boisduval, 1875

= Sataspes (moth) =

Genus of moths

Sataspes is a genus of moths in the family Sphingidae erected by Frederic Moore in 1858. They are mimics of carpenter bees.

== Species ==
- Sataspes cerberus Semper, 1896
- Sataspes infernalis (Westwood, 1847)
- Sataspes javanica Roepke, 1941
- Sataspes leyteana Brechlin & Kitching, 2009
- Sataspes negrosiana Brechlin & Kitching, 2009
- Sataspes ribbei Rober, 1885
- Sataspes scotti Jordan, 1926
- Sataspes tagalica Boisduval, 1875
- Sataspes xylocoparis Butler, 1875
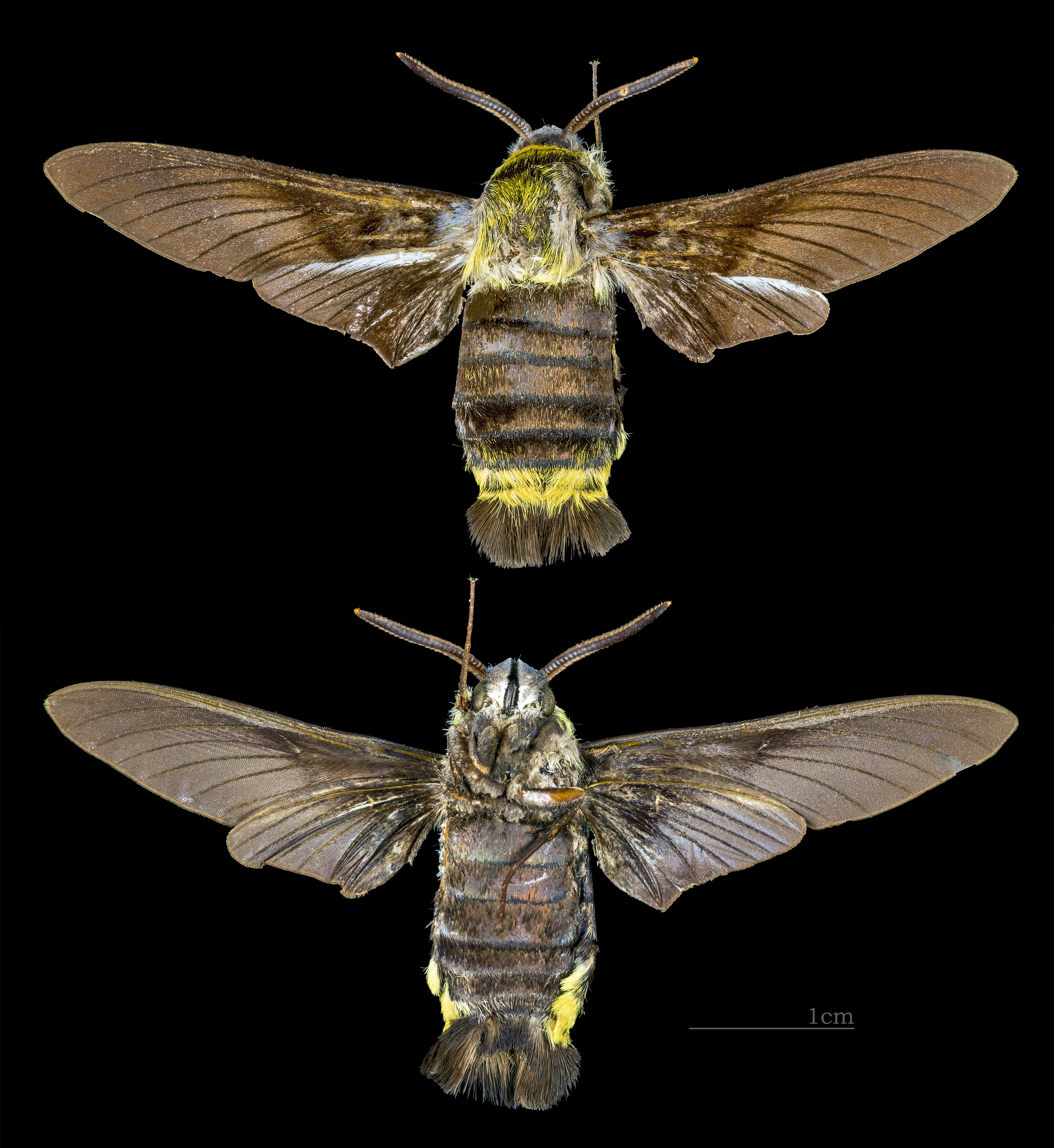
Sataspes infernalis

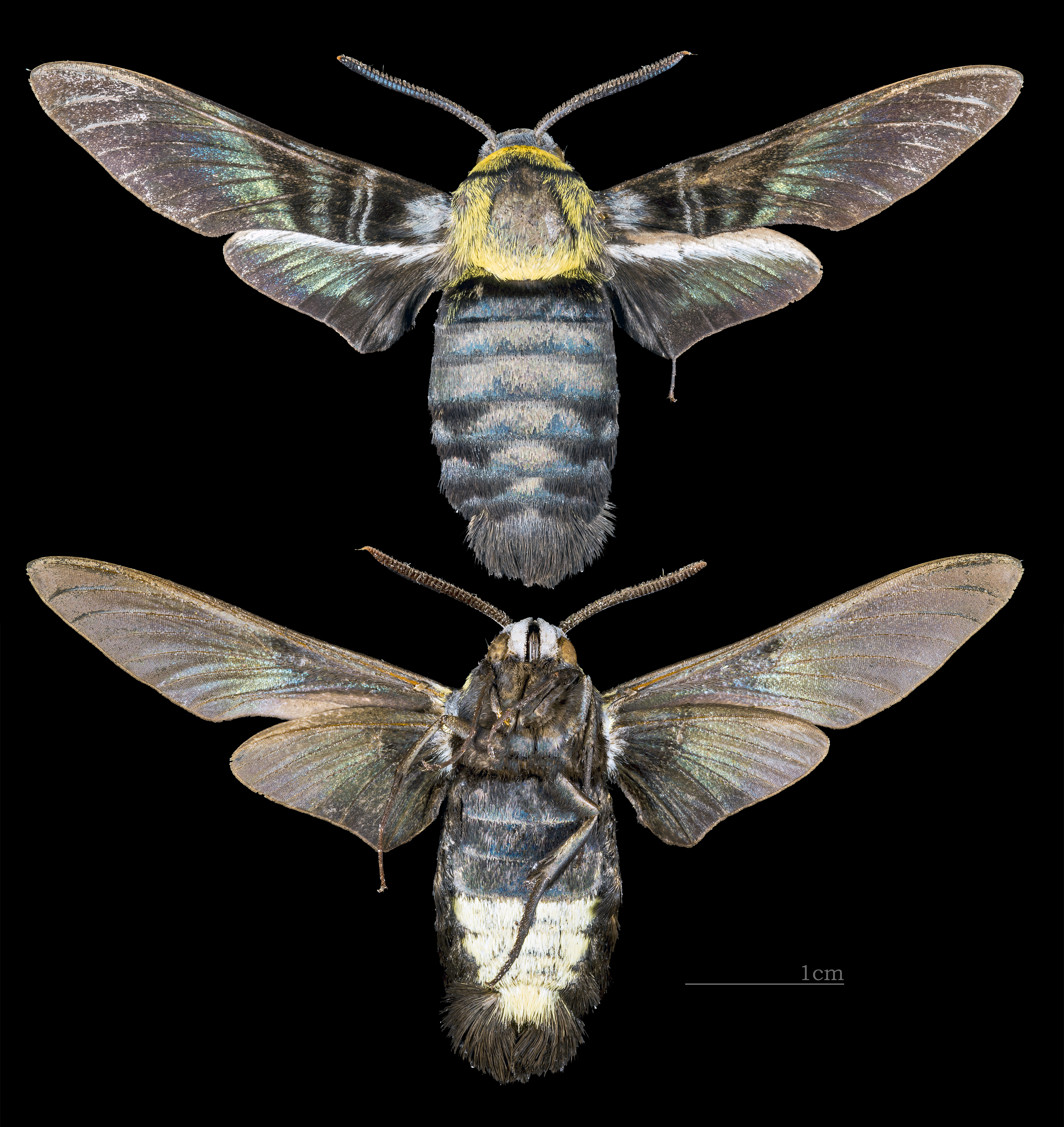
Sataspes tagalica
