= Mesophleps geodes =

Scientific classification
- Kingdom: Animalia
- Phylum: Arthropoda
- Class: Insecta
- Order: Lepidoptera
- Family: Gelechiidae
- Genus: Mesophleps
- Species: M. geodes

Binomial name
- Mesophleps geodes (Meyrick, 1929)

Synonyms
- Bucolarcha geodes Meyrick, 1929

Species of moth

Mesophleps geodes is a moth of the family Gelechiidae. It is found in South Africa (KwaZulu-Natal), Malawi, Kenya, Pakistan and India.

The wingspan is 10.5–18.5 mm.

The larvae feed on Acacia brevispica, Acacia catechu, Acacia farnesiana and Albizia lebbeck. They live in the seed pods.
