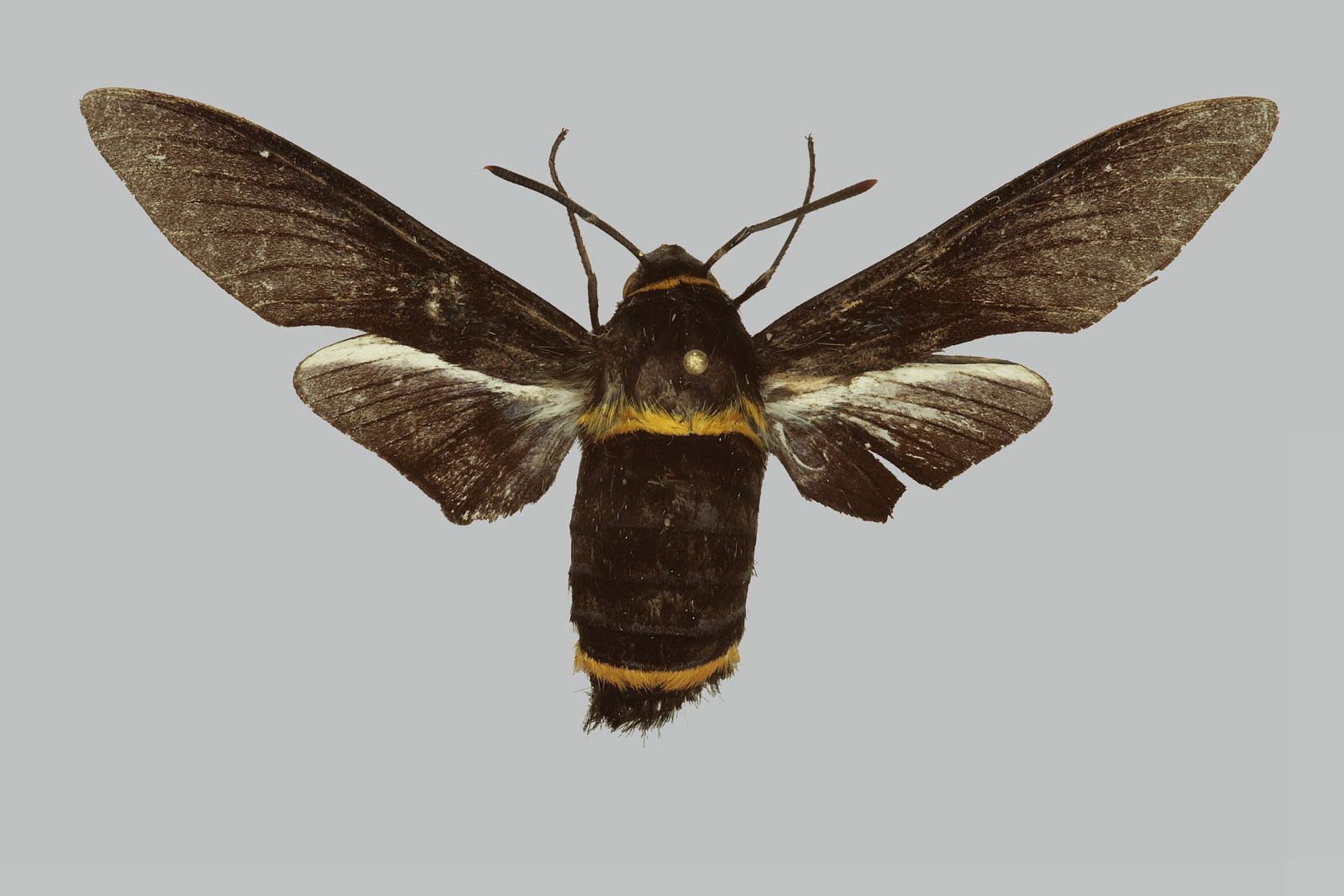
- Female

Scientific classification
- Kingdom: Animalia
- Phylum: Arthropoda
- Class: Insecta
- Order: Lepidoptera
- Family: Sphingidae
- Genus: Sataspes
- Species: S. ribbei

Binomial name
- Sataspes ribbei Rober, 1885

= Sataspes ribbei =

Species of moth

Sataspes ribbei is a species of moth of the family Sphingidae. It was discovered in Sulawesi, Indonesia.
