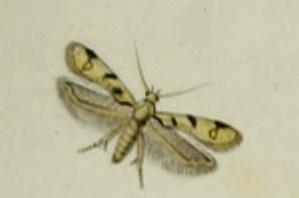

Scientific classification
- Domain: Eukaryota
- Kingdom: Animalia
- Phylum: Arthropoda
- Class: Insecta
- Order: Lepidoptera
- Family: Gelechiidae
- Genus: Mesophleps
- Species: M. oxycedrella

Binomial name
- Mesophleps oxycedrella (Millière, 1871)

Synonyms
- Gelechia oxycedrella Millière, 1871

= Mesophleps oxycedrella =

Species of moth

Mesophleps oxycedrella is a moth of the family Gelechiidae. It is found in Spain, Portugal, southern France, Italy and on Sicily the Canary Islands.

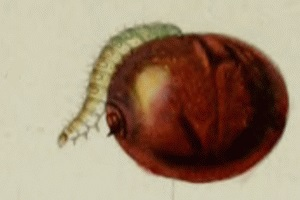
Larva with berry

The wingspan is 6.5–14 mm. Adults emerge in early July.

The larvae feed on the fruit of Juniperus oxycedrus, Juniperus phoeniceus and Juniperus macrocarpus.
