= Mesophleps ochracella =

Scientific classification
- Domain: Eukaryota
- Kingdom: Animalia
- Phylum: Arthropoda
- Class: Insecta
- Order: Lepidoptera
- Family: Gelechiidae
- Genus: Mesophleps
- Species: M. ochracella

Binomial name
- Mesophleps ochracella (Turati, 1926)

Synonyms
- Nothris ochracella Turati, 1926; Mesophleps orientella Nel & Nel, 2003; Mesophleps gallicella Varenne & Nel, 2011

Species of moth

Mesophleps ochracella is a moth of the family Gelechiidae. It is found in Spain (including the Balearic Islands), France (Alpes-Maritimes), Malta, Greece (Lakonia and Crete), Morocco, Algeria, Libya, Italy, and probably Turkmenistan.

The wingspan is 9–16.5 mm.

The larvae probably feed on Cruciferae species.
