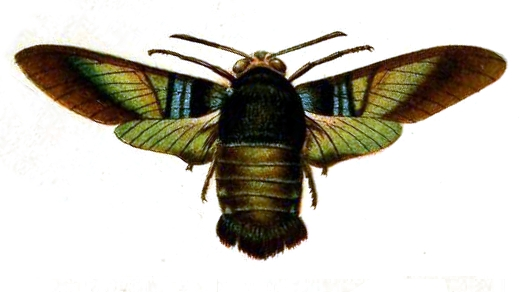
- From Lionel de Nicéville's 1900 "On new and little-known Lepidoptera from the Oriental region"

Scientific classification
- Kingdom: Animalia
- Phylum: Arthropoda
- Class: Insecta
- Order: Lepidoptera
- Family: Sphingidae
- Genus: Sataspes
- Species: S. tagalica

Binomial name
- Sataspes tagalica Boisduval, 1875

Synonyms
- Sataspes hauxwellii de Nicéville, 1900; Sataspes ventralis Butler, 1875; Sataspes tagalica chinensis Mell, 1922; Sataspes tagalica collaris Rothschild & Jordan, 1903; Sataspes tagalica protomelas (Seitz, 1929); Sataspes tagalica thoracica Rothschild & Jordan, 1903

= Sataspes tagalica =

Species of moth

Sataspes tagalica, the brilliant carpenter-bee hawkmoth, is a species of moth of the family Sphingidae first described by Jean Baptiste Boisduval in 1875.

== Distribution ==
It is known from western and north-eastern India, Nepal, Myanmar, eastern and southern China and Thailand. The habitat consists of woodland margins and shady tracks through woodland, particularly near bodies of fresh water.

== Description ==
The wingspan is 56–70 mm.

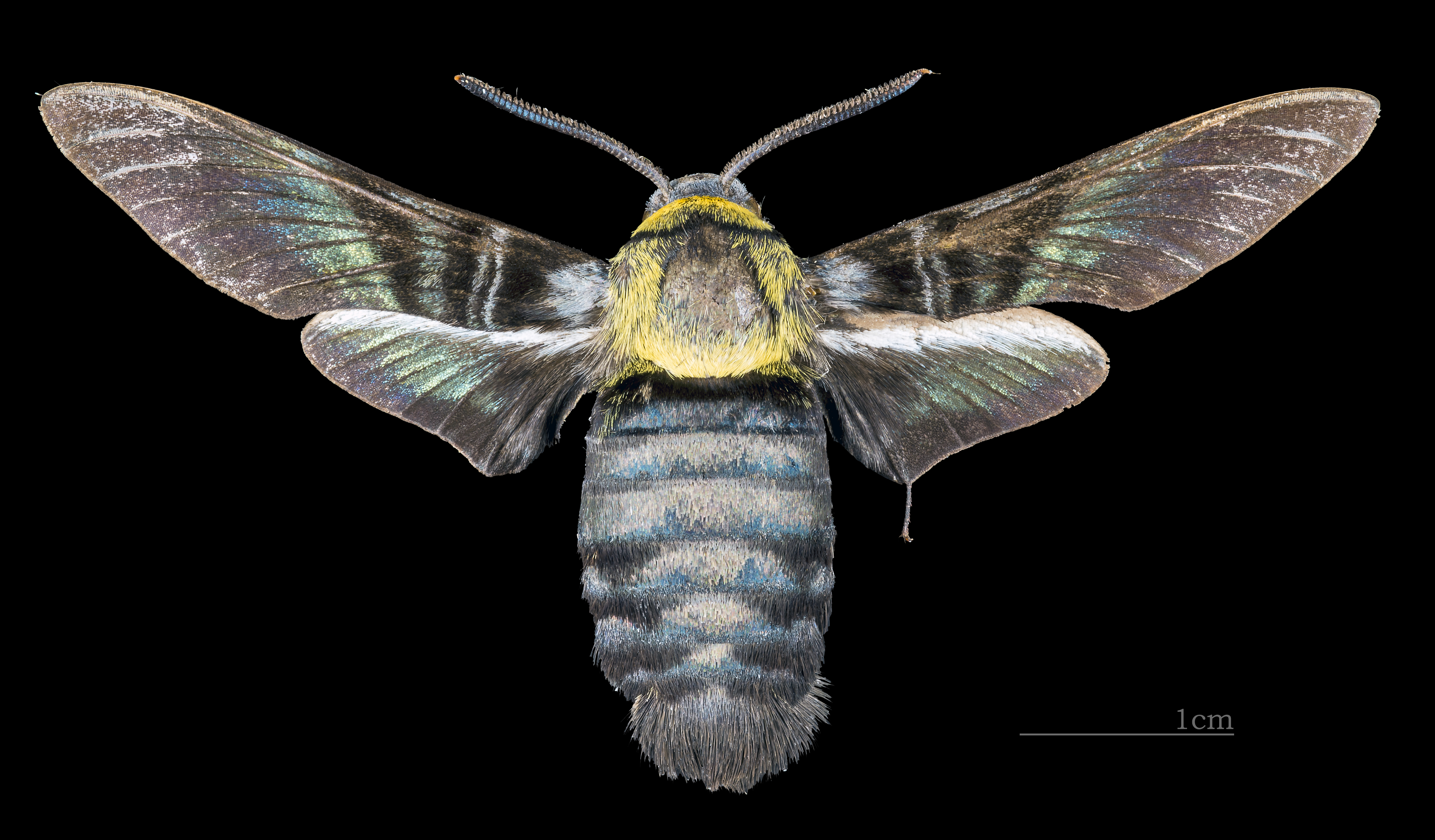
Male dorsal view

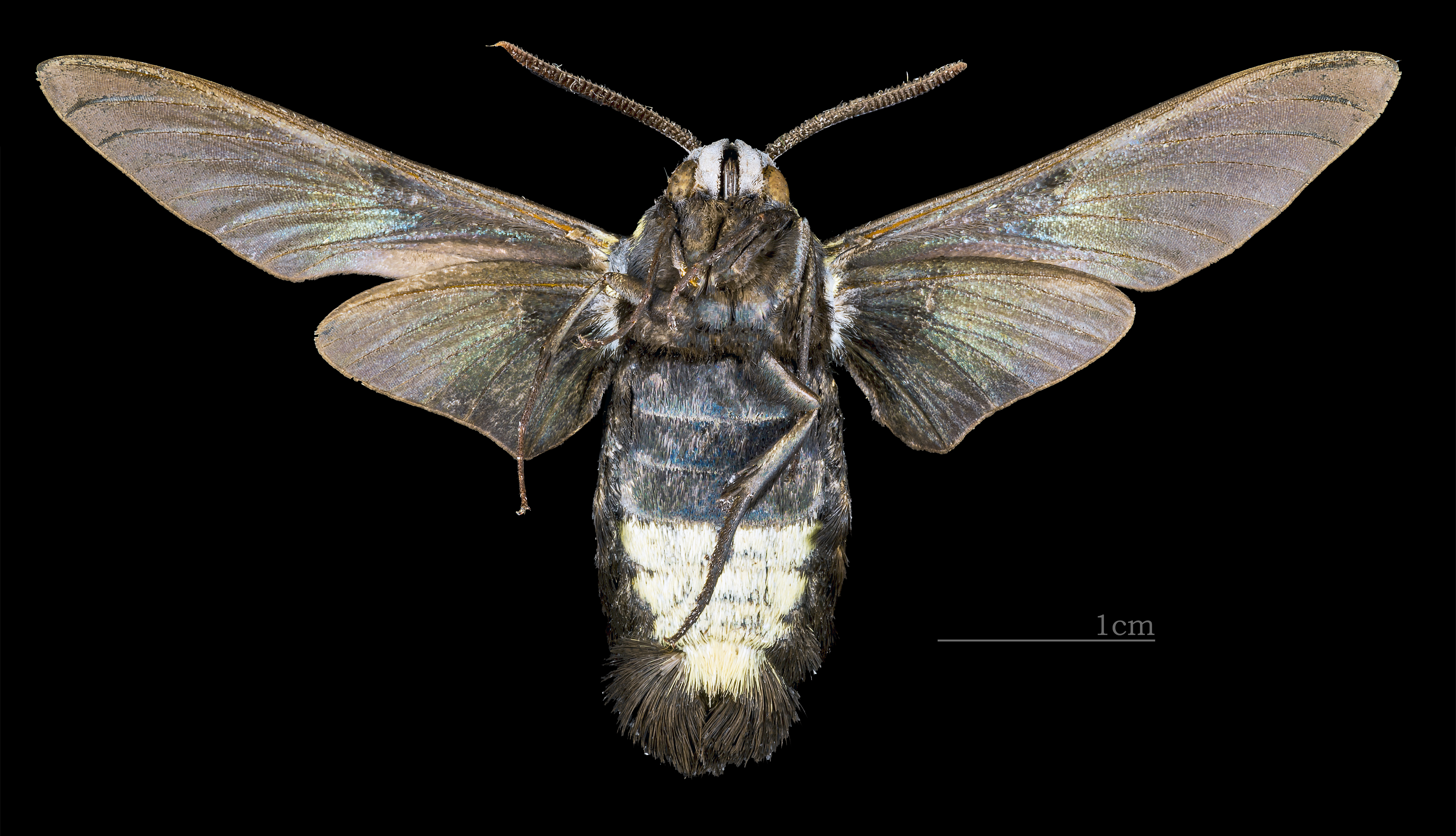
Male ventral view

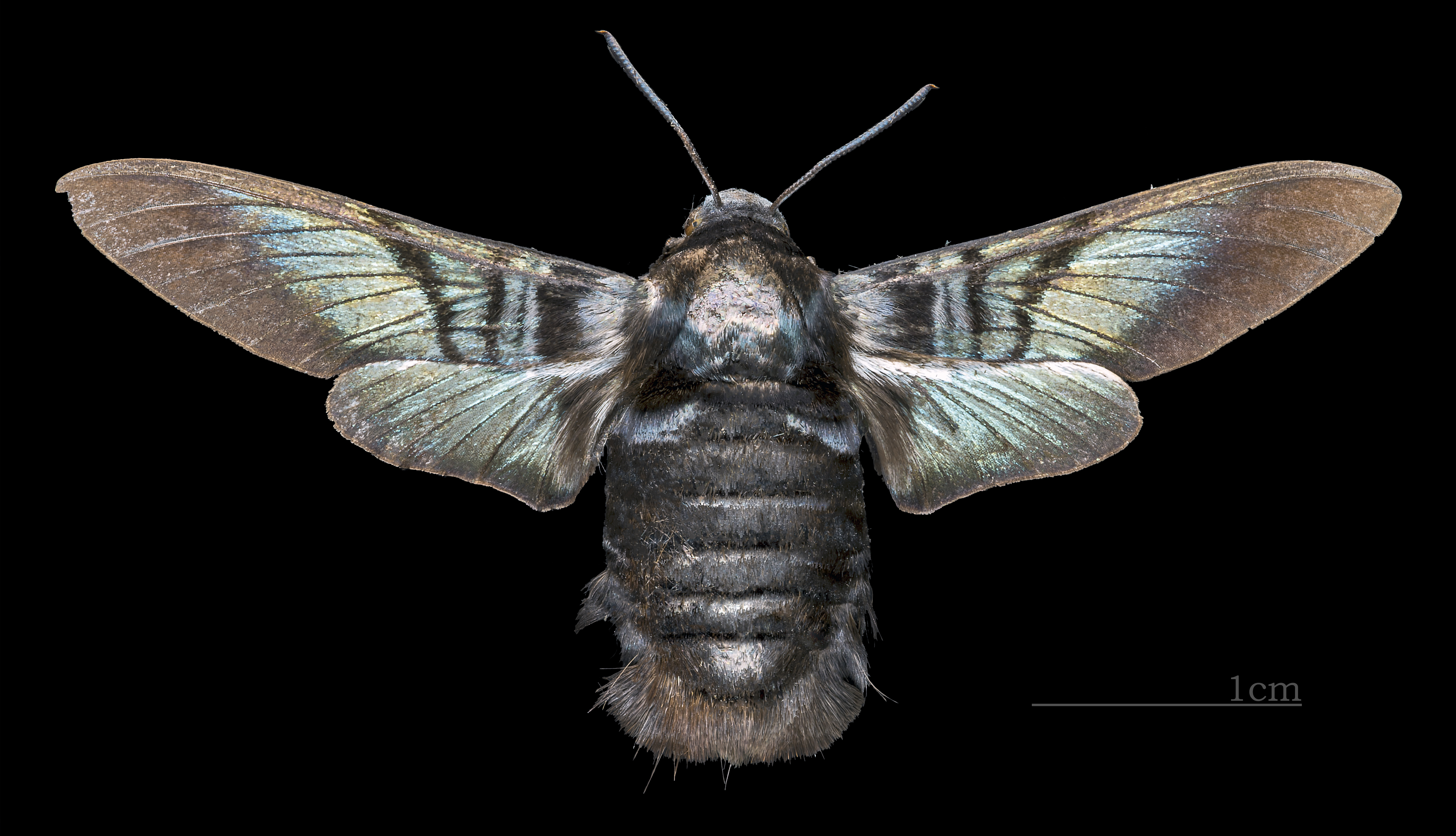
Female dorsal view

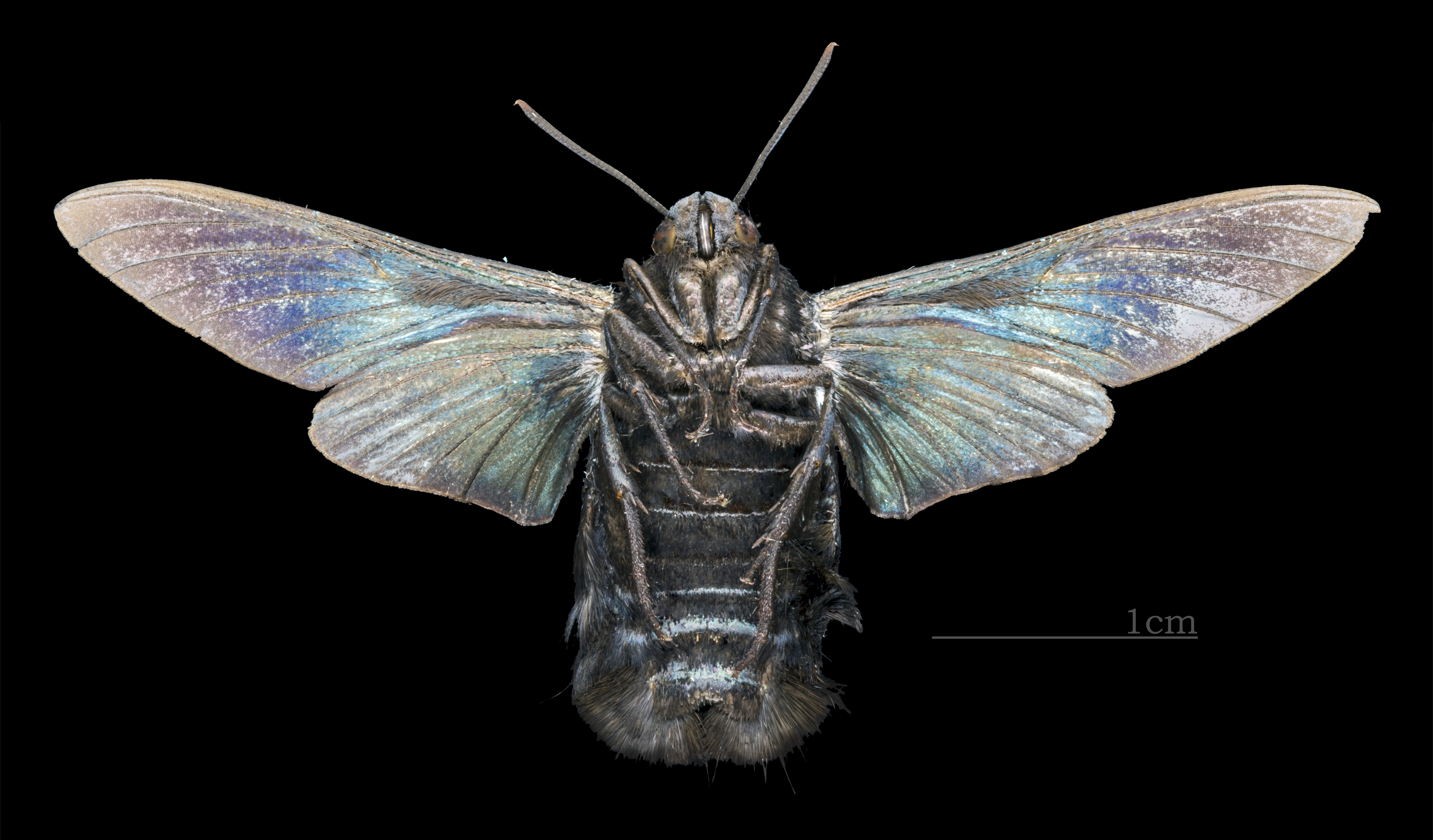
Female ventral view

== Biology ==
It is a day-flying species. Adults are attracted to the flowers of Duranta erecta and Lantana camara.

The larvae have been recorded feeding on Dalbergia benthamii in Hong Kong.
