= Mesophleps bifidella =

Scientific classification
- Domain: Eukaryota
- Kingdom: Animalia
- Phylum: Arthropoda
- Class: Insecta
- Order: Lepidoptera
- Family: Gelechiidae
- Genus: Mesophleps
- Species: M. bifidella

Binomial name
- Mesophleps bifidella H.H. Li & Sattler, 2012

Species of moth

Mesophleps bifidella is a moth of the family Gelechiidae. It is found on the island of Kyushu in Japan and the island of Luzon in the Philippines.

The wingspan is 14.5–18.5 mm.
