= Sataspes negrosiana =

Scientific classification
- Kingdom: Animalia
- Phylum: Arthropoda
- Clade: Pancrustacea
- Class: Insecta
- Order: Lepidoptera
- Family: Sphingidae
- Genus: Sataspes
- Species: S. negrosiana

Binomial name
- Sataspes negrosiana Brechlin & Kitching, 2009

Species of moth

Sataspes negrosiana is a species of moth of the family Sphingidae. It is known from the Philippines.
