= Agonochaetia terrestrella =

Scientific classification
- Kingdom: Animalia
- Phylum: Arthropoda
- Clade: Pancrustacea
- Class: Insecta
- Order: Lepidoptera
- Family: Gelechiidae
- Genus: Agonochaetia
- Species: A. terrestrella

Binomial name
- Agonochaetia terrestrella (Zeller, 1872)

Synonyms
- Gelechia terrestrella Zeller, 1872; Gelechia muestairella Müller-Rutz, 1922

Species of moth

Agonochaetia terrestrella is a moth of the family Gelechiidae. It is found in Switzerland, Albania and Romania.
