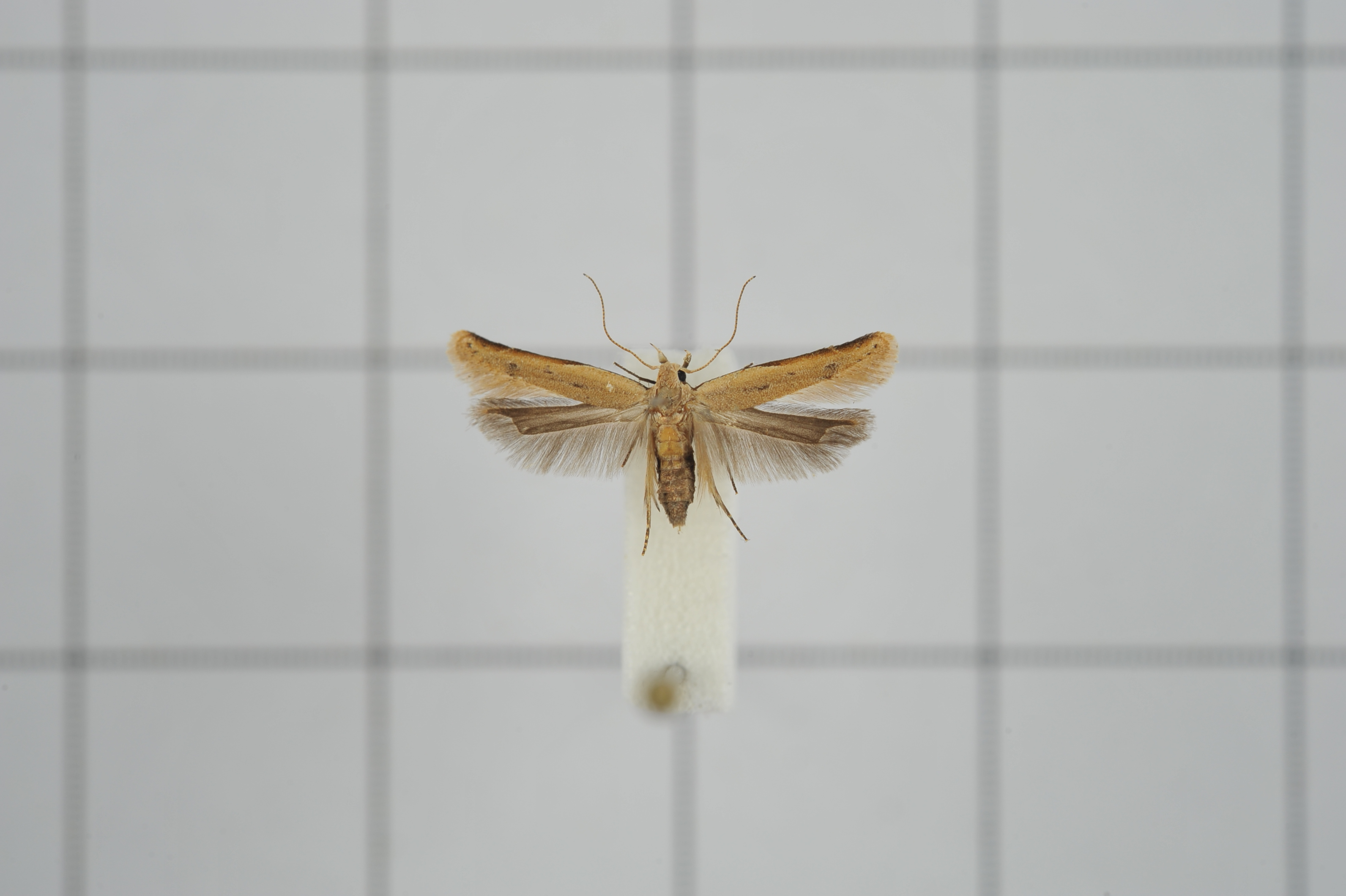

Scientific classification
- Domain: Eukaryota
- Kingdom: Animalia
- Phylum: Arthropoda
- Class: Insecta
- Order: Lepidoptera
- Family: Gelechiidae
- Genus: Mesophleps
- Species: M. sublutiana

Binomial name
- Mesophleps sublutiana (Park, 1990)

Synonyms
- Brachyacma sublutiana Park, 1990

= Mesophleps sublutiana =

Species of moth

Mesophleps sublutiana is a moth of the family Gelechiidae. It is found in Korea, China (Anhui, Guizhou, Hebei, Henan, Hong Kong, Hubei, Shaanxi, Shandong, Yunnan), Taiwan, Thailand, Malaysia (Brunei), Indonesia, Nepal, India and Sri Lanka.

The wingspan is 10–16 mm.

The larvae feed on Cajanus cajan, Indigofera, Robinia pseudoacacia and Parkinsonia aculeata. They feed in the pods.
