= Mesophleps albilinella =

Scientific classification
- Domain: Eukaryota
- Kingdom: Animalia
- Phylum: Arthropoda
- Class: Insecta
- Order: Lepidoptera
- Family: Gelechiidae
- Genus: Mesophleps
- Species: M. albilinella

Binomial name
- Mesophleps albilinella (Park, 1990)

Synonyms
- Brchyacma albilinella Park, 1990; Brachyacma albilinella

Species of moth

Mesophleps albilinella is a moth of the family Gelechiidae. It is found in Korea and China (Guizhou, Hebei, Henan, Hubei, Hunan, Shaanxi and Tianjin).

The wingspan is 8–16 mm.
