= Agonochaetia impunctella =

Scientific classification
- Domain: Eukaryota
- Kingdom: Animalia
- Phylum: Arthropoda
- Class: Insecta
- Order: Lepidoptera
- Family: Gelechiidae
- Genus: Agonochaetia
- Species: A. impunctella

Binomial name
- Agonochaetia impunctella (Caradja, 1920)

Synonyms
- Brachmia impunctella Caradja, 1920; Aristotelia impunctella

Species of moth

Agonochaetia impunctella is a moth of the family Gelechiidae. It is found in the Russian Far East.
