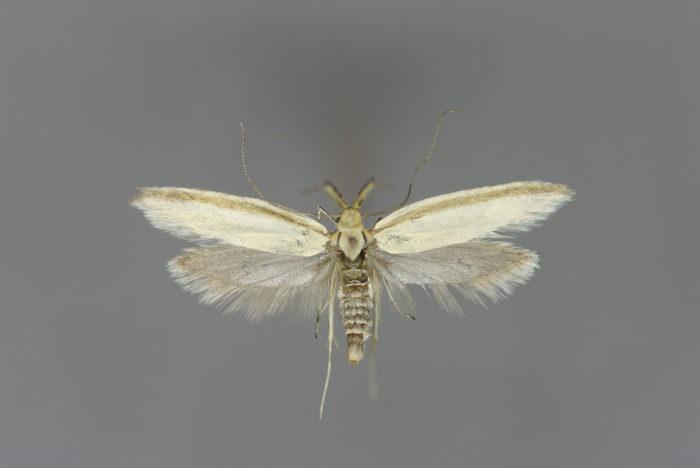

Scientific classification
- Domain: Eukaryota
- Kingdom: Animalia
- Phylum: Arthropoda
- Class: Insecta
- Order: Lepidoptera
- Family: Oecophoridae
- Genus: Pleurota
- Species: P. pyropella

Binomial name
- Pleurota pyropella (Denis & Schiffermüller, 1775)

Synonyms
- Tinea pyropella Denis & Schiffermüller, 1775; Pleurota salviella Herrich-Schäffer, 1854; Pleurota luteella Rebel, 1927; Pleurota semicanella Constant, 1885; Pleurota idalia Meyrick, 1923

= Pleurota pyropella =

Species of moth

Pleurota pyropella is a moth of the family Oecophoridae. It is found in Portugal, France, Germany, Italy, Austria, Switzerland, the Czech Republic, Slovakia, Albania, Croatia, Slovenia, Bosnia and Herzegovina, Serbia, Hungary, Bulgaria, Romania, North Macedonia, Greece, Turkey, Ukraine, Russia, as well as on Corsica, Sicily, Cyprus and Crete. Outside of the Europe, the range extends to the eastern Palearctic. The species is also present in the Near East and North Africa.

== Subspecies ==
- Pleurota pyropella pyropella
- Pleurota pyropella candia Back, 1973
- Pleurota pyropella siciliana Back, 1973 (Sicily)
- Pleurota pyropella idalia Meyrick, 1923 (Cyprus)
- Pleurota pyropella semicanella Constant, 1885 (Corsica)
