= Geode (trade association) =

GEODE (Groupement Européen des entreprises et Organismes de Distribution d'Energie) is a trade association that represents independent energy distribution and distribution-related companies, as well as other organisations in natural gas and electricity, privately or publicly owned, in Europe. It was founded in 1991 and, as of June 2025, represents over 1400 privately and publicly owned companies in 13 countries.

GEODE took part in the Gas Regulatory Forum in Madrid in March 2012, and the Electricity Regulatory Forum in Florence in May 2012, both organized by the European Commission. GEODE defends the interests of local distributors before energy authorities on the national and international levels and allows the exchange of expertise, the share of data, and competence.
