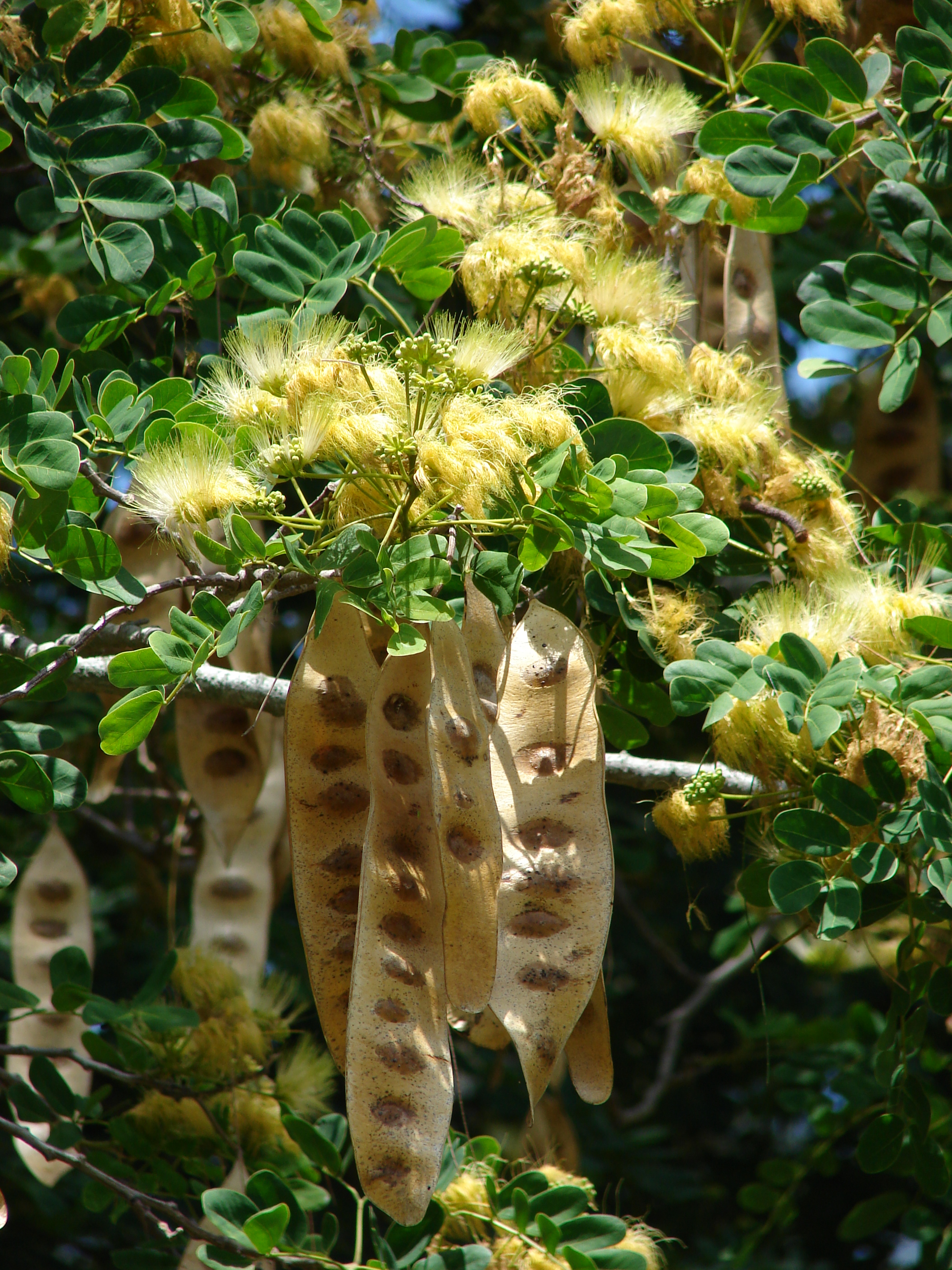

Conservation status
- Least Concern (IUCN 3.1)

Scientific classification
- Kingdom: Plantae
- Clade: Tracheophytes
- Clade: Angiosperms
- Clade: Eudicots
- Clade: Rosids
- Order: Fabales
- Family: Fabaceae
- Subfamily: Caesalpinioideae
- Clade: Mimosoid clade
- Genus: Albizia
- Species: A. lebbeck

Binomial name
- Albizia lebbeck (L.) Benth.

Synonyms
- See Taxonomy

= Albizia lebbeck =

Species of legume

Albizia lebbeck is a species of plant in the family Fabaceae, native to the Indian subcontinent and Myanmar. It is widely cultivated and naturalised in other tropical and subtropical regions, including Australia. Common names in English include siris, Indian siris, East Indian walnut, Broome raintree, lebbeck, lebbek tree, frywood, koko and woman's tongue tree. The latter name is a play on the sound the seeds make as they rattle inside the pods. Siris is also a common name of the genus Albizia.

== Description ==
It is a tree growing to a height of 18–30 m (59–98 ft) tall with a trunk .5 to 1 m (1 ft 8 in to 3 ft 3 in) in diameter. The leaves are bipinnate, 7.5–15 cm (3–6 in) long, with one to four pairs of pinnae, each pinna with 6–18 leaflets. The flowers are white, with numerous 2.5–3.8 cm (1.0–1.5 in) long stamens, and very fragrant. The fruit is a pod 15–30 cm (6–12 in) long and 2.5–5.0 cm (1–2 in) broad, containing six to twelve seeds.

== Habitat ==
Albizia lebbeck is found in a wide range of climates ranging from semi-desert, to humid regions. It can endure long cold winters, as well as very dry climate. A. lebbeck is a drought-tolerant tree that can be found throughout the tropics. Due to its ability to adapt to a broad spectrum of climates, this species has spread to different tropical regions throughout the world as an invasive species.

== Name ==
Mimosa speciosa as described by Nikolaus Joseph von Jacquin refers to Albizia lebbeck. Mimosa speciosa of Carl Peter Thunberg, however, is Albizia julibrissin. The species epithet 'lebbeck' is derived from the Arabic word (لَبَّخ).

Albizia is named after Francesco Albizzi, an Italian naturalist. It is also commonly referred to as siris, its Hindi name.

In the West Indies and certain parts of South America this tree is known as a 'Shak Shak Tree' because of the sound the seeds make in the pod.

== Uses ==
Its uses include environmental management, forage, medicine and wood. It is cultivated as a shade tree in North and South America. In India and Pakistan, the tree is used to produce timber. Wood from Albizia lebbeck has a density of 0.55-0.66 g/cm^{3} or higher.

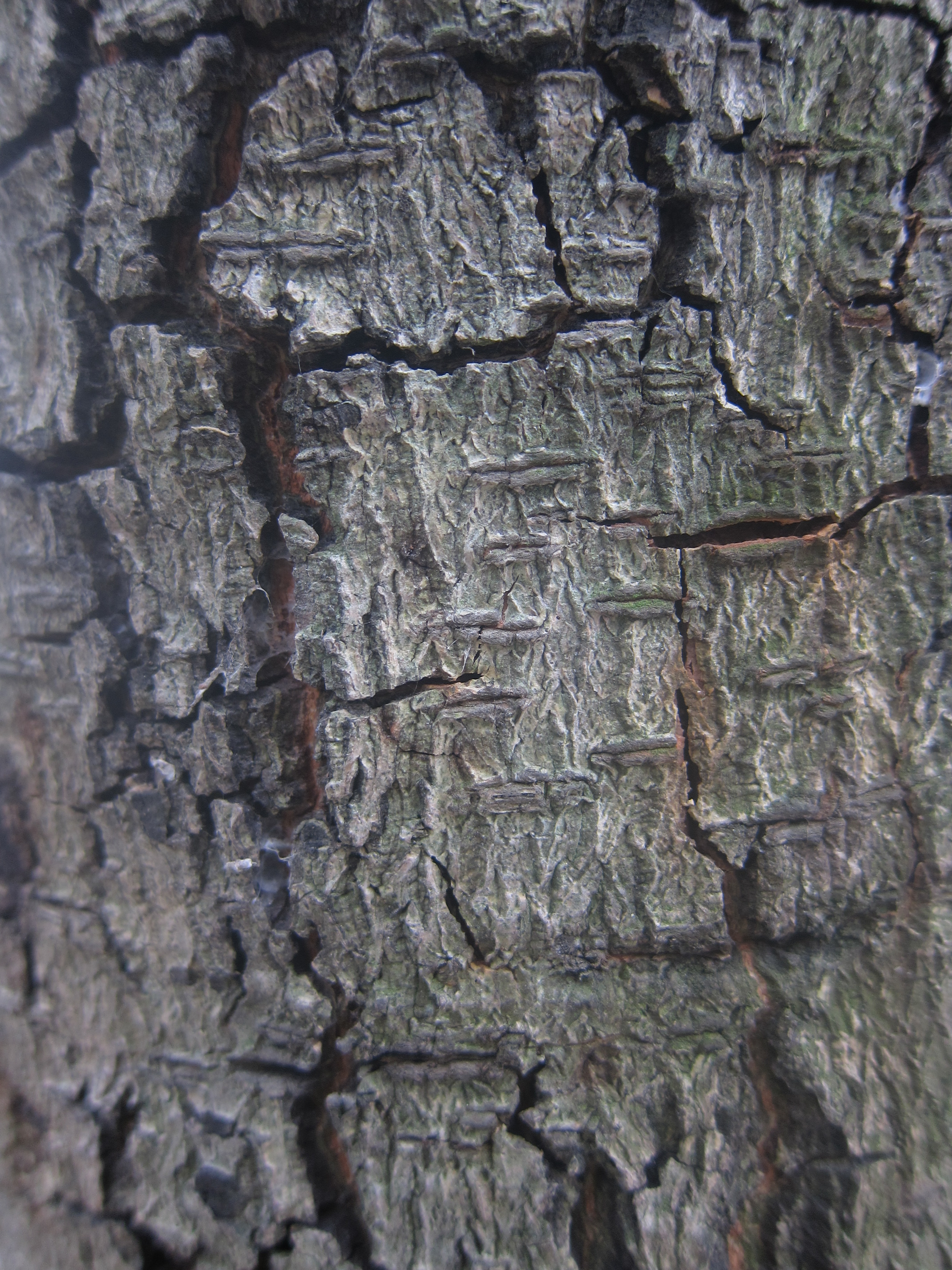
Bark on a tree in Hong Kong

Even where it is not native, some indigenous herbivores are liable to utilize lebbeck as a food resource. For example, the greater rhea (Rhea americana) has been observed feeding on it in the cerrado of Brazil.

=== Ethnobotany ===
Lebbeck is an astringent, also used by some cultures to treat boils, cough, to treat the eye, flu, gingivitis, lung problems, pectoral problems, is used as a tonic, and is used to treat abdominal tumors. The bark is used medicinally to treat inflammation. This information was obtained via ethnobotanical records, which are a reference to how a plant is used by indigenous peoples, not verifiable, scientific or medical evaluation of the effectiveness of these claims. Albizia lebbeck is also psychoactive. It is also very effective in migraine. All parts of the plant are useful, such as the leaves, root, and stem. The flowers of the plant are traditionally used in Chinese traditional medicine to treat insomnia.

== Taxonomy ==
Albizia lebbeck

The taxonomic history of A. lebbeck is somewhat convoluted. It was originally described by Carl Linnaeus as Mimosa lebbeck. In its original description the Mimosa lebbeck was a large Acacia tree that grew in Egypt. George Bentham placed the species in its present genus, but other authors believed that the plant described by Linnaeus was the related Albizia kalkora as described by Prain (based on the Mimosa kalkora of William Roxburgh), and erroneously referred to this species as Albizia lebbeck. However, Francisco Manuel Blanco used Mimosa lebbeck to refer to Albizia retusa ssp. retusa. In addition, the specific epithet is occasionally misspelled lebbek.

Junior synonyms are:

- Acacia lebbeck (L.) Willd.
- Acacia macrophylla Bunge
- Acacia speciosa (Jacq.) Willd.
- Albizia latifolia B.Boivin
- Albizia lebbeck (L.) Benth. var. leucoxylon Hassk.
- Albizia lebbeck (L.) Benth. var. pubescens Haines
- Albizia lebbeck (L.) Benth. var. rostrata Haines

Albizia rostrata Miq. is Archidendron globosum.

- Feuilleea lebbeck (L.) Kuntze
- Inga borbonica Hassk.
- Inga leucoxylon Hassk.
- Mimosa lebbeck L.
- Mimosa lebbek L. (orth.var.)
- Mimosa sirissa Roxb.
- Mimosa speciosa Jacq.

Mimosa speciosa Thunb. is Albizia julibrissin.

- Pithecellobium splitgerberianum Miq.

Independently, there also exists a genus named Lebeckia, whose range is restricted to South Africa. It is also a legume, but a member of the Faboideae, a different legume subfamily.
