= Chamaesphecia doleriformis =

Scientific classification
- Kingdom: Animalia
- Phylum: Arthropoda
- Clade: Pancrustacea
- Class: Insecta
- Order: Lepidoptera
- Family: Sesiidae
- Genus: Chamaesphecia
- Subgenus: Scopulosphecia
- Species: C. doleriformis

Binomial name
- Chamaesphecia doleriformis (Herrich-Schaffer, 1846)

Synonyms
- Sesia doleriformis Herrich-Schaffer, 1846 (nec Walker, 1856); Sesia colpiformis Staudinger, 1856; Chamaesphecia colpiformis

Species of moth

Chamaesphecia doleriformis is a moth of the family Sesiidae. It is found in Italy, Austria, the Czech Republic, Slovakia, the Balkan Peninsula, Ukraine, Russia and Turkey.

The larvae feed on Salvia austriaca, Salvia pratensis, Salvia nemorosa, Salvia sclarea and Salvia verbenaca.

== Subspecies ==
- Chamaesphecia doleriformis doleriformis (Italy, Istria to Dalmatia and to Greece)
- Chamaesphecia doleriformis colpiformis (Staudinger, 1856)
