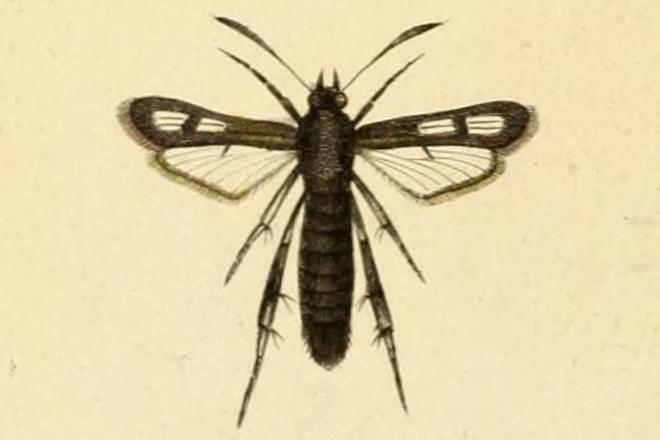

Scientific classification
- Kingdom: Animalia
- Phylum: Arthropoda
- Clade: Pancrustacea
- Class: Insecta
- Order: Lepidoptera
- Family: Sesiidae
- Genus: Chamaesphecia
- Subgenus: Chamaesphecia
- Species: C. anthraciformis

Binomial name
- Chamaesphecia anthraciformis (Rambur, 1832)

Synonyms
- Sesia anthraciformis Rambur, 1832; Sesia foeniformis Herrich-Schäffer, 1846; Sesia phoeniformis Failla-Tedaldi, 1883; Sesia oryssiformis Herrich-Schäffer, 1846; Sesia oryssiformis Rebel, 1901 (nec Herrich-Schäffer, 1846); Aegeria agriliformis Walker, 1856; Sesia joppiformis Staudinger, 1856; Sesia lahayei Oberthür, 1890; Sesia seitzi Püngeler, 1905; Sesia suprema Oberthür, 1907; Dipsosphecia louisae Le Cerf, 1915; Chamaesphecia anthraciformis f. meieri Stauder, 1921; Pyropteron phoenix Le Cerf, 1925; Pyroptera anthraciformis f. aicha Le Cerf, 1925; Pyropteron anthraciformis f. pallipes Le Cerf, 1925; Pyropteron major Rothschild, 1925; Pyropteron reisseri Capuse, 1973

= Chamaesphecia anthraciformis =

Species of moth

Chamaesphecia anthraciformis is a moth of the family Sesiidae. It is found in Italy and on Sicily, Corsica and Sardinia. It is also found in Morocco, Algeria, Tunisia and the Levant.

The larvae feed on Euphorbia nicaeensis, Euphorbia atlantica, Euphorbia myrsinites, Euphorbia ceratocarpa and Euphorbia characia.
