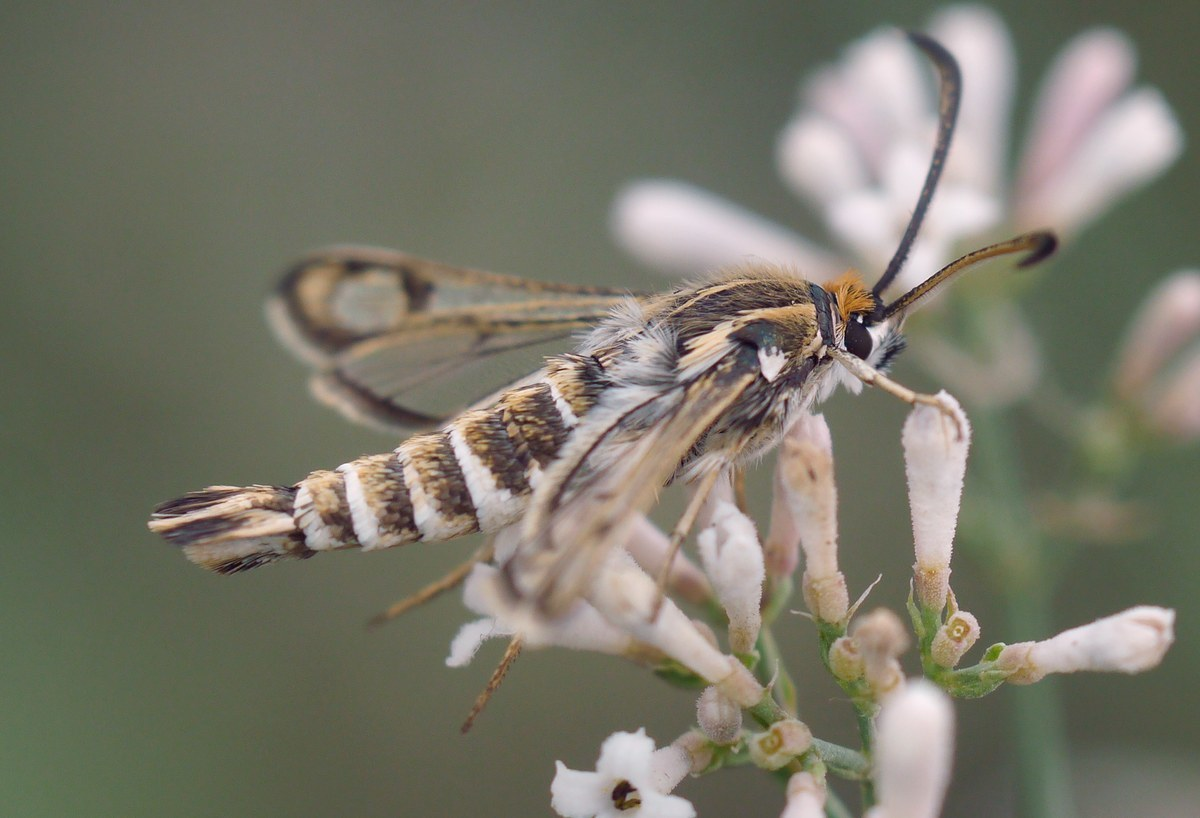

Scientific classification
- Kingdom: Animalia
- Phylum: Arthropoda
- Clade: Pancrustacea
- Class: Insecta
- Order: Lepidoptera
- Family: Sesiidae
- Genus: Chamaesphecia
- Subgenus: Chamaesphecia
- Species: C. bibioniformis

Binomial name
- Chamaesphecia bibioniformis (Esper, 1800)

Synonyms
- Sphinx bibioniformis Esper, 1800; Sesia tengyraeformis Boisduval, 1840 (nec Herrich-Schäffer, 1851); Sesia monspeliensis Staudinger, 1856; Chamaesphecia myrsinites Pinker, 1954; Sesia philanthiformis Herrich-Schäffer, 1846 (nec Laspeyres, 1801)

= Chamaesphecia bibioniformis =

Species of moth

Chamaesphecia bibioniformis is a moth of the family Sesiidae. It is found in southern Europe (from Spain to southern Russia) and from Asia Minor to Kyrgyzstan.

The wingspan is 19–21 mm. Adults are on wing in June and July.

The larvae feed on Euphorbia species, including Euphorbia gerardiana, Euphorbia sequieriana, Euphorbia myrsinites, Euphorbia angustifrons, Euphorbia serrata, Euphorbia nicaeensis, Euphorbia niciciana, Euphorbia pannonica and Euphorbia macroclada.
