= Phytoecia balcanica =

Scientific classification
- Domain: Eukaryota
- Kingdom: Animalia
- Phylum: Arthropoda
- Class: Insecta
- Order: Coleoptera
- Suborder: Polyphaga
- Infraorder: Cucujiformia
- Family: Cerambycidae
- Genus: Phytoecia
- Species: P. balcanica

Binomial name
- Phytoecia balcanica (Frivaldsky, 1835)

Synonyms
- Saperda balcanica Frivaldsky, 1835; Helladia balcanica (Frivaldsky) Pic, 1903; Oberea balcanica (Frivaldsky) Küster, 1848; Neomusaria balcanica (Frivaldszky) Sama

Species of beetle

Phytoecia balcanica is a species of beetle in the family Cerambycidae. It was described by Frivaldsky in 1835, originally under the genus Saperda. It is known from Turkey, Bulgaria and Crete. It feeds on Salvia sclarea.

== Varietas ==
- Phytoecia balcanica var. subvitticollis Breuning, 1951
- Phytoecia balcanica var. candiana Plavilstshikov, 1930
