= Chamaesphecia schmidtiiformis =

Scientific classification
- Kingdom: Animalia
- Phylum: Arthropoda
- Clade: Pancrustacea
- Class: Insecta
- Order: Lepidoptera
- Family: Sesiidae
- Genus: Chamaesphecia
- Subgenus: Scopulosphecia
- Species: C. schmidtiiformis

Binomial name
- Chamaesphecia schmidtiiformis (Freyer, 1836)

Synonyms
- Sesia schmidtiiformis Freyer, 1836; Sesia schmidtii Lederer, 1853 (nec Zeller, 1847); Sesia schmidtellaeformis Freyer, 1836; Sesia schmidtiiformis ab. albotarsata Rebel, 1901; Pyropteron schmidtiiformis ab. pouloti Le Cerf, 1922; Sesia rubriformis Herrich-Schäffer, 1846; Sesia prosopiformis Herrich-Schäffer, 1846 (nec Ochsenheimer, 1808)

Species of moth

Chamaesphecia schmidtiiformis is a moth of the family Sesiidae. It is found in Italy, the Balkan Peninsula and Ukraine. It is also found from Turkey to the Black Sea coast, the Caucasus, Turkmenistan and Iran.

The wingspan is 17–26 mm.

The larvae feed on Salvia verticillata, Salvia sclarea and Salvia syriaca.
