= Chamaesphecia proximata =

Scientific classification
- Kingdom: Animalia
- Phylum: Arthropoda
- Clade: Pancrustacea
- Class: Insecta
- Order: Lepidoptera
- Family: Sesiidae
- Genus: Chamaesphecia
- Subgenus: Scopulosphecia
- Species: C. proximata

Binomial name
- Chamaesphecia proximata (Staudinger, 1891)

Synonyms
- Sesia proximata Staudinger, 1891; Sesia moreaui Le Cerf, 1911; Sesia gravesi Rebel, 1927

Species of moth

Chamaesphecia proximata is a moth of the family Sesiidae. It is found in Serbia and Montenegro, Bulgaria, the Republic of Macedonia, Albania, Greece, Cyprus, Asia Minor, Armenia, Lebanon and Iraq.

The larvae feed on Salvia sclarea.
