= Vulcaniella extremella =

Scientific classification
- Kingdom: Animalia
- Phylum: Arthropoda
- Clade: Pancrustacea
- Class: Insecta
- Order: Lepidoptera
- Family: Cosmopterigidae
- Genus: Vulcaniella
- Species: V. extremella

Binomial name
- Vulcaniella extremella (Wocke, 1871)

Synonyms
- Stagmatophora extremella Wocke, 1871; Stagmatophora buhri Hering, 1935; Stagmatophora naviella Chretien, 1907

Species of moth

Vulcaniella extremella is a moth of the family Cosmopterigidae. It is found from Poland to the Iberian Peninsula, Italy, and Bulgaria and from France to central and southern Russia.

The wingspan is 8–11 mm. Adults have been recorded from mid-May to mid-September.

The larvae feed on Salvia austriaca, Salvia nemorosa tesquicola and Salvia pratensis. They mine the leaves of their host plant.
