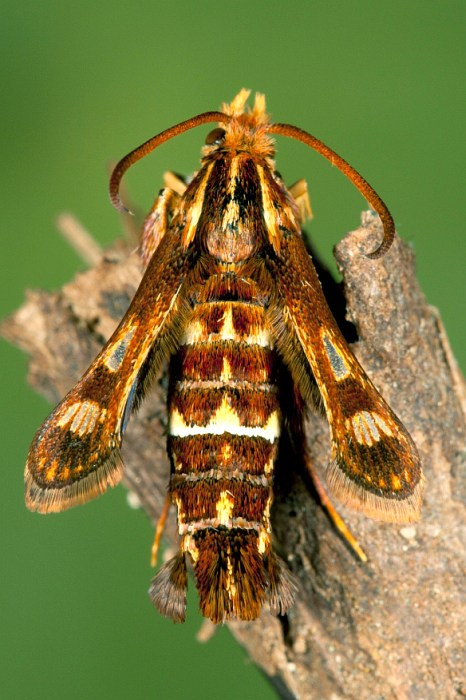
- A female moth on a tree

Scientific classification
- Kingdom: Animalia
- Phylum: Arthropoda
- Clade: Pancrustacea
- Class: Insecta
- Order: Lepidoptera
- Family: Sesiidae
- Genus: Chamaesphecia
- Subgenus: Scopulosphecia
- Species: C. osmiaeformis

Binomial name
- Chamaesphecia osmiaeformis (Herrich-Schaffer, 1848)

Synonyms
- Sesia osmiaeformis Herrich-Schaffer, 1848; Sesia osmiiformis Staudinger, 1856; Sesia zelleri Lederer, 1853; Sesia floricola Oberthür, 1881; Sesia agnes Oberthür, 1890; Sesia stelidiformis Zeller, 1847 (nec Freyer, 1836)

= Chamaesphecia osmiaeformis =

Species of moth

Chamaesphecia osmiaeformis is a moth of the family Sesiidae. It is found in Italy and Spain and on Corsica, Sardinia and Sicily, as well as in North Africa, including Morocco, Algeria, Tunisia, and possibly Egypt.

The larvae feed on Euphorbia polychroma.
