= Chamaesphecia euceraeformis =

Scientific classification
- Kingdom: Animalia
- Phylum: Arthropoda
- Clade: Pancrustacea
- Class: Insecta
- Order: Lepidoptera
- Family: Sesiidae
- Genus: Chamaesphecia
- Subgenus: Chamaesphecia
- Species: C. euceraeformis

Binomial name
- Chamaesphecia euceraeformis (Ochsenheimer, 1816)

Synonyms
- Sesia euceraeformis Ochsenheimer, 1816; Sesia euceriformis Staudinger, 1856; Sesia stelidiformis Freyer, 1836; Sesia unicincta Herrich-Schäffer, 1851 (nec Hampson, [1893]); Sesia herrichii Staudinger, 1856; Sesia misoleptiformis Herrich-Schäffer, 1846; Sesia icteropus Herrich-Schäffer, 1852 (nec Zeller, 1847)

Species of moth

Chamaesphecia euceraeformis is a moth of the family Sesiidae. It is found from Spain and France through Italy and south-eastern Europe to the Caucasus.

The wingspan is 17–24 mm. Adults are in wing from May to July in one generation per year.

The larvae feed on Euphorbia epithymoides. They spend one to two years in the root of their host plant.
