= Chamaesphecia minor =

Scientific classification
- Kingdom: Animalia
- Phylum: Arthropoda
- Clade: Pancrustacea
- Class: Insecta
- Order: Lepidoptera
- Family: Sesiidae
- Genus: Chamaesphecia
- Subgenus: Scopulosphecia
- Species: C. minor

Binomial name
- Chamaesphecia minor (Staudinger, 1856)

Synonyms
- Sesia minor Staudinger, 1856

Species of moth

Chamaesphecia minor is a moth of the family Sesiidae. It is found on Cyprus and in Turkey.
