= Chamaesphecia astatiformis =

Scientific classification
- Kingdom: Animalia
- Phylum: Arthropoda
- Clade: Pancrustacea
- Class: Insecta
- Order: Lepidoptera
- Family: Sesiidae
- Genus: Chamaesphecia
- Subgenus: Chamaesphecia
- Species: C. astatiformis

Binomial name
- Chamaesphecia astatiformis (Herrich-Schaffer, 1846)

Synonyms
- Sesia astatiformis Herrich-Schaffer, 1846; Sesia thyreiformis Herrich-Schäffer, 1846; Aegeria agathiformis Walker, 1856

Species of moth

Chamaesphecia astatiformis is a moth of the family Sesiidae. It is found from the Czech Republic, Austria, Slovenia and the Balkan Peninsula, east to Russia, northern Turkey, Kazakhstan, the Altai and Uzbekistan.

The wingspan is about 17 mm.

The larvae feed on Euphorbia esula and Euphorbia salicifolia.
