= Chamaesphecia minoica =

Scientific classification
- Kingdom: Animalia
- Phylum: Arthropoda
- Clade: Pancrustacea
- Class: Insecta
- Order: Lepidoptera
- Family: Sesiidae
- Genus: Chamaesphecia
- Subgenus: Scopulosphecia
- Species: C. minoica

Binomial name
- Chamaesphecia minoica Bartsch & Puhringer, 2005

Species of moth

Chamaesphecia minoica is a moth of the family Sesiidae. It is found on Crete.
