= Chamaesphecia alysoniformis =

Scientific classification
- Kingdom: Animalia
- Phylum: Arthropoda
- Clade: Pancrustacea
- Class: Insecta
- Order: Lepidoptera
- Family: Sesiidae
- Genus: Chamaesphecia
- Species: C. alysoniformis

Binomial name
- Chamaesphecia alysoniformis (Herrich-Schaffer, 1846)

Synonyms
- Sesia alysoniformis Herrich-Schaffer, 1846; Sesia trivittata Zeller, 1847; Sesia alysaeformis Herrich-Schäffer, 1846

Species of moth

Chamaesphecia alysoniformis is a moth of the family Sesiidae. It is found on the Balkan Peninsula, Cyprus, Crete, and in Turkey.

The larvae feed on Mentha longifolia, Mentha spicata, and Mentha pulegium.
