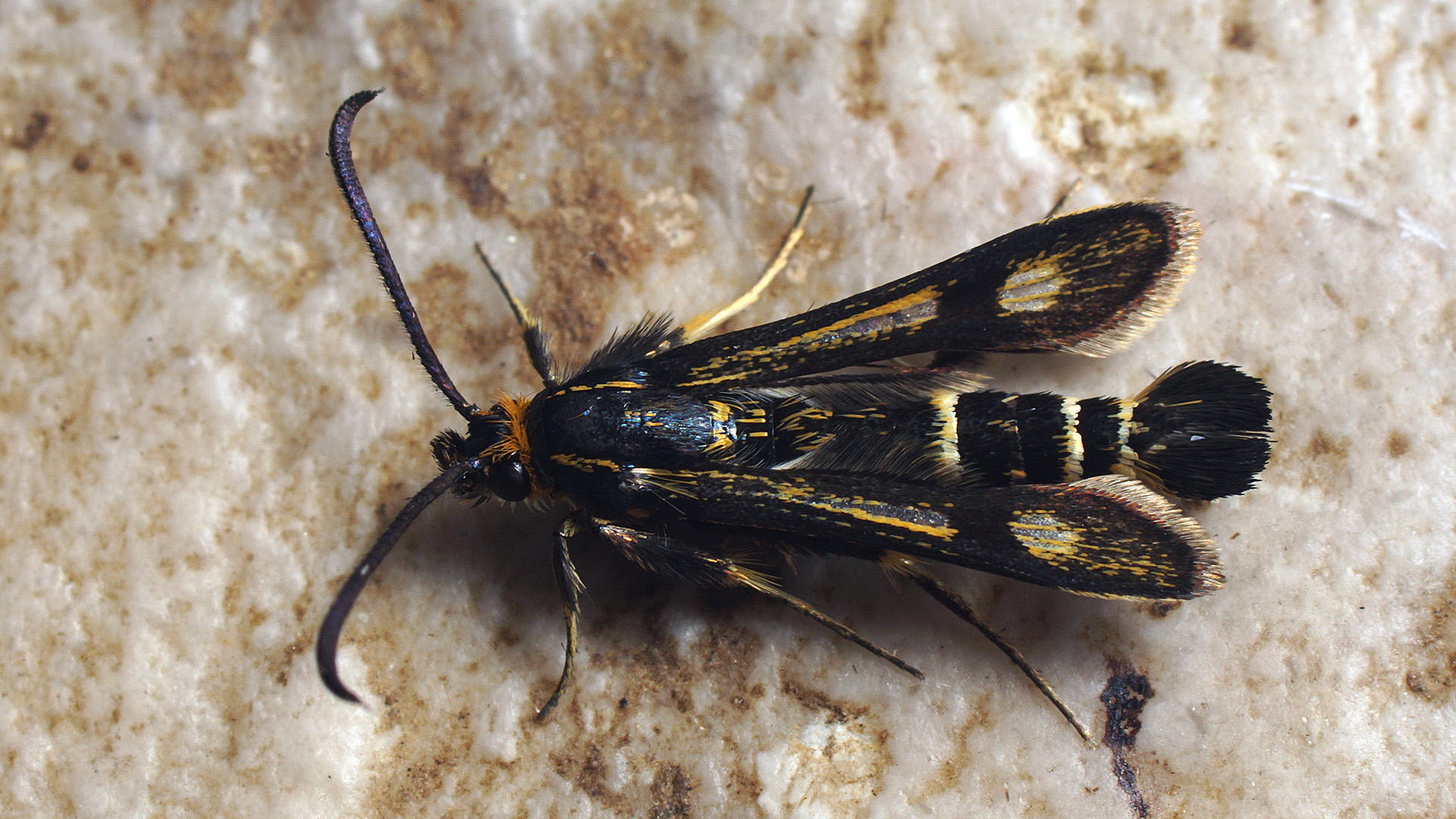

Scientific classification
- Kingdom: Animalia
- Phylum: Arthropoda
- Clade: Pancrustacea
- Class: Insecta
- Order: Lepidoptera
- Family: Sesiidae
- Genus: Chamaesphecia
- Subgenus: Chamaesphecia
- Species: C. nigrifrons

Binomial name
- Chamaesphecia nigrifrons (Le Cerf, 1911)

Synonyms
- Sesia nigrifrons Le Cerf, 1911; Chamaesphecia sevenari Lipthay, 1961; Chamaesphecia nigrifrons ab. schmidti Lipthay, 1961

= Chamaesphecia nigrifrons =

Species of moth

Chamaesphecia nigrifrons is a moth of the family Sesiidae. It is found in central and south-eastern France, Corsica, Luxembourg, South Belgium, south-western Germany, Austria, south-eastern Czech Republic, eastern Slovakia, Hungary, Croatia, Slovenia, former Yugoslavia, Serbia, southern Republic of Macedonia, Bosnia and Herzegovina, Bulgaria, northern Romania, northern Greece, southern Ukraine (the Crimea), Transcaucasia, north-western and southern Turkey and north-western Syria.

The wingspan is 9–18 mm. The hindwings have black veins, a broad discal spot and black margins.

The larvae feed on Hypericum perforatum.
