= Chamaesphecia gorbunovi =

Scientific classification
- Kingdom: Animalia
- Phylum: Arthropoda
- Clade: Pancrustacea
- Class: Insecta
- Order: Lepidoptera
- Family: Sesiidae
- Genus: Chamaesphecia
- Subgenus: Scopulosphecia
- Species: C. gorbunovi

Binomial name
- Chamaesphecia gorbunovi Špatenka, 1992

Species of moth

Chamaesphecia gorbunovi is a moth of the family Sesiidae. It is found in Greece, Turkey, Azerbaijan and Armenia.

The larvae feed on Scutellaria species.
