= Chamaesphecia ruficoronata =

Scientific classification
- Kingdom: Animalia
- Phylum: Arthropoda
- Clade: Pancrustacea
- Class: Insecta
- Order: Lepidoptera
- Family: Sesiidae
- Genus: Chamaesphecia
- Subgenus: Scopulosphecia
- Species: C. ruficoronata

Binomial name
- Chamaesphecia ruficoronata Kallies, Petersen & Riefenstahl, 1998

Species of moth

Chamaesphecia ruficoronata is a moth of the family Sesiidae. It is found in eastern Turkey.

Adults are almost completely black.

The larvae feed on Salvia species.
