= Chamaesphecia diabarensis =

Scientific classification
- Kingdom: Animalia
- Phylum: Arthropoda
- Clade: Pancrustacea
- Class: Insecta
- Order: Lepidoptera
- Family: Sesiidae
- Genus: Chamaesphecia
- Subgenus: Scopulosphecia
- Species: C. diabarensis

Binomial name
- Chamaesphecia diabarensis Gorbunov, 1987

Species of moth

Chamaesphecia diabarensis is a moth of the family Sesiidae. It is found in north-eastern Turkey, Azerbaijan and Armenia.

The larvae feed on Marrubium species.
