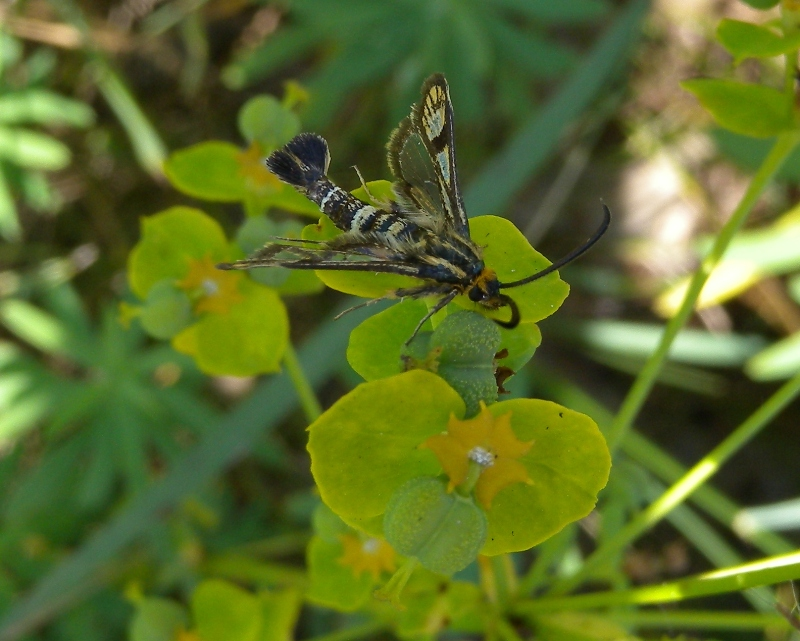

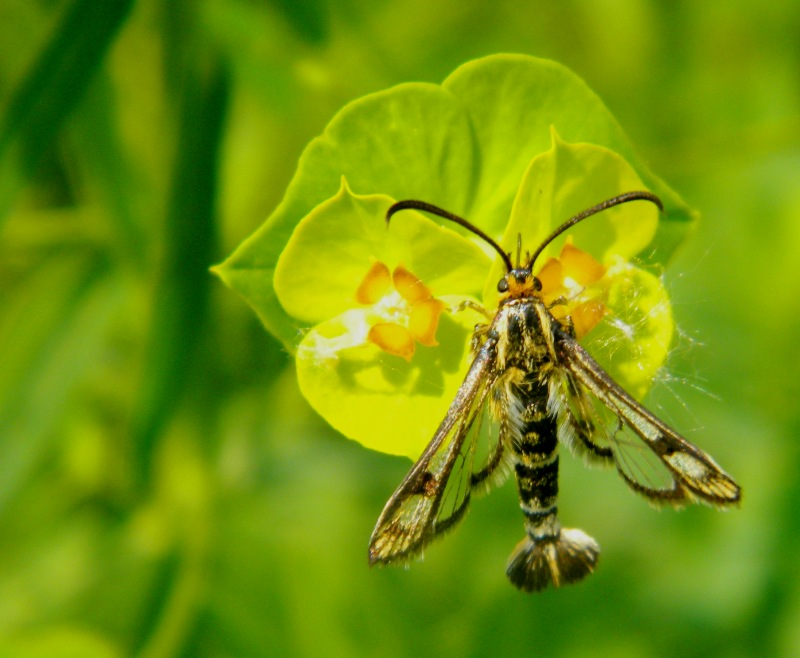

Scientific classification
- Kingdom: Animalia
- Phylum: Arthropoda
- Clade: Pancrustacea
- Class: Insecta
- Order: Lepidoptera
- Family: Sesiidae
- Genus: Chamaesphecia
- Subgenus: Chamaesphecia
- Species: C. tenthrediniformis

Binomial name
- Chamaesphecia tenthrediniformis (Denis & Schiffermüller, 1775)

Synonyms
- Sphinx tenthrediniformis [Denis & Schiffermüller], 1775; Sesia taediiformis Freyer, 1836

= Chamaesphecia tenthrediniformis =

Species of moth

Chamaesphecia tenthrediniformis is a moth of the family Sesiidae.

== Distribution ==
It is found in Europe and the Near East.

== Description ==
It strongly resembles Chamaesphecia empiformis, some sources classify both as one species. The length of the forewings is 6–10 mm. The moth flies from May to July depending on the location.

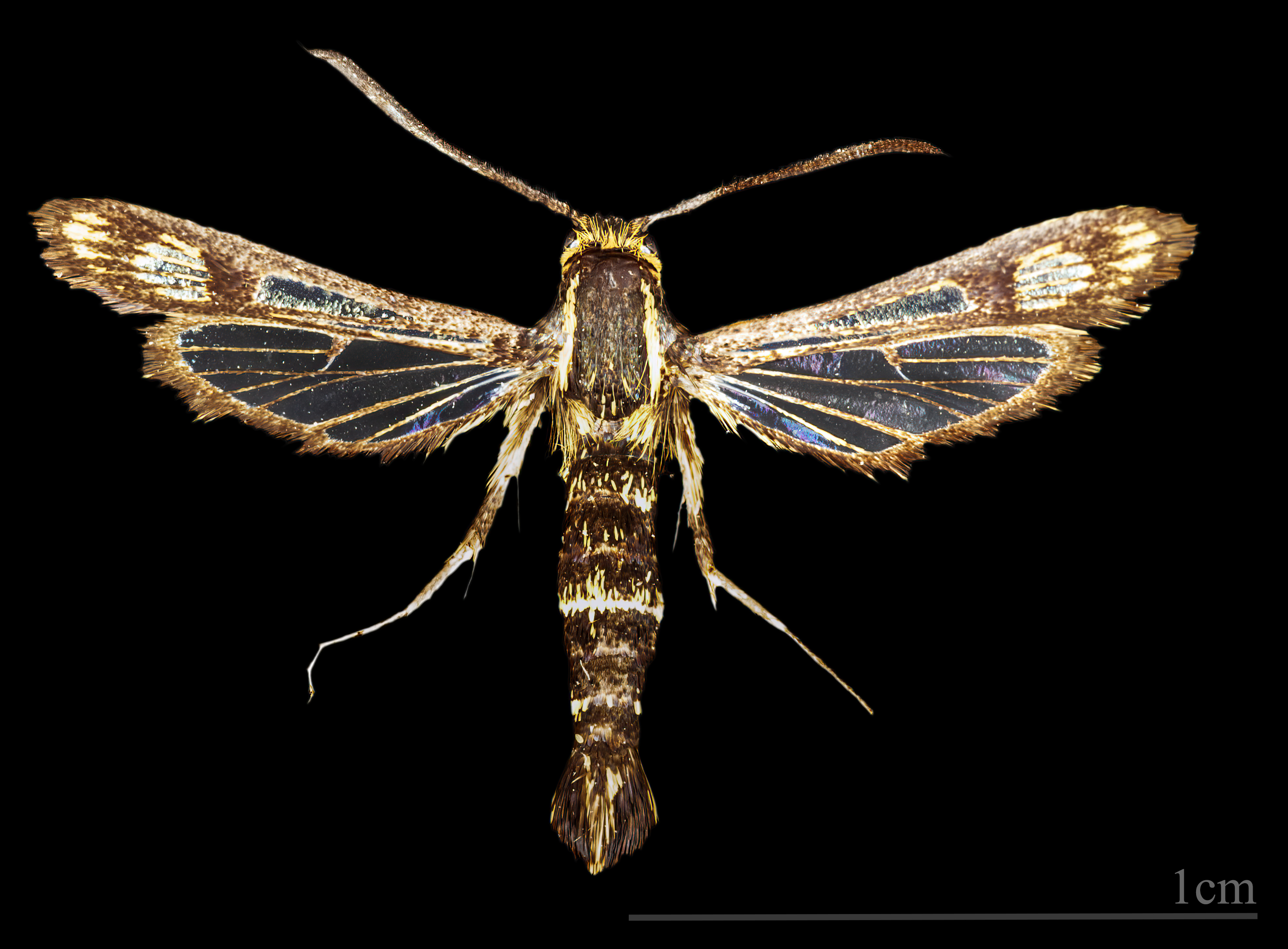
♂

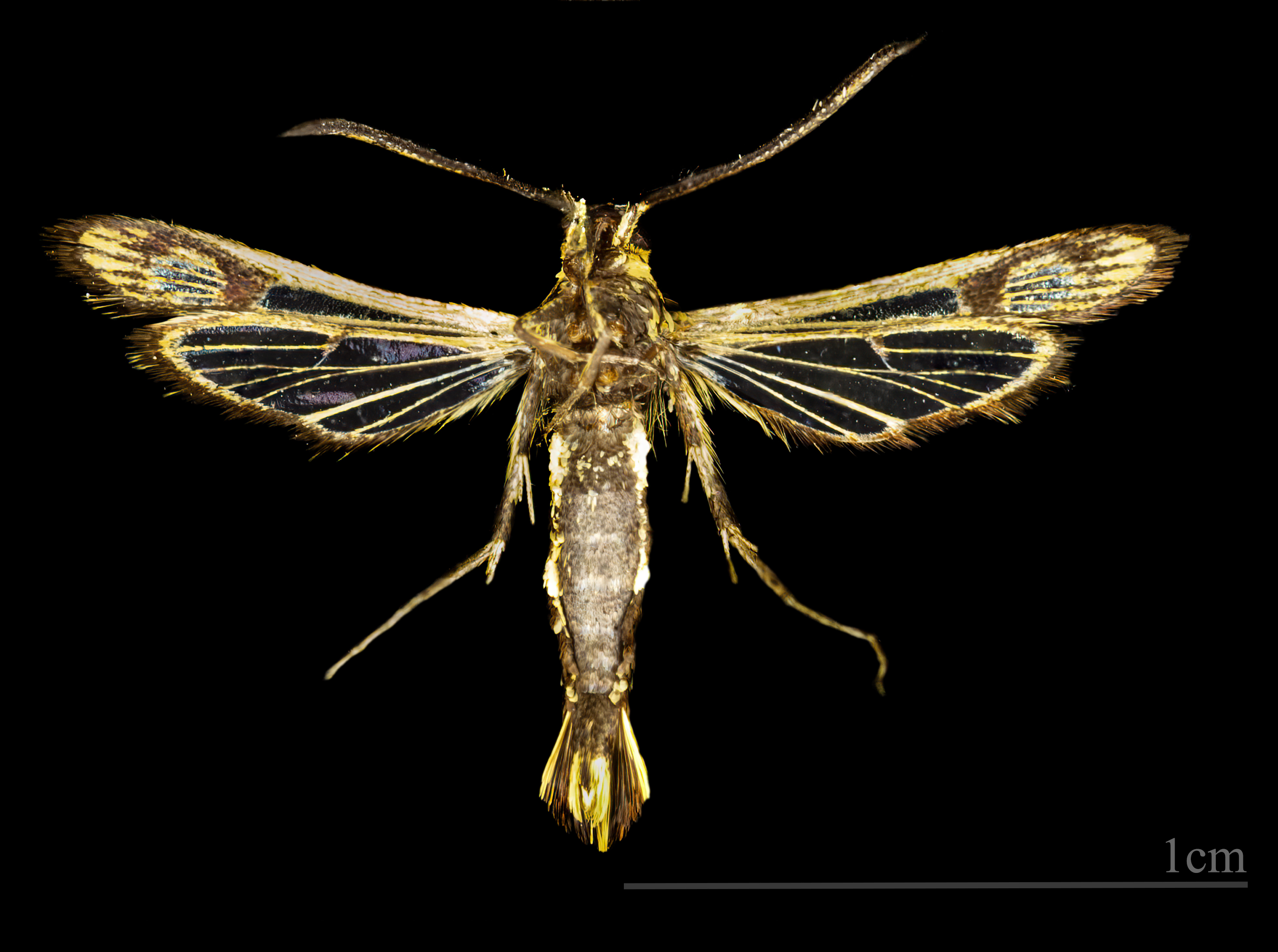
♂ △

== Biology ==
The larvae feed on Euphorbia esula.
