= Chamaesphecia ramburi =

Scientific classification
- Kingdom: Animalia
- Phylum: Arthropoda
- Clade: Pancrustacea
- Class: Insecta
- Order: Lepidoptera
- Family: Sesiidae
- Genus: Chamaesphecia
- Subgenus: Scopulosphecia
- Species: C. ramburi

Binomial name
- Chamaesphecia ramburi (Staudinger, 1866)

Synonyms
- Sesia ramburi Staudinger, 1866

Species of moth

Chamaesphecia ramburi is a moth of the family Sesiidae found in France, Spain and Portugal.

The larvae feed on Phlomis herbaventi and Phlomis lychnitis.
