= Chamaesphecia leucopsiformis =

Scientific classification
- Kingdom: Animalia
- Phylum: Arthropoda
- Clade: Pancrustacea
- Class: Insecta
- Order: Lepidoptera
- Family: Sesiidae
- Genus: Chamaesphecia
- Subgenus: Chamaesphecia
- Species: C. leucopsiformis

Binomial name
- Chamaesphecia leucopsiformis (Esper, 1800)

Synonyms
- Sphinx leucopsiformis Esper, 1800; Sesia foenusaeformis Heydenreich, 1851; Sesia alysaeformis Heydenreich, 1851; Sesia leucopsidiformis Lederer, 1853; Sesia leucospidiformis Staudinger, 1854

Species of moth

Chamaesphecia leucopsiformis is a moth of the family Sesiidae. It is found in most of Europe (except Ireland, Great Britain, the Benelux, Portugal, Denmark, Fennoscandia, the Baltic region and Greece) and Turkey.

The wingspan is 18–21 mm. Adults are in wing from August to September.

The larvae feed on Euphorbia cyparissias, Euphorbia esula and Euphorbia seguieriana.
