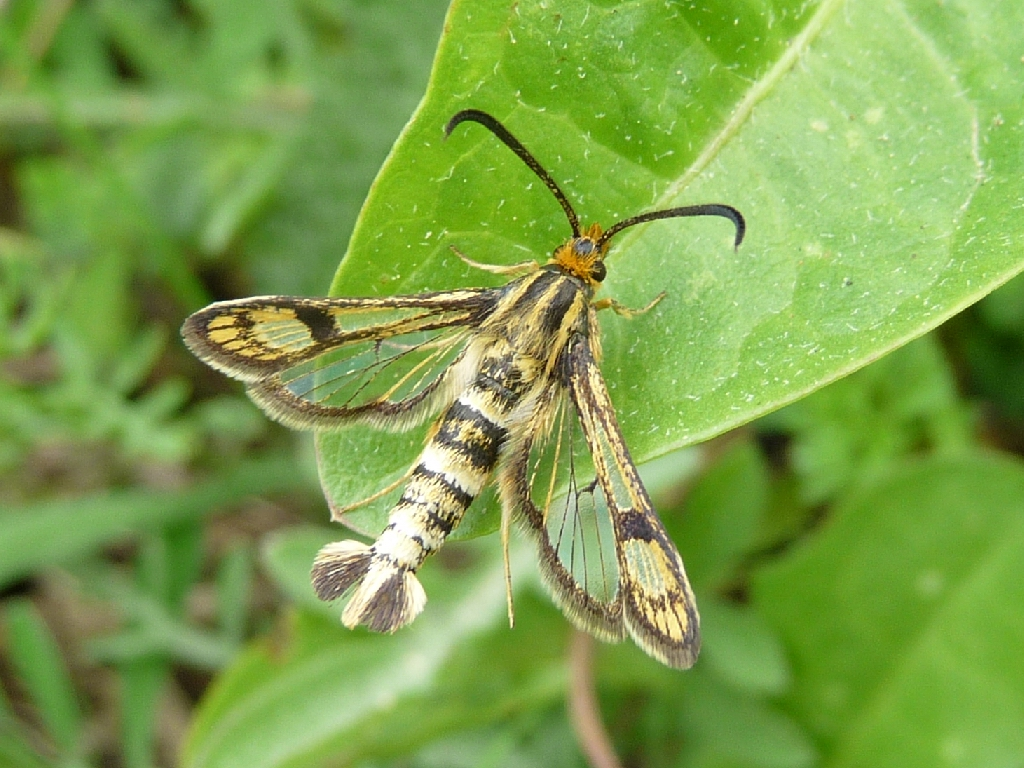
- Chamaesphecia empiformis

Scientific classification
- Kingdom: Animalia
- Phylum: Arthropoda
- Clade: Pancrustacea
- Class: Insecta
- Order: Lepidoptera
- Family: Sesiidae
- Subfamily: Sesiinae
- Tribe: Synanthedonini
- Genus: Chamaesphecia; Spuler, 1910

Species
- See text

= Chamaesphecia =

Genus of moths

Chamaesphecia is a genus of moths in the family Sesiidae.

== Species ==
- Subgenus Chamaesphecia Spuler, 1910
  - Chamaesphecia adelpha Le Cerf, 1938
  - Chamaesphecia amygdaloidis Schleppnik, 1933
  - Chamaesphecia anthracias Le Cerf, 1937
  - Chamaesphecia anthraciformis (Rambur, 1832)
  - Chamaesphecia astatiformis (Herrich-Schäffer, 1846)
  - Chamaesphecia bibioniformis (Esper, 1800)
  - Chamaesphecia crassicornis Bartel, 1912
  - Chamaesphecia cyanopasta (Hampson, 1910)
  - Chamaesphecia darvazica Gorbunov, 2001
  - Chamaesphecia emba Gorbunov, 2001
  - Chamaesphecia empiformis (Esper, 1783)
  - Chamaesphecia euceraeformis (Ochsenheimer, 1816)
  - Chamaesphecia guriensis (Emich von Emöke, 1872)
  - Chamaesphecia hungarica (Tomala, 1901)
  - Chamaesphecia iranica Le Cerf, 1937
  - Chamaesphecia kautti Špatenka, 1997
  - Chamaesphecia keili Kallies & Špatenka, 2003
  - Chamaesphecia kistenjovi Gorbunov, 1991a
  - Chamaesphecia leucocnemis Le Cerf, 1938
  - Chamaesphecia leucopsiformis (Esper, 1800)
  - Chamaesphecia mezentzevi Gorbunov, 1989
  - Chamaesphecia murzini Gorbunov, 2001
  - Chamaesphecia mutilata (Staudinger, 1887)
  - Chamaesphecia nigrifrons (Le Cerf, 1911)
  - Chamaesphecia palustris Kautz, 1927
  - Chamaesphecia schizoceriformis (Kolenati, 1846)
  - Chamaesphecia schroederi Toševski, 1993b
  - Chamaesphecia sogdianica Špatenka, 1987
  - Chamaesphecia taurica Špatenka, 1997
  - Chamaesphecia tenthrediniformis ([Denis & Schiffermüller], 1775)
  - Chamaesphecia thomyris Le Cerf, 1938
  - Chamaesphecia turbida Le Cerf, 1937
  - Chamaesphecia uilica Gorbunov, 2001

- Subgenus Scopulosphecia Laštuvka, [1990]
  - Chamaesphecia aerifrons (Zeller, 1847b:415)
    - Chamaesphecia aerifrons aerifrons (Zeller, 1847)
    - Chamaesphecia aerifrons sardoa (Staudinger, 1856:281)
  - Chamaesphecia albida Špatenka, 1999:365
  - Chamaesphecia albiventris (Lederer, 1853)
  - Chamaesphecia alysoniformis (Herrich-Schäffer, 1846)
  - Chamaesphecia anatolica Schwingenschuss, 1938
  - Chamaesphecia annellata (Zeller, 1847)
  - Chamaesphecia aurifera (Romanoff, 1885)
  - Chamaesphecia azonos (Lederer, 1855)
  - Chamaesphecia blandita Gorbunov & Špatenka, 2001
  - Chamaesphecia chalciformis (Esper, [1804])
  - Chamaesphecia christophi Gorbunov & Špatenka, 2001
  - Chamaesphecia chrysoneura Püngeler, 1912
    - Chamaesphecia chrysoneura chrysoneura Püngeler, 1912
    - Chamaesphecia chrysoneura melanophleps Zukowsky, 1935
  - Chamaesphecia diabarensis Gorbunov, 1987b:14
  - Chamaesphecia doleriformis (Herrich-Schäffer, 1846)
    - Chamaesphecia doleriformis doleriformis (Herrich-Schäffer, 1846)
    - Chamaesphecia doleriformis colpiformis (Staudinger, 1856)
  - Chamaesphecia doryceraeformis (Lederer, 1853)
  - Chamaesphecia dumonti Le Cerf, 1922
  - Chamaesphecia elampiformis (Herrich-Schäffer, 1851)
    - Chamaesphecia elampiformis elampiformis (Herrich-Schäffer, 1851)
    - Chamaesphecia elampiformis mandana (Le Cerf, 1938)
  - Chamaesphecia ferganae Sheljuzhko, 1924
  - Chamaesphecia festai Turati, 1925
  - Chamaesphecia fredi Le Cerf, 1938
  - Chamaesphecia gorbunovi Špatenka, 1992
  - Chamaesphecia guenter Herrmann & Hofmann, 1997
  - Chamaesphecia haberhaueri (Staudinger, 1879)
  - Chamaesphecia inexpectata (Le Cerf, 1938)
  - Chamaesphecia infernalis Sheljuzhko, 1935
  - Chamaesphecia jitkae Špatenka, 1987
  - Chamaesphecia leucoparea (Lederer, 1872)
  - Chamaesphecia margiana Püngeler, 1912
  - Chamaesphecia masariformis (Ochsenheimer, 1808)
    - Chamaesphecia masariformis masariformis (Ochsenheimer, 1808)
    - Chamaesphecia masariformis odyneriformis (Herrich-Schäffer, 1846)
  - Chamaesphecia maurusia Püngeler, 1912
  - Chamaesphecia minoica Bartsch & Pühringer, 2005
  - Chamaesphecia minor (Staudinger, 1856)
  - Chamaesphecia mirza Le Cerf, 1938
  - Chamaesphecia morosa Le Cerf, 1937
  - Chamaesphecia mudjahida Špatenka, 1997
  - Chamaesphecia mysiniformis (Boisduval, 1840)
  - Chamaesphecia obraztsovi Sheljuzhko, 1943
    - Chamaesphecia obraztsovi obraztsovi Sheljuzhko, 1943
    - Chamaesphecia obraztsovi obermajeri Špatenka, 1992
  - Chamaesphecia ophimontana Gorbunov, 1991
  - Chamaesphecia osmiaeformis (Herrich-Schäffer, 1848
  - Chamaesphecia oxybeliformis (Herrich-Schäffer, 1846)
  - Chamaesphecia pechi (Staudinger, 1887)
  - Chamaesphecia proximata (Staudinger, 1891)
  - Chamaesphecia purpurea Spatenka & Kallies, 2006
  - Chamaesphecia ramburi (Staudinger, 1866)
  - Chamaesphecia regula (Staudinger, 1891)
  - Chamaesphecia ruficoronata Kallies, Petersen & Riefenstahl, 1998
  - Chamaesphecia schmidtiiformis (Freyer, 1836)
  - Chamaesphecia schwingenschussi (Le Cerf, 1937)
  - Chamaesphecia sefid Le Cerf, 1938
  - Chamaesphecia sertavulensis Gorbunov & Špatenka, 2001
  - Chamaesphecia staudingeri (Failla-Tedaldi, 1890)
  - Chamaesphecia tahira Kallies & Petersen, 1995
  - Chamaesphecia thracica Laštuvka, 1983
  - Chamaesphecia weidenhofferi Špatenka, 1997
  - Chamaesphecia xantho Le Cerf, 1937
  - Chamaesphecia xanthosticta (Hampson, [1893])
  - Chamaesphecia xanthotrigona Bartsch & Kallies, 2008
  - Chamaesphecia zarathustra Gorbunov & Špatenka, 1992
  - Chamaesphecia zimmermannii (Lederer, 1872)
- Incertae sedis
  - Chamaesphecia atramentaria Zukowsky, 1950
  - Chamaesphecia aurata (Edwards, 1881)
  - Chamaesphecia borsanii Köhler, 1953
  - Chamaesphecia breyeri Köhler, 1941
  - Chamaesphecia penthetria Zukowsky, 1936
  - Chamaesphecia pluto Zukowsky, 1936
  - Chamaesphecia andrianony Viette, 1982
  - Chamaesphecia clathrata Le Cerf, 1917
  - Chamaesphecia lemur Le Cerf, 1957
  - Chamaesphecia seyrigi Le Cerf, 1957
  - Chamaesphecia tritonias Hampson, 1919
