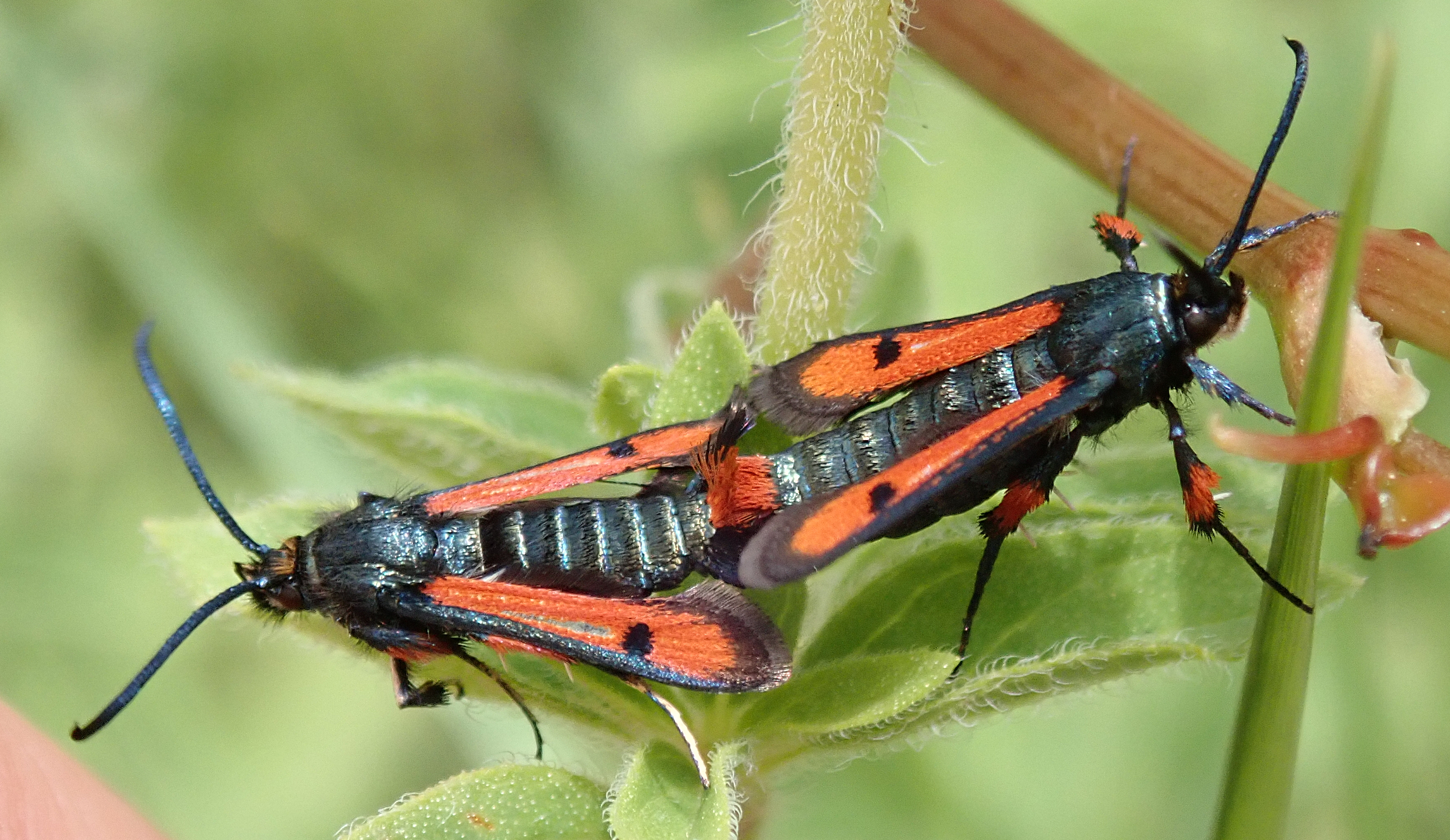
- couple of Chamaesphecia chalciformis from Greece, Peleponnesos

Scientific classification
- Kingdom: Animalia
- Phylum: Arthropoda
- Clade: Pancrustacea
- Class: Insecta
- Order: Lepidoptera
- Family: Sesiidae
- Genus: Chamaesphecia
- Species: C. chalciformis

Binomial name
- Chamaesphecia chalciformis (Esper, 1804)

Synonyms
- Sphinx chalciformis Esper, 1804; Sphinx chalcidiformis Hübner, [1806]; Sesia prosopiformis Ochsenheimer, 1808; Sesia halictiformis Herrich-Schäffer, 1846; Sesia chalciformis f. caucasica Kolenati, 1846; Sesia chalciformis var. expleta Staudinger, 1879

= Chamaesphecia chalciformis =

Species of moth

Chamaesphecia chalciformis is a moth of the family Sesiidae. It is found in Italy, Austria, Slovakia, the Balkan Peninsula, Ukraine, Russia, Turkey, the Middle East and northern Iran.

The larvae feed on Origanum vulgare.
