= Chamaesphecia clathrata =

Scientific classification
- Kingdom: Animalia
- Phylum: Arthropoda
- Clade: Pancrustacea
- Class: Insecta
- Order: Lepidoptera
- Family: Sesiidae
- Genus: Chamaesphecia
- Species: C. clathrata

Binomial name
- Chamaesphecia clathrata Le Cerf, 1917

Species of moth

Chamaesphecia clathrata is a moth of the family Sesiidae. It is known from the Democratic Republic of the Congo.
