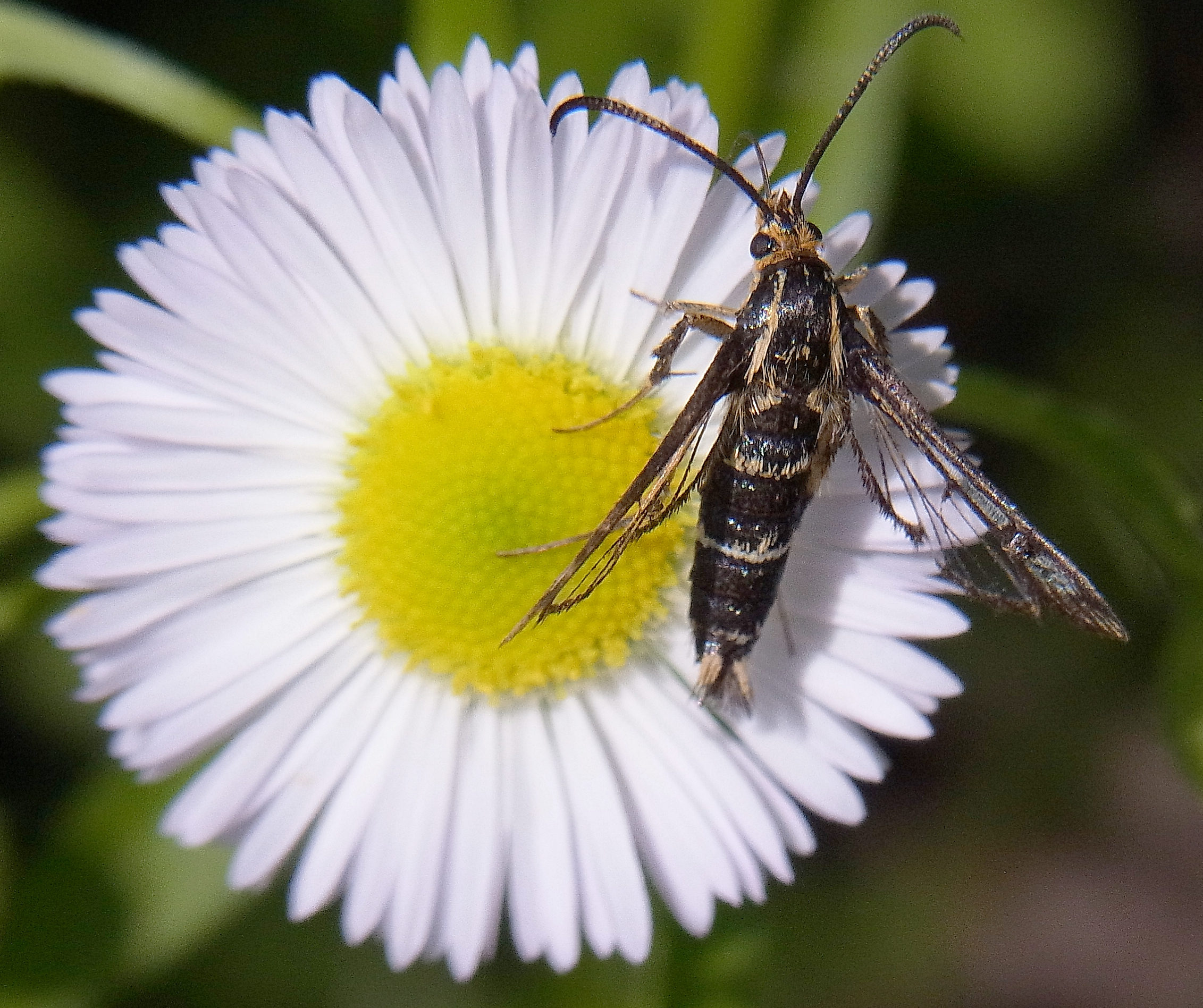
- Chamaesphecia annellata, female

Scientific classification
- Kingdom: Animalia
- Phylum: Arthropoda
- Clade: Pancrustacea
- Class: Insecta
- Order: Lepidoptera
- Family: Sesiidae
- Genus: Chamaesphecia
- Subgenus: Scopulosphecia
- Species: C. annellata

Binomial name
- Chamaesphecia annellata (Zeller, 1847)

Synonyms
- Sesia annellata Zeller, 1847; Sesia ceriaeformis Lederer, 1853 (nec Lucas, 1849); Sesia annellata var. ceriiformis Staudinger, 1856; Aegeria muscinaeformis Walker, 1856; Sesia minorata Staudinger, 1894; Chamaesphecia annellata f. ledereri Bartel, 1912; Chamaesphecia clermonti Le Cerf, 1914; Chamaesphecia asellana Heydenreich, 1851

= Chamaesphecia annellata =

Species of moth

Chamaesphecia annellata is a moth of the family Sesiidae. It is found from Germany and Poland south to Greece and Turkey and east to southern Russia and the Caucasus.

The wingspan is 14–17 mm. Adults are on wing from June to September.

The larvae feed on Ballota nigra.
