= Chamaesphecia oxybeliformis =

Scientific classification
- Kingdom: Animalia
- Phylum: Arthropoda
- Clade: Pancrustacea
- Class: Insecta
- Order: Lepidoptera
- Family: Sesiidae
- Genus: Chamaesphecia
- Subgenus: Scopulosphecia
- Species: C. oxybeliformis

Binomial name
- Chamaesphecia oxybeliformis (Herrich-Schaffer, 1846)

Synonyms
- Sesia oxybeliformis Herrich-Schaffer, 1846

Species of moth

Chamaesphecia oxybeliformis is a moth of the family Sesiidae. It is found in the Balkans (Greece, Macedonia, Bulgaria, Romania), Ukraine, southern Russia, and in West Asia (from Asia Minor to Armenia, and from the Caucasus to northern Iran).

The larvae feed on Marrubium peregrinum and Marrubium vulgare.
