= Chamaesphecia palustris =

Scientific classification
- Kingdom: Animalia
- Phylum: Arthropoda
- Clade: Pancrustacea
- Class: Insecta
- Order: Lepidoptera
- Family: Sesiidae
- Genus: Chamaesphecia
- Subgenus: Chamaesphecia
- Species: C. palustris

Binomial name
- Chamaesphecia palustris Kautz, 1927

Species of moth

Chamaesphecia palustris is a moth of the family Sesiidae. It is found in France, Italy, Austria, the Czech Republic, Slovakia, Hungary, Croatia, Serbia and Montenegro, Romania, Moldova, Ukraine, Russia and northern Turkey.

The wingspan is 25–29 mm.

The larvae feed on Euphorbia palustris and Euphorbia lucida.
