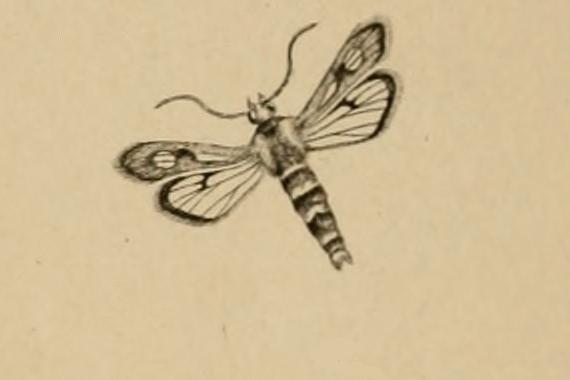

Scientific classification
- Kingdom: Animalia
- Phylum: Arthropoda
- Clade: Pancrustacea
- Class: Insecta
- Order: Lepidoptera
- Family: Sesiidae
- Genus: Chamaesphecia
- Subgenus: Scopulosphecia
- Species: C. staudingeri

Binomial name
- Chamaesphecia staudingeri (Failla-Tedaldi, 1890)

Synonyms
- Sesia staudingeri Failla-Tedaldi, 1890

= Chamaesphecia staudingeri =

Species of moth

Chamaesphecia staudingeri is a moth of the family Sesiidae. It is found on Sicily.
