= Chamaesphecia elampiformis =

Scientific classification
- Kingdom: Animalia
- Phylum: Arthropoda
- Clade: Pancrustacea
- Class: Insecta
- Order: Lepidoptera
- Family: Sesiidae
- Genus: Chamaesphecia
- Subgenus: Scopulosphecia
- Species: C. elampiformis

Binomial name
- Chamaesphecia elampiformis (Herrich-Schäffer, 1851)

Synonyms
- Sesia elampiformis Herrich-Schäffer, 1851 (nec Herrich-Schäffer, 1846); Pyropteron mandana Le Cerf, 1938

Species of moth

Chamaesphecia elampiformis is a moth of the family Sesiidae. It is found in Turkey and Transcaucasia.

The larvae probably feed on the roots of Stachys inflata.

== Subspecies ==
- Chamaesphecia elampiformis elampiformis (Turkey and Transcaucasia)
- Chamaesphecia elampiformis mandana (Le Cerf, 1938)
