= Chamaesphecia andrianony =

Scientific classification
- Kingdom: Animalia
- Phylum: Arthropoda
- Clade: Pancrustacea
- Class: Insecta
- Order: Lepidoptera
- Family: Sesiidae
- Genus: Chamaesphecia
- Species: C. andrianony

Binomial name
- Chamaesphecia andrianony Viette, 1982

Species of moth

Chamaesphecia andrianony is a moth of the family Sesiidae. It is known from Africa.
