= Chamaesphecia maurusia =

Scientific classification
- Kingdom: Animalia
- Phylum: Arthropoda
- Clade: Pancrustacea
- Class: Insecta
- Order: Lepidoptera
- Family: Sesiidae
- Genus: Chamaesphecia
- Subgenus: Scopulosphecia
- Species: C. maurusia

Binomial name
- Chamaesphecia maurusia Pungeler, 1912

Synonyms
- Chamaesphecia anthrax Le Cerf, 1916

Species of moth

Chamaesphecia maurusia is a moth of the family Sesiidae. It is found in Spain and Portugal and in Sicily, as well as in Algeria and Morocco.

The larvae feed on Marrubium species.
