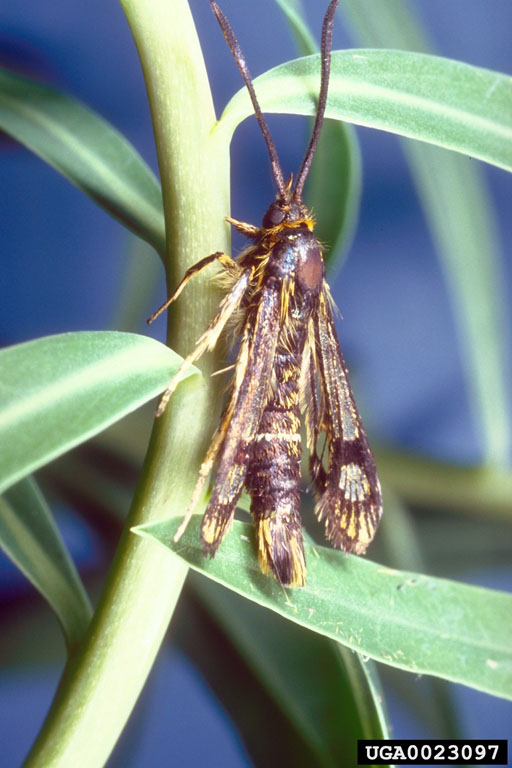

Scientific classification
- Kingdom: Animalia
- Phylum: Arthropoda
- Clade: Pancrustacea
- Class: Insecta
- Order: Lepidoptera
- Family: Sesiidae
- Genus: Chamaesphecia
- Subgenus: Chamaesphecia
- Species: C. hungarica

Binomial name
- Chamaesphecia hungarica (Tomala, 1901)

Synonyms
- Sesia hungarica Tomala, 1901; Chamaesphecia deltaica Popescu-Gorj & Capuse, 1965

= Chamaesphecia hungarica =

Species of moth

Chamaesphecia hungarica, the Hungarian clearwing moth, is a moth of the family Sesiidae. It is native to the south-eastern Czech Republic and Slovakia, Austria, Hungary, Serbia and Croatia. It was originally approved for introduction into the United States in 1993.
