= Chamaesphecia doryceraeformis =

Scientific classification
- Kingdom: Animalia
- Phylum: Arthropoda
- Clade: Pancrustacea
- Class: Insecta
- Order: Lepidoptera
- Family: Sesiidae
- Genus: Chamaesphecia
- Subgenus: Scopulosphecia
- Species: C. doryceraeformis

Binomial name
- Chamaesphecia doryceraeformis (Lederer, 1853)

Synonyms
- Sesia doryceraeformis Lederer, 1853; Sesia ortalidiformis Lederer, 1853

Species of moth

Chamaesphecia doryceraeformis is a moth of the family Sesiidae. It is found in Turkey, Iran and Transcaucasia.

Adult males have been observed feeding on flowers or resting on Astragalus plants.

The larvae feed on Phlomis capitata.
