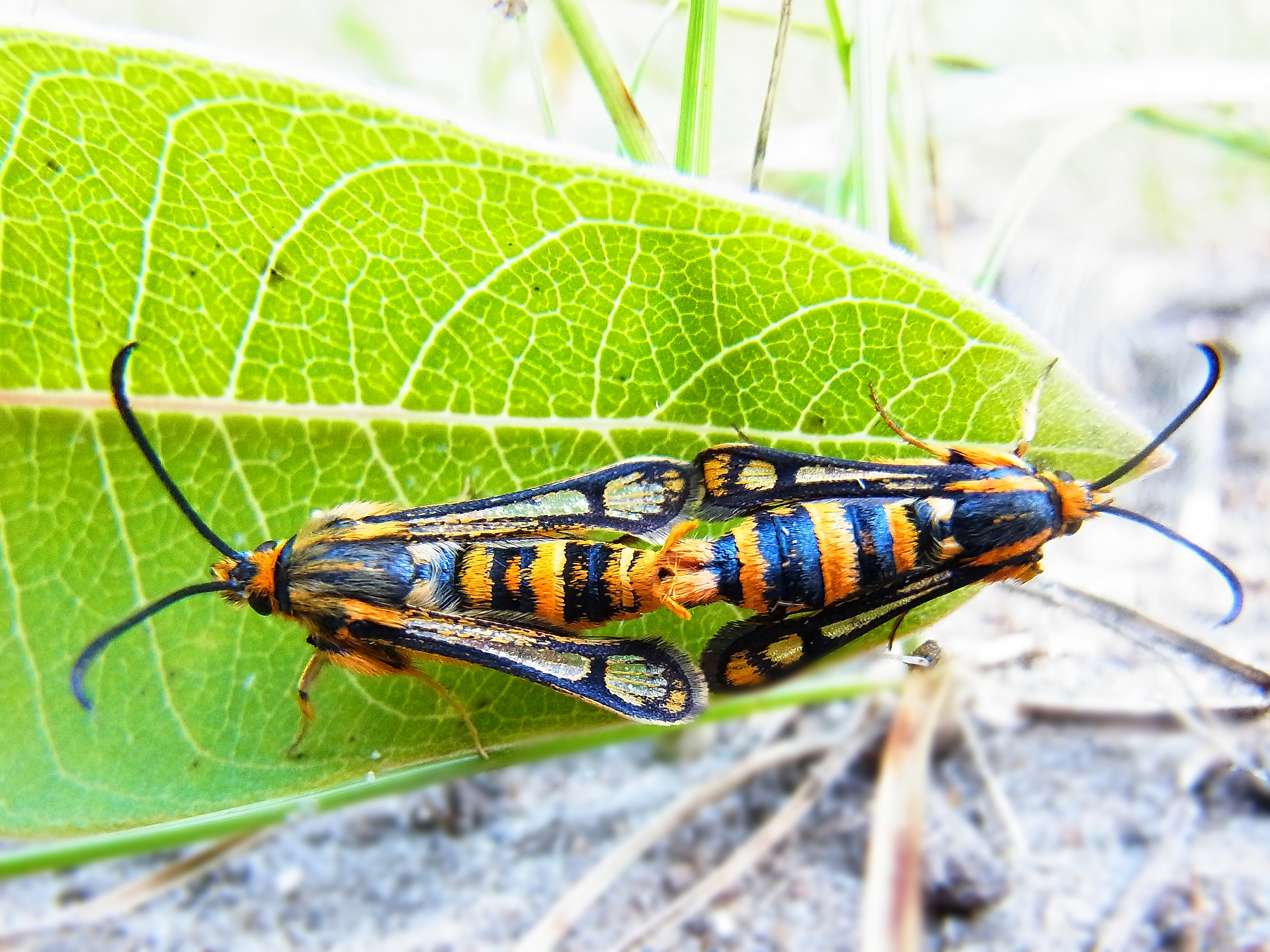

Scientific classification
- Kingdom: Animalia
- Phylum: Arthropoda
- Clade: Pancrustacea
- Class: Insecta
- Order: Lepidoptera
- Family: Sesiidae
- Genus: Chamaesphecia
- Subgenus: Scopulosphecia
- Species: C. masariformis

Binomial name
- Chamaesphecia masariformis (Ochsenheimer, 1808)

Synonyms
- Sesia masariformis Ochsenheimer, 1808; Sphinx banchiformis Hübner, [1808-1813]; Sesia allantiformis Eversmann, 1844; Sesia loewii Zeller, 1847; Chamaesphecia brandti Le Cerf, 1937; Chamaesphecia djakonovi Popescu-Gorj & Capuse, 1966; Sesia pompiliformis Heydenreich, 1851; Sphinx culiciformis Sulzer, 1776 (nec Linnaeus, 1758); Sesia odyneriformis Herrich-Schäffer, 1846; Sesia fallax Staudinger, 1891

= Chamaesphecia masariformis =

Species of moth

Chamaesphecia masariformis is a moth of the family Sesiidae. It is found in south-eastern Europe, Turkey, northern Iran, the Middle East, the Caucasus, southern Russia, Uzbekistan and Tajikistan.

The wingspan is 21–23 mm. Adults are on wing from May to July.

The larvae feed on Verbascum species (including Verbascum lychnites, Verbascum thapsus and Verbascum nigrum), Scrophularia canina and possibly Astragalus ponticus.

== Subspecies ==
- Chamaesphecia masariformis masariformis
- Chamaesphecia masariformis odyneriformis (Herrich-Schäffer, 1846)
