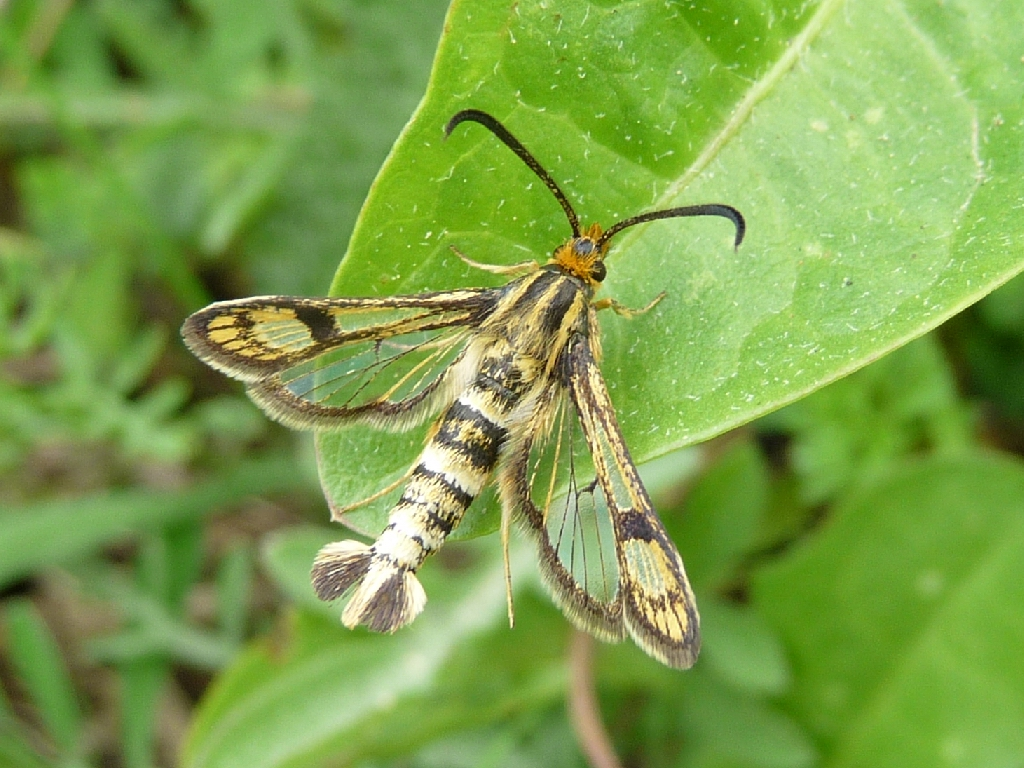

Scientific classification
- Kingdom: Animalia
- Phylum: Arthropoda
- Clade: Pancrustacea
- Class: Insecta
- Order: Lepidoptera
- Family: Sesiidae
- Genus: Chamaesphecia
- Subgenus: Chamaesphecia
- Species: C. empiformis

Binomial name
- Chamaesphecia empiformis (Esper, 1783)

Synonyms
- Sphinx empiformis Esper, 1783; Sphinx bombyciformis Geoffroy, 1785; Aegeria empinaeformis Walker, 1856; Chamaesphecia empiformis f. flavoabdominalis Popescu-Gorj, 1955; Chamaesphecia lastuvkai Špatenka, 1987; Sphinx muscaeformis Borkhausen, 1789 (nec Esper, 1783)

= Chamaesphecia empiformis =

Species of moth

Chamaesphecia empiformis is a moth of the family Sesiidae.

== Distribution ==
It is found in Europe.

== Description ==
It strongly resembles Chamaesphecia tenthrediniformis, some sources classify both as one species.

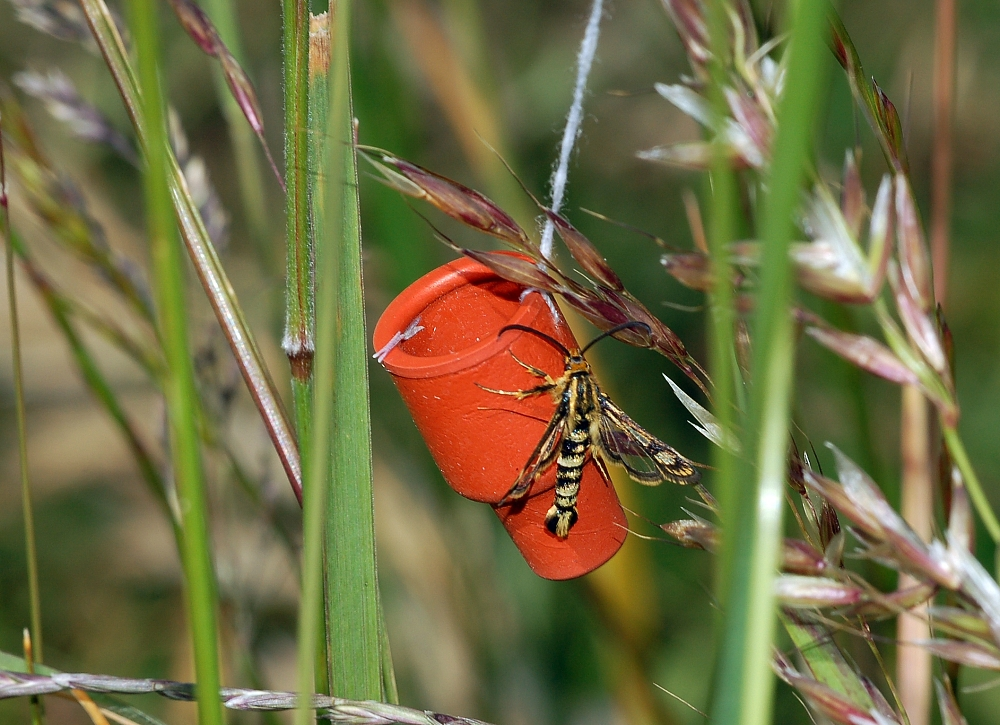
Chamaesphecia empiformis on a pheromone trap

The length of the forewings is 6–10 mm. The moth flies from May to August depending on the location.

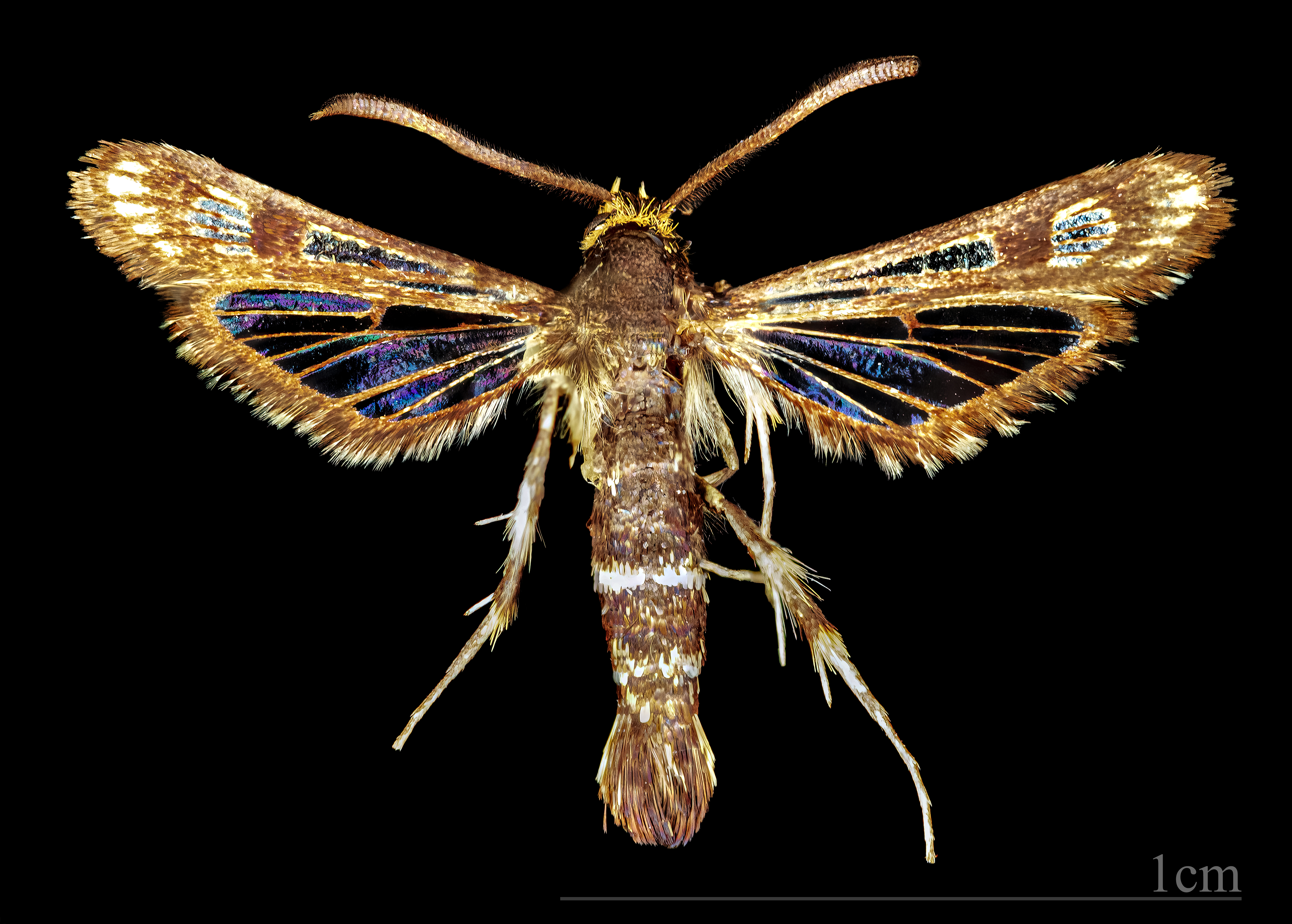
♂

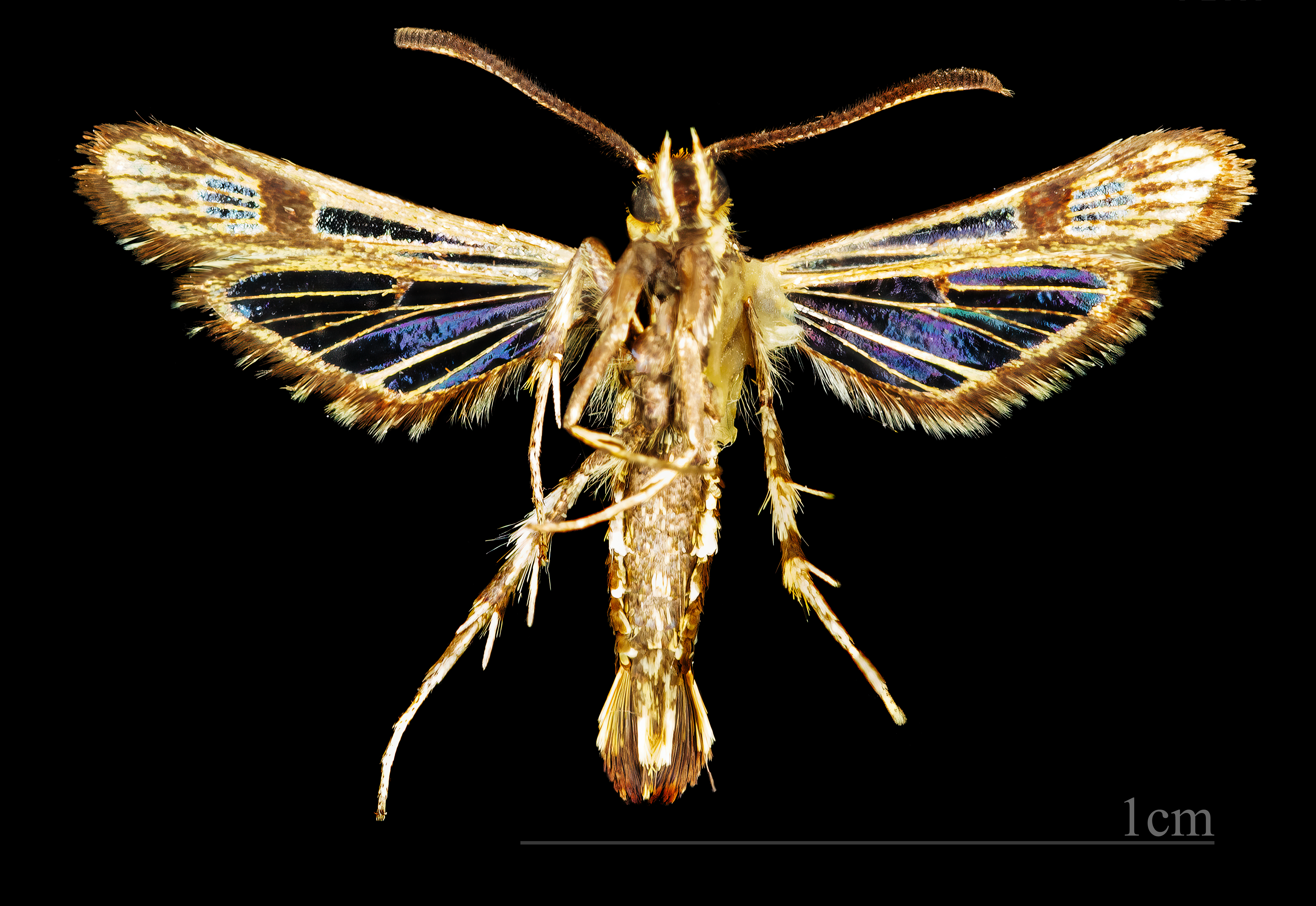
♂ △

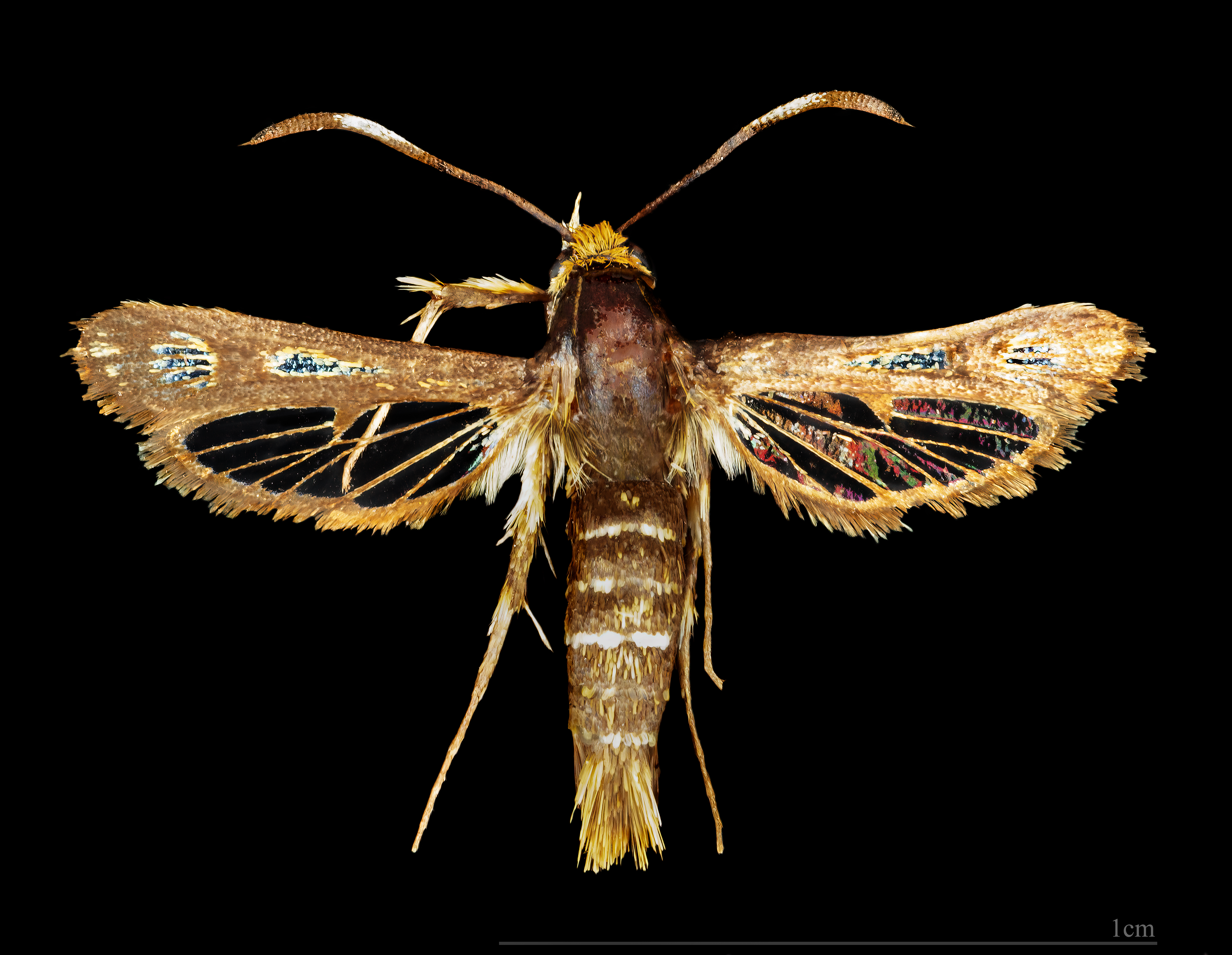
♀

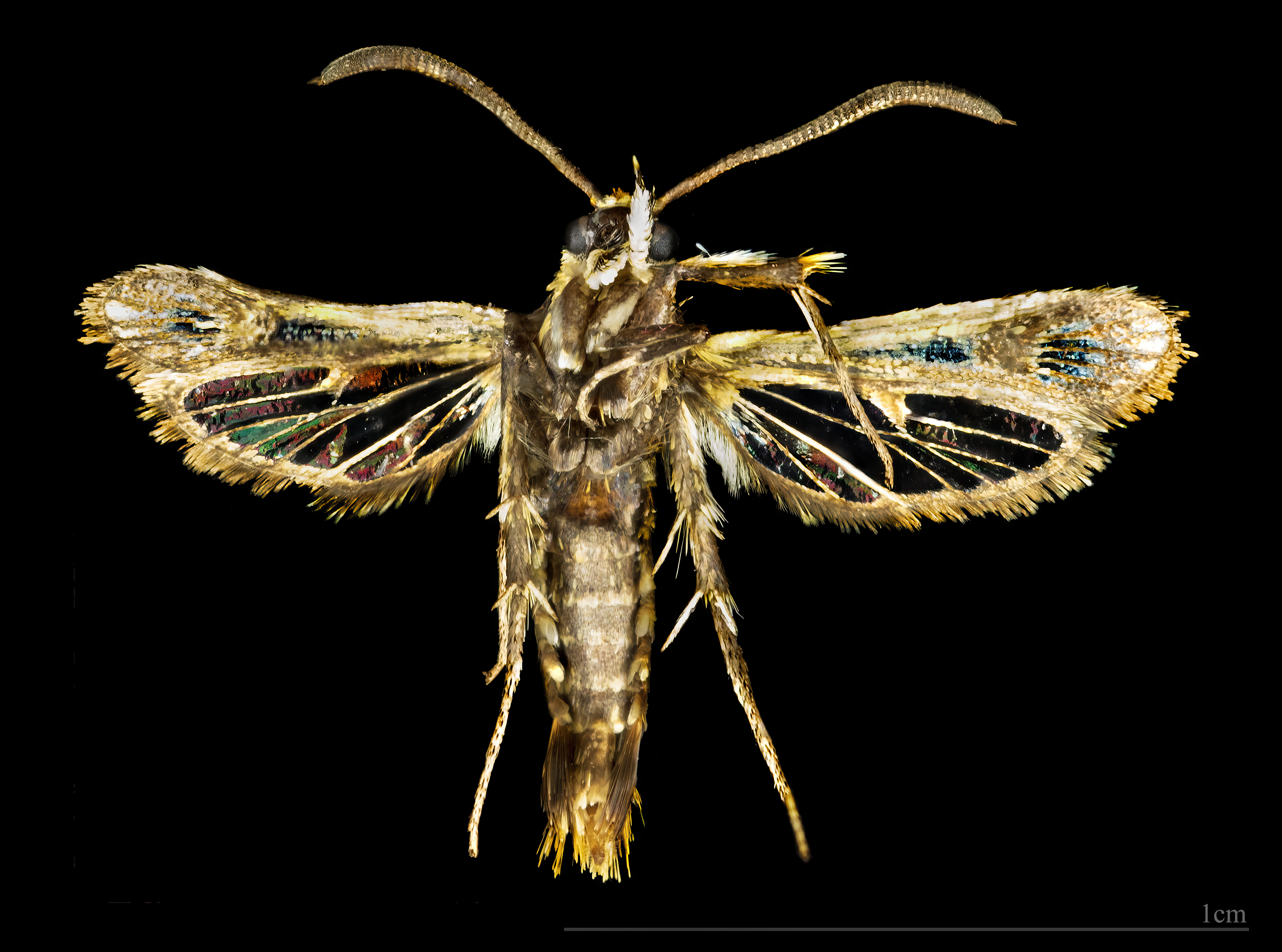
♀ △

== Biology ==
The larvae feed on cypress spurge.
