= Chamaesphecia aerifrons =

Scientific classification
- Kingdom: Animalia
- Phylum: Arthropoda
- Clade: Pancrustacea
- Class: Insecta
- Order: Lepidoptera
- Family: Sesiidae
- Genus: Chamaesphecia
- Subgenus: Scopulosphecia
- Species: C. aerifrons

Binomial name
- Chamaesphecia aerifrons (Zeller, 1847)

Synonyms
- Sesia aerifrons Zeller, 1847; Chamaesphecia micra Le Cerf, 1916; Chamaesphecia owelli Le Cerf, 1916; Sesia sardoa Staudinger, 1856

Species of moth

Chamaesphecia aerifrons is a moth of the family Sesiidae. It is found in Morocco, Algeria, Tunisia, Spain, Portugal, France, southern Belgium, south-western Germany, Italy, Sicily, Dalmatia, the Republic of Macedonia, Albania, northern Greece and on Crete, Sardinia and Corsica.

The larvae feed on Origanum vulgare, Thymus vulgaris, Thymus pulegioides, Satureja montana, Calamintha nepeta, Lavandula vera and Mentha species.

== Subspecies ==
- Chamaesphecia aerifrons aerifrons (Morocco, Algeria, Tunisia, Spain, Portugal, France, southern Belgium, south-western Germany, Italy, Sicily, Dalmatia, Macedonia, Albania, northern Greece, Crete)
- Chamaesphecia aerifrons sardoa (Staudinger, 1856) (Sardinia, Corsica)
