= Chamaesphecia schwingenschussi =

Scientific classification
- Kingdom: Animalia
- Phylum: Arthropoda
- Clade: Pancrustacea
- Class: Insecta
- Order: Lepidoptera
- Family: Sesiidae
- Genus: Chamaesphecia
- Subgenus: Scopulosphecia
- Species: C. schwingenschussi

Binomial name
- Chamaesphecia schwingenschussi (Le Cerf, 1937)

Synonyms
- Dipsosphecia schwingenschussi Le Cerf, 1937

Species of moth

Chamaesphecia schwingenschussi is a moth of the family Sesiidae. It is found in Turkey, Transcaucasia and Iran.

The larvae feed on Thymus species.
