= Chamaesphecia turbida =

Scientific classification
- Kingdom: Animalia
- Phylum: Arthropoda
- Clade: Pancrustacea
- Class: Insecta
- Order: Lepidoptera
- Family: Sesiidae
- Genus: Chamaesphecia
- Subgenus: Chamaesphecia
- Species: C. turbida

Binomial name
- Chamaesphecia turbida Le Cerf, 1937

Species of moth

Chamaesphecia turbida is a moth of the family Sesiidae. It is found in eastern Turkey, Iran and the Caucasus.

The larvae feed on the roots of species in the genus Euphorbia.
