= Chamaesphecia anatolica =

Scientific classification
- Kingdom: Animalia
- Phylum: Arthropoda
- Clade: Pancrustacea
- Class: Insecta
- Order: Lepidoptera
- Family: Sesiidae
- Genus: Chamaesphecia
- Subgenus: Scopulosphecia
- Species: C. anatolica

Binomial name
- Chamaesphecia anatolica Schwingenschuss, 1938

Species of moth

Chamaesphecia anatolica is a moth of the family Sesiidae. It is found in Turkey, Greece, Serbia and Montenegro, Romania and Hungary.

The larvae feed on the roots of Nepeta species, including Nepeta spruneri and Nepeta parnassica.
