= Chamaesphecia thracica =

Scientific classification
- Kingdom: Animalia
- Phylum: Arthropoda
- Clade: Pancrustacea
- Class: Insecta
- Order: Lepidoptera
- Family: Sesiidae
- Genus: Chamaesphecia
- Subgenus: Scopulosphecia
- Species: C. thracica

Binomial name
- Chamaesphecia thracica Z. Lastuvka, 1983

Species of moth

Chamaesphecia thracica is a moth of the family Sesiidae. It is found in Italy and most of the Balkan Peninsula. It is also found from Asia Minor to the Middle East.

The larvae feed on Stachys shirkei and Stachys germanica.
