= Chamaesphecia amygdaloidis =

Scientific classification
- Kingdom: Animalia
- Phylum: Arthropoda
- Clade: Pancrustacea
- Class: Insecta
- Order: Lepidoptera
- Family: Sesiidae
- Genus: Chamaesphecia
- Subgenus: Chamaesphecia
- Species: C. amygdaloidis

Binomial name
- Chamaesphecia amygdaloidis Schleppnik, 1933

Species of moth

Chamaesphecia amygdaloidis is a moth of the family Sesiidae. It is found in Austria.

The larvae feed on Euphorbia austriaca and not Euphorbia amygdaloides as the species name implies.
