= Chamaesphecia seyrigi =

Scientific classification
- Kingdom: Animalia
- Phylum: Arthropoda
- Clade: Pancrustacea
- Class: Insecta
- Order: Lepidoptera
- Family: Sesiidae
- Genus: Chamaesphecia
- Species: C. seyrigi

Binomial name
- Chamaesphecia seyrigi Le Cerf, 1957

Species of moth

Chamaesphecia seyrigi is a moth of the family Sesiidae. It is known from Madagascar.
