= Chamaesphecia dumonti =

Scientific classification
- Kingdom: Animalia
- Phylum: Arthropoda
- Clade: Pancrustacea
- Class: Insecta
- Order: Lepidoptera
- Family: Sesiidae
- Genus: Chamaesphecia
- Subgenus: Scopulosphecia
- Species: C. dumonti

Binomial name
- Chamaesphecia dumonti Le Cerf, 1922

Synonyms
- Chamaesphecia similis Laštuvka, 1983

Species of moth

Chamaesphecia dumonti is a moth of the family Sesiidae. It is found from France to southern Russia and the Caucasus and from Germany south to Italy and the Balkan Peninsula., It is also found in western Turkey.

The wingspan is 18–20 mm.

The larvae feed on Stachys recta, Stachys germanica, Stachys atherocaly, Stachys caucasica and Stachys plumosa.
