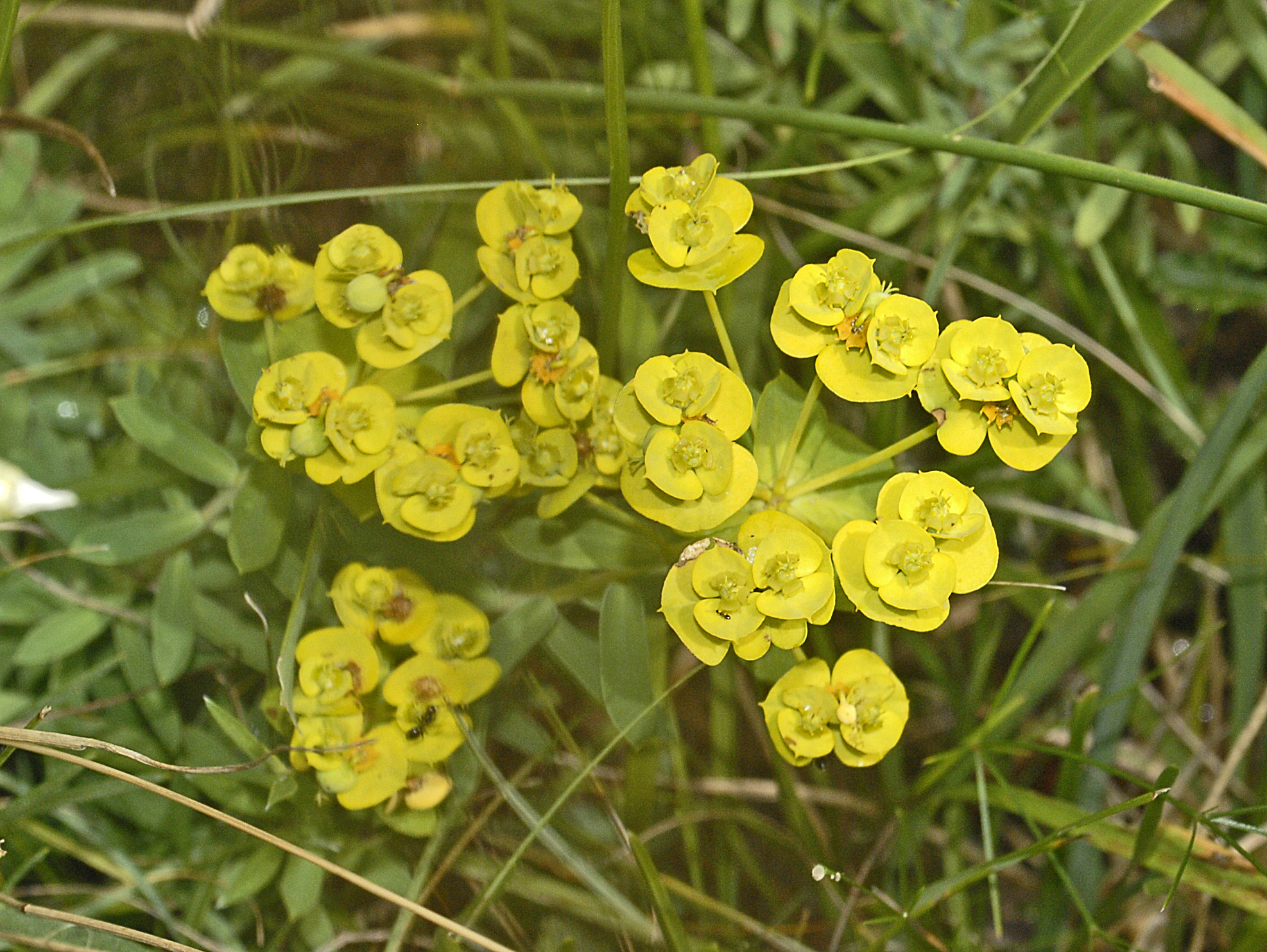
- Euphorbia nicaeensis at the Civico Orto Botanico di Trieste

Scientific classification
- Kingdom: Plantae
- Clade: Tracheophytes
- Clade: Angiosperms
- Clade: Eudicots
- Clade: Rosids
- Order: Malpighiales
- Family: Euphorbiaceae
- Genus: Euphorbia
- Species: E. nicaeensis

Binomial name
- Euphorbia nicaeensis All.

Synonyms
- Euphorbia bazargica Prodan; Euphorbia cadrilateri Prodan; Euphorbia dobrogensis Prodan; Euphorbia goldei Prokh.; Euphorbia pannonica Host; Euphorbia pseudoglareosa Klokov; Euphorbia stepposa Zoz ex Prokh.; Euphorbia volgensis Krysht.; Tithymalus nicaeensis (All.) Klotzsch & Garcke

= Euphorbia nicaeensis =

Species of flowering plant

Euphorbia nicaeensis is a species of flowering plant in the family Euphorbiaceae.

== Subspecies ==
- Euphorbia nicaeensis subsp. glareosa (Pallas ex Bieb.) A.R. Sm.
- Euphorbia nicaeensis subsp. nicaeensis

== Description ==
Euphorbia nicaeensis is a perennial, herbaceous plant or a shrub, reaching a height of about 20–50 centimetres (7.9–19.7 in). It has erect, simple, ocher-orange stems, usually leafless and covered with leaf scars on most of its length. Leaves are glaucous gray, narrowly lanceolate, oblong or ovate, about 10–75 millimetres (0.39–2.95 in) long, arranged in apical rosettes and inflorescences. The flowering period extends from June to August.

== Distribution ==
This species can be found in southern and eastern Europe (Spain, Portugal, Italy, Croatia), in Turkey, in the Caucasus and in Algeria.
