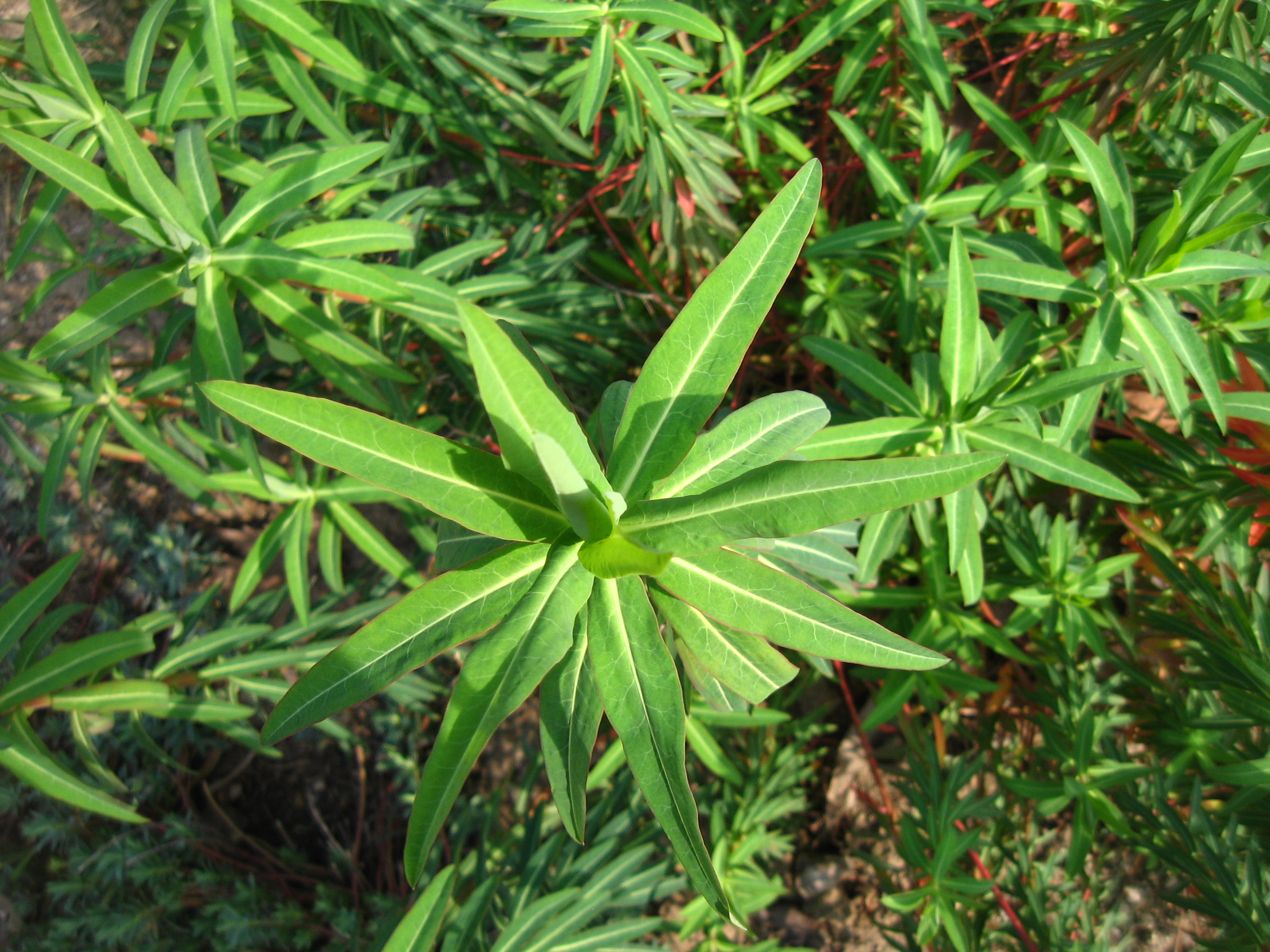

Scientific classification
- Kingdom: Plantae
- Clade: Embryophytes
- Clade: Tracheophytes
- Clade: Spermatophytes
- Clade: Angiosperms
- Clade: Eudicots
- Clade: Rosids
- Order: Malpighiales
- Family: Euphorbiaceae
- Genus: Euphorbia
- Species: E. ceratocarpa

Binomial name
- Euphorbia ceratocarpa Ten.

= Euphorbia ceratocarpa =

Species of flowering plant in the spurge family

Euphorbia ceratocarpa is a species of flowering plant in the spurge family Euphorbiaceae, native to the Island of Sicily and southern Italy. Growing to 1.7 m (5.6 ft) tall and wide, it is an evergreen perennial or subshrub bearing long, narrow leaves with a prominent white midrib, and clusters of green and yellow flowers in summer. The flowering period may be extended in favourable locations. It is valued in cultivation for its vivid flowers, and its ability to survive drought conditions. Though hardy down to −10 °C (14 °F) it is seen at its best in a warm, sheltered position. It has gained the Royal Horticultural Society's Award of Garden Merit.

Like other members of the genus Euphorbia, all parts of the plant are toxic if ingested. When cut it produces a milky sap which may cause intense irritation to hands and eyes.
