= Afrikan Krishtofovich =

Soviet geologist, paleobotanist and botanist

Afrikan Nikolayevich Krishtofovich (Russian: Африкан Николаевич Криштофович; November 8, 1885 – November 8, 1953) was a Soviet geologist, paleobotanist and botanist. His name is abbreviated as "Krysht." when attributing him as the author of botanical names.

He was a fossil hunter specializing in Mesozoic flora. In 1932 he published his book Geological review of the countries of the Far East.

A crater on Mars was named in his honor. Located at 48.5°S 262.8°W, with a diameter of 112.0 Kilometers. The craters name was approved in 1982 by what is now known as VSEGEI.
