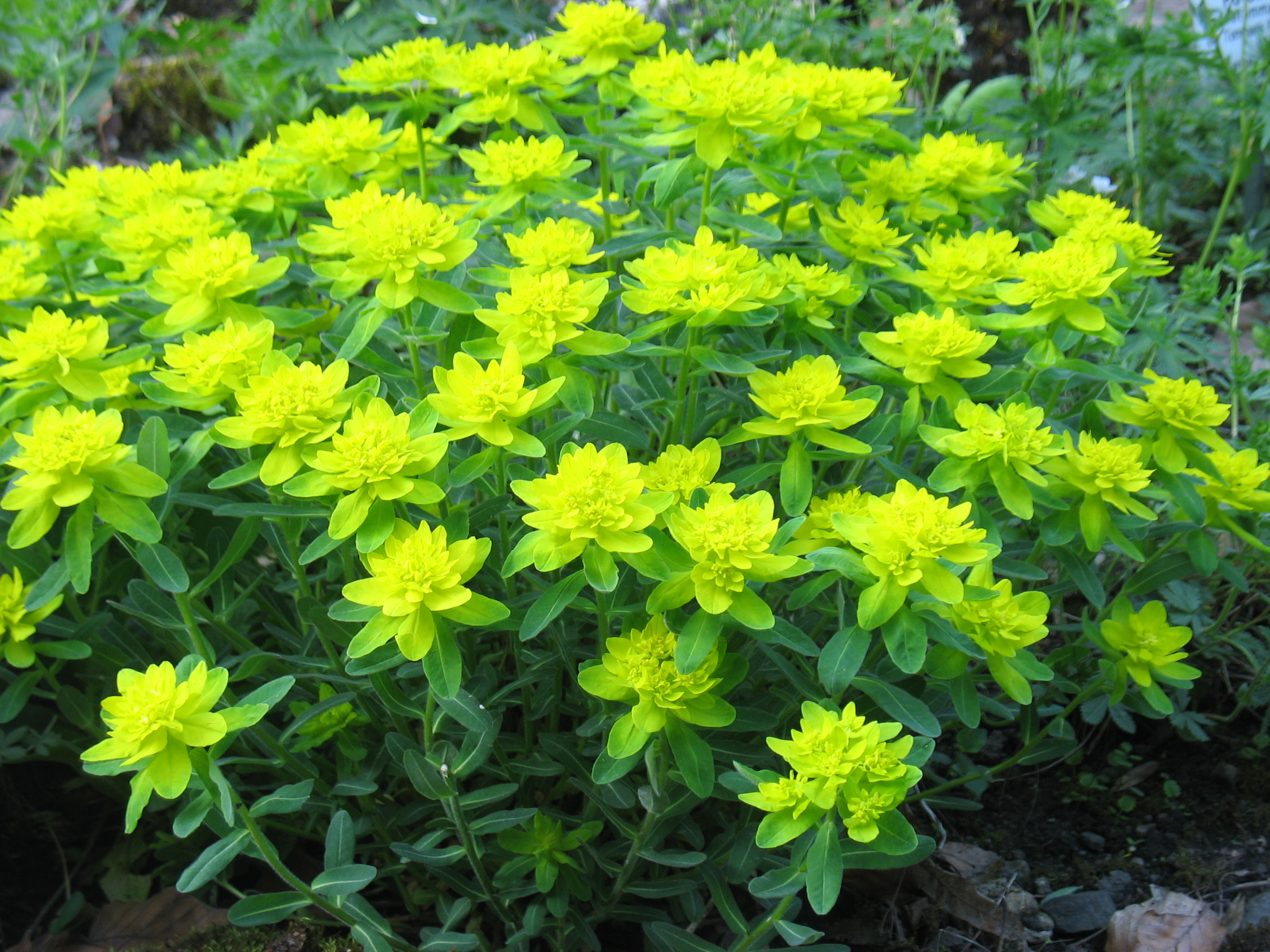

Scientific classification
- Kingdom: Plantae
- Clade: Embryophytes
- Clade: Tracheophytes
- Clade: Spermatophytes
- Clade: Angiosperms
- Clade: Eudicots
- Clade: Rosids
- Order: Malpighiales
- Family: Euphorbiaceae
- Genus: Euphorbia
- Species: E. epithymoides

Binomial name
- Euphorbia epithymoides L.

Subspecies
- E. e. subsp. epithymoides; E. e. subsp. gregersenii (K.Malý ex Beck) Frajman; E. e. subsp. lingulata (Heuff.) Nyman

Synonyms
- List: Euphorbia epithymoides var. glaberrima; Euphorbia epithymoides f. glabrescens; Euphorbia epithymoides var. macrocarpa; Euphorbia epithymoides var. polychroma; Euphorbia fragifera; Euphorbia gregersenii; Euphorbia jacquinii; Euphorbia lingulata; Euphorbia mehadiensis; Euphorbia microsperma; Euphorbia polychroma; Euphorbia polychroma f. denticulata; Euphorbia polychroma subsp. lingulata; Euphorbia polychroma f. longifolia; Euphorbia polychroma subsp. microsperma; Euphorbia polychroma var. microsperma; Euphorbia villosa; Galarhoeus epithymoides; Pythius epithymoides; Tithymalus epithymoides; Tithymalus epithymoides var. microspermus; Tithymalus fragifer; Tithymalus gregersenii; Tithymalus jacquinii; Tithymalus lingulatus

= Euphorbia epithymoides =

Plant species in the spurge family

Euphorbia epithymoides, the cushion spurge, syn. E. polychroma, is a species of deciduous flowering plant in the family Euphorbiaceae, native to Libya, Turkey and East, Middle, and Southeast Europe. It is a compact, clump-forming, herbaceous perennial growing to 45 cm (18 in), bearing terminal cymes of acid yellow flower-heads (cyathia) in spring and summer. The cultivar 'Major' has gained the Royal Horticultural Society's Award of Garden Merit.

== Taxonomy ==
Euphorbia epithymoides was named by Carl Linnaeus in 1762. It is classified in the genus Euphorbia within the wider Euphorbiaceae family and has three accepted subspecies.

- Euphorbia epithymoides subsp. epithymoides – Native to central Europe from Germany to the northwestern Balkan Peninsula
- Euphorbia epithymoides subsp. gregersenii – Native to Gostović Valley in Bosnia and Hercegovina
- Euphorbia epithymoides subsp. lingulata – Native to Eastern Europe from Ukraine southwards to Greece and northwestern Turkey

There are 25 synonyms of Euphorbia epithymoides or one of its three subspecies, including 15 species names presented in the following table.

Table of Synonyms
Name	Year	Synonym of:	Notes
Euphorbia fragifera Schur	1866	subsp. epithymoides	= het., nom. illeg. homonym. post.
Euphorbia gregersenii K.Malý ex Beck	1920	subsp. gregersenii	≡ hom.
Euphorbia jacquinii Fenzl ex Boiss.	1862	subsp. epithymoides	= het.
Euphorbia lingulata Heuff.	1835	subsp. lingulata	≡ hom.
Euphorbia mehadiensis Kit.	1864	subsp. lingulata	= het.
Euphorbia microsperma (Murb.) K.Malý	1949	subsp. epithymoides	= het.
Euphorbia polychroma A.Kern.	1875	subsp. epithymoides	= het.
Euphorbia villosa Friv. ex Boiss.	1862	subsp. epithymoides	= het., pro syn.
Galarhoeus epithymoides (L.) Haw.	1812	E. epithymoides	≡ hom.
Pythius epithymoides (L.) Raf.	1838	E. epithymoides	≡ hom.
Tithymalus epithymoides (L.) Klotzsch & Garcke	1860	E. epithymoides	≡ hom.
Tithymalus fragifer Klotzsch & Garcke	1860	subsp. epithymoides	= het.
Tithymalus gregersenii (K.Malý ex Beck) Soják	1979	subsp. gregersenii	≡ hom.
Tithymalus jacquinii (Fenzl ex Boiss.) Soják	1972	subsp. epithymoides	= het.
Tithymalus lingulatus (Heuff.) Soják	1972	subsp. lingulata	≡ hom.
Notes: ≡ homotypic synonym; = heterotypic synonym
