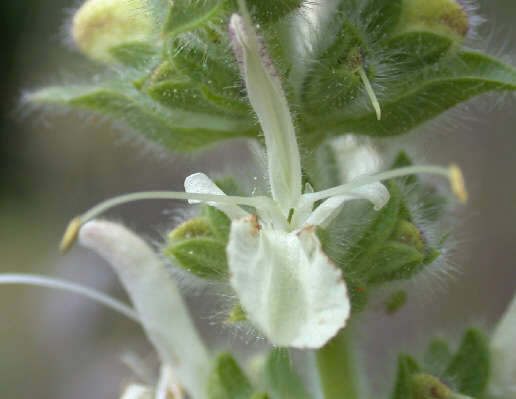

Scientific classification
- Kingdom: Plantae
- Clade: Tracheophytes
- Clade: Angiosperms
- Clade: Eudicots
- Clade: Asterids
- Order: Lamiales
- Family: Lamiaceae
- Genus: Salvia
- Species: S. austriaca

Binomial name
- Salvia austriaca Jacq.

= Salvia austriaca =

Species of flowering plant

Salvia austriaca, or Austrian sage, is a native of high altitudes across Russia and eastern Europe. The plant has a basal rosette of leaves 1 m across, which gives off a fetid odor when brushed. The individual leaves are approx. 30 cm long, with indented midrib and veins. The flower stalk grows 60 cm or more above the foliage, with pale yellow flowers in whorls of six or more that make an inflorescence 20–25 cm long.
