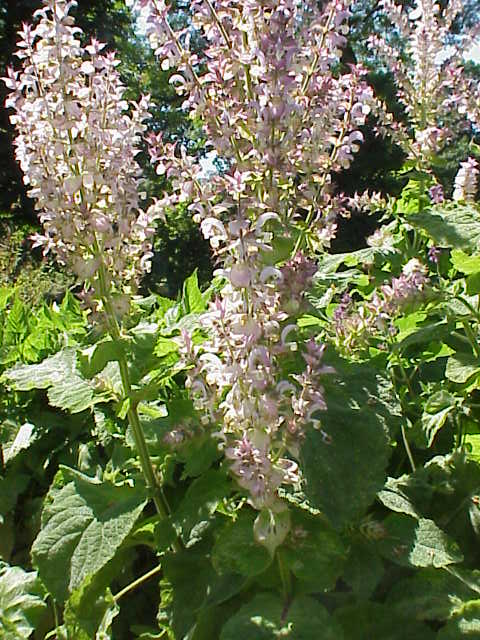

Scientific classification
- Kingdom: Plantae
- Clade: Tracheophytes
- Clade: Angiosperms
- Clade: Eudicots
- Clade: Asterids
- Order: Lamiales
- Family: Lamiaceae
- Genus: Salvia
- Species: S. sclarea

Binomial name
- Salvia sclarea L.

Synonyms
- List: Aethiopis sclarea (L.) Opiz; Salvia altilabrosa Pau; Salvia calostachya Gand.; Salvia coarctata Vahl; Salvia haematodes Scop.; Salvia lucana Cavara & Grande; Salvia pamirica Gand.; Salvia sclarea var. calostachya (Gand.) Nyman; Salvia sclarea var. hispanica Gavioli; Salvia sclarea var. turkestaniana Mottet; Salvia simsiana Schult.; Salvia turkestanica Noter; Sclarea vulgaris Mill.

= Salvia sclarea =

Plant species in the mint family

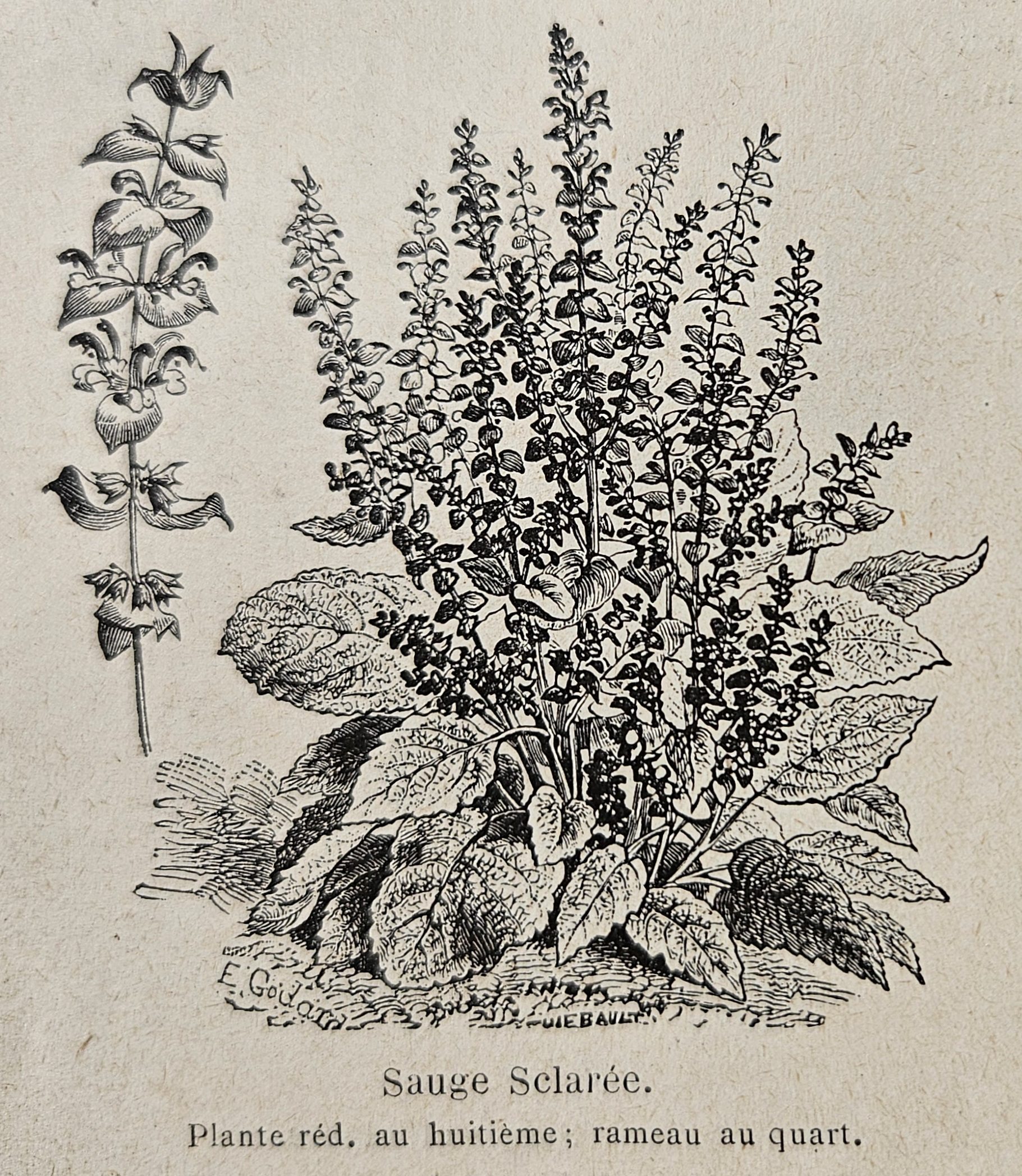
Sauge sclarée in "Les plantes potagères" Vilmorin 1925

Salvia sclarea, the clary or clary sage (clary deriving from Middle English clarie, from Anglo-Norman sclaree, from Late or Medieval Latin sclarēia meaning clear), is a biennial (short-lived) herbaceous perennial in the genus Salvia. It is native to the northern Mediterranean Basin and to some areas in north Africa and Central Asia. The plant has long been cultivated as an herb and is currently grown for its essential oil.

== Description ==
Salvia sclarea reaches 3 to 4 ft (0.91 to 1.22 m) in height, with thick, square stems covered in hairs. The leaves are approximately 1 ft (0.30 m) long at the base, and .5 ft (0.15 m) long higher up on the plant. The upper leaf surface is rugose, and covered with glandular hairs. The flowers are in verticils, with between two and six flowers in each verticil, and are held in large colorful bracts that range in color from pale mauve to lilac or white-to-pink with a pink mark on the edge. The lilac or pale-blue corolla is approximately 1 in (2.5 cm), with the lips held wide open. The cultivar S. sclarea 'Turkestanica' bears pink stems, petiolate leaves, and white, pink-flecked blossoms on spikes that grow up to 30 inches (76 cm) tall.

== History ==
The plant’s medicinal uses are described as far back as the 4th century BCE, in the writings of Theophrastus, as well as in the 1st century CE writings of Dioscorides and Pliny the Elder).

Clary seeds have a mucilaginous coat, which is why some centuries-old herbal guides recommend placing a seed into the eye of someone with a foreign object in it so that it could adhere to the object and make it easy to remove. This practice is noted by Nicholas Culpeper in his Complete Herbal (1653), who referred to the plant as "clear-eye".

It has also long been used as an additive to wine and beer. In 16th-century Germany elderflower-infused clary was added to Rhine wines to make a more potent beverage known as Muscatel.

== Uses ==
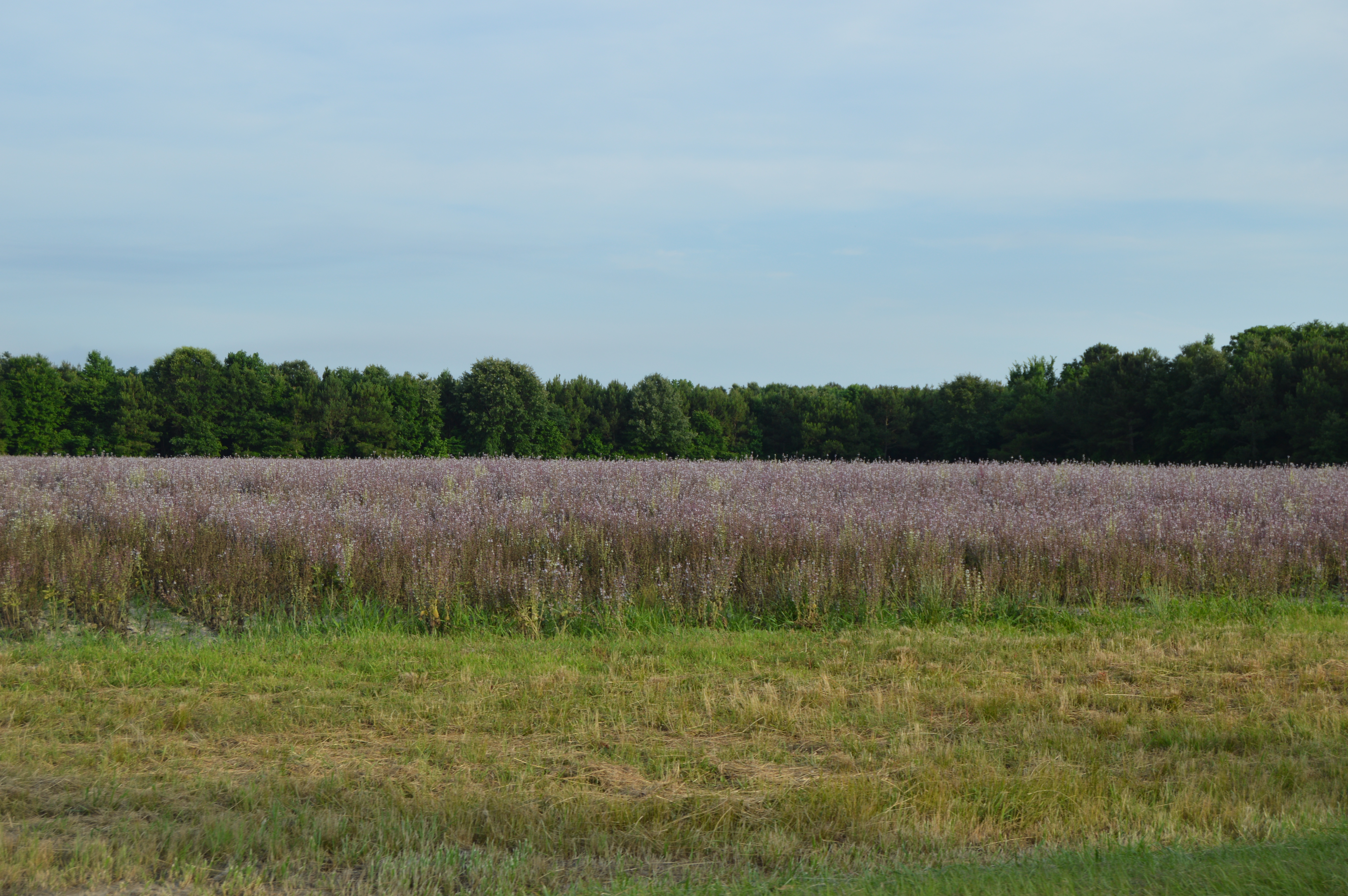
Cultivated field in northeastern North Carolina

The distilled essential oil of Salvia sclarea is used widely in perfumes (most often as a supporting note) and as a muscatel-like flavoring for vermouths, wines, and liqueurs. The aroma is described as "fresh, herbal, tea, weedy, dry, sage, spicy". It is also used in aromatherapy.

In the United States, this oil is mostly produced on a large scale in and around Bertie County in northeastern North Carolina.

== Gallery ==
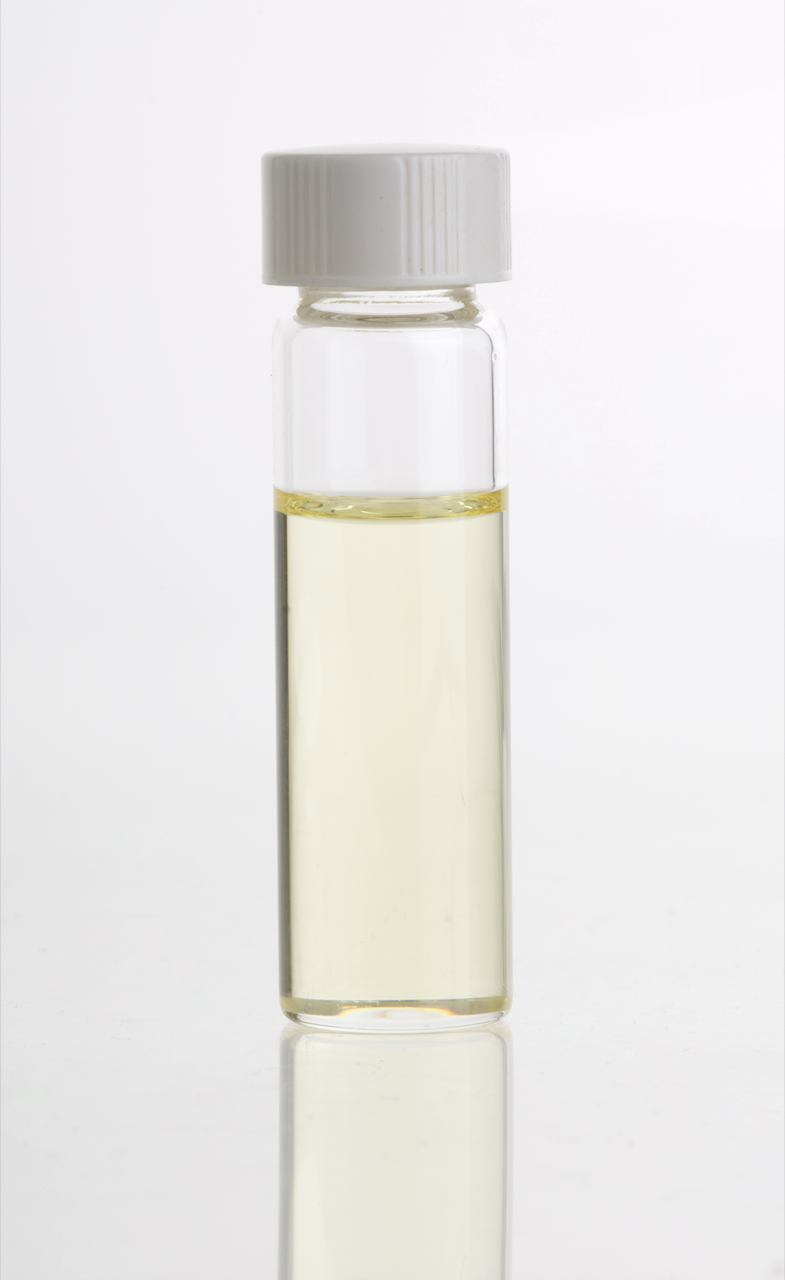
Salvia sclarea essential oil

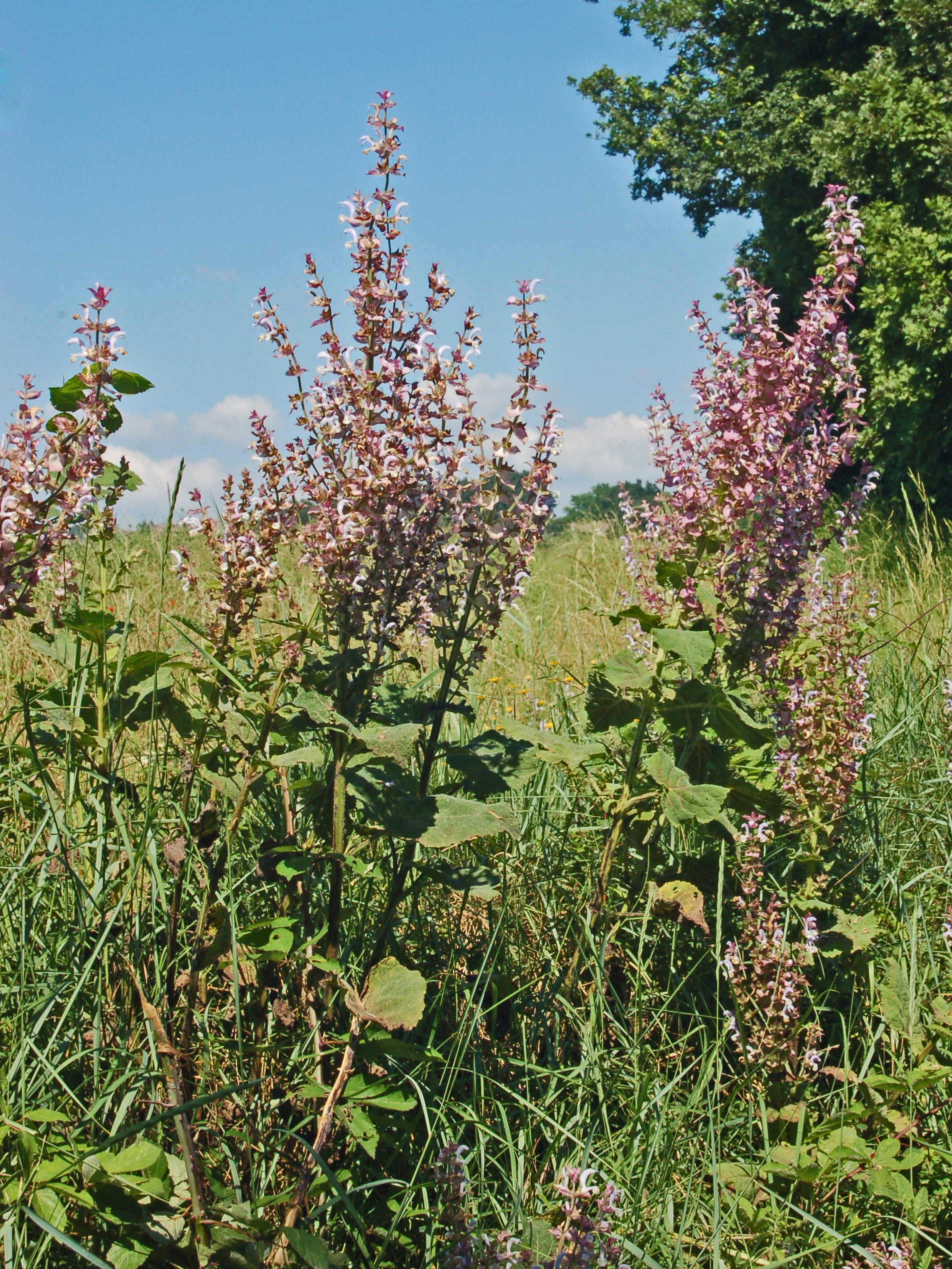
Plants of Salvia sclarea

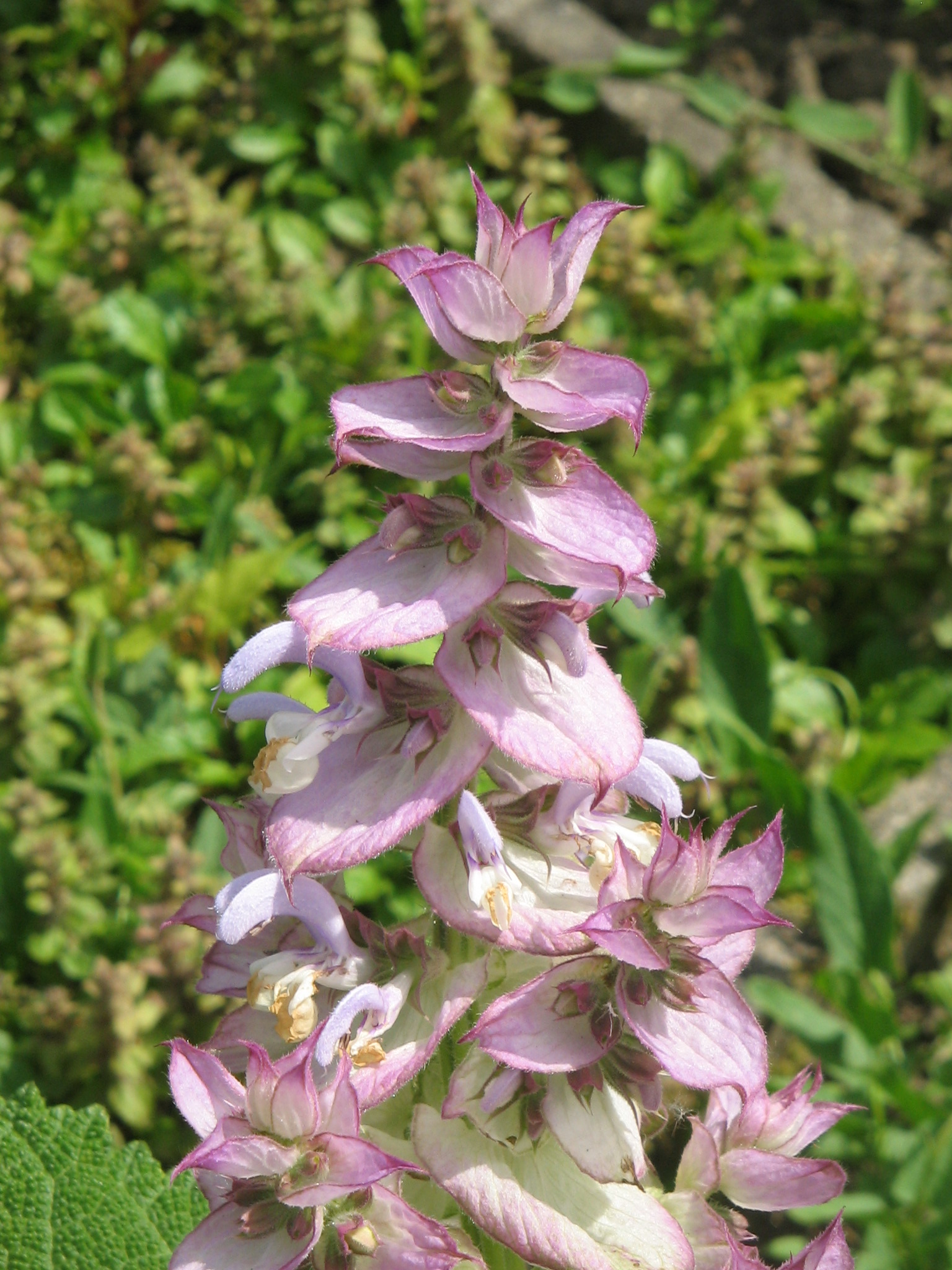
Plant of Salvia sclarea

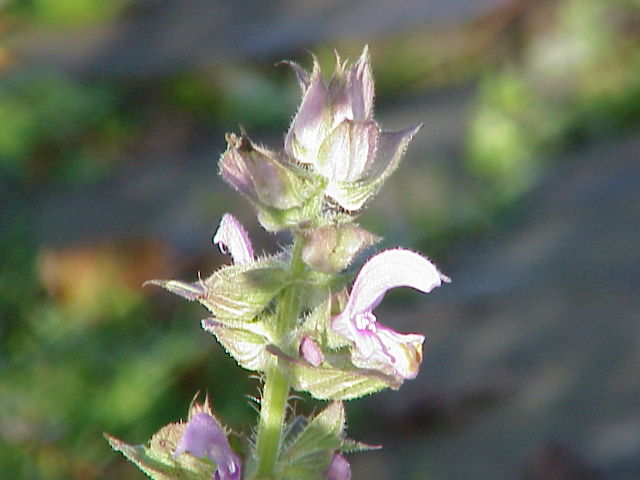
Clusters of clary flowers

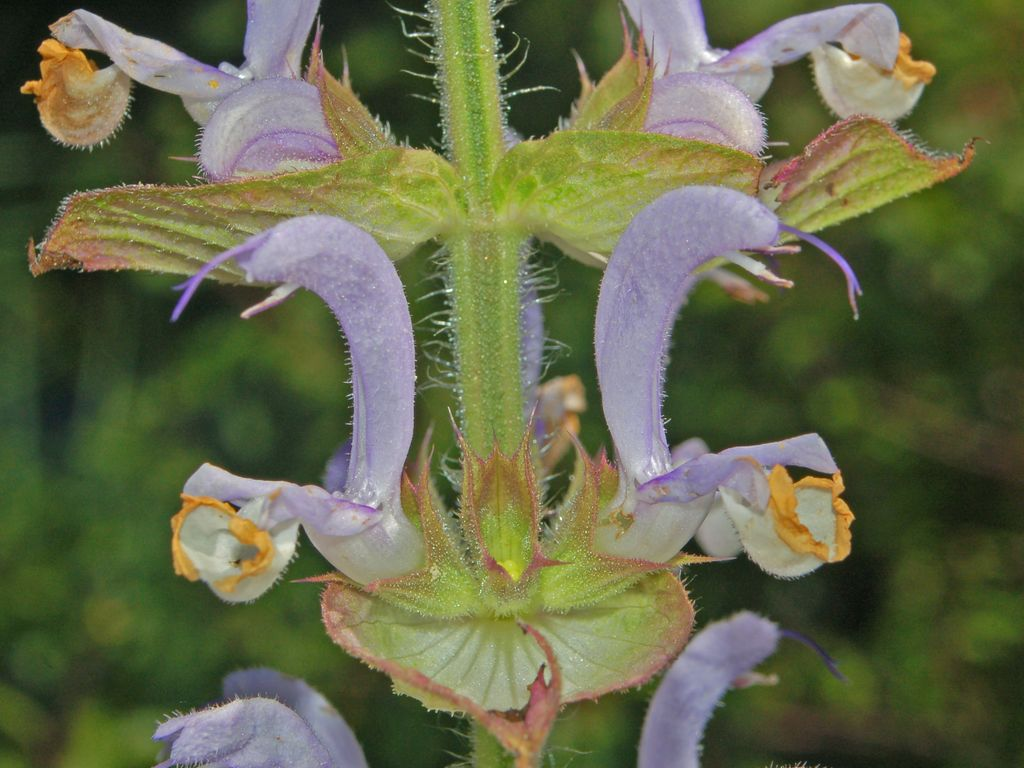
Close-up

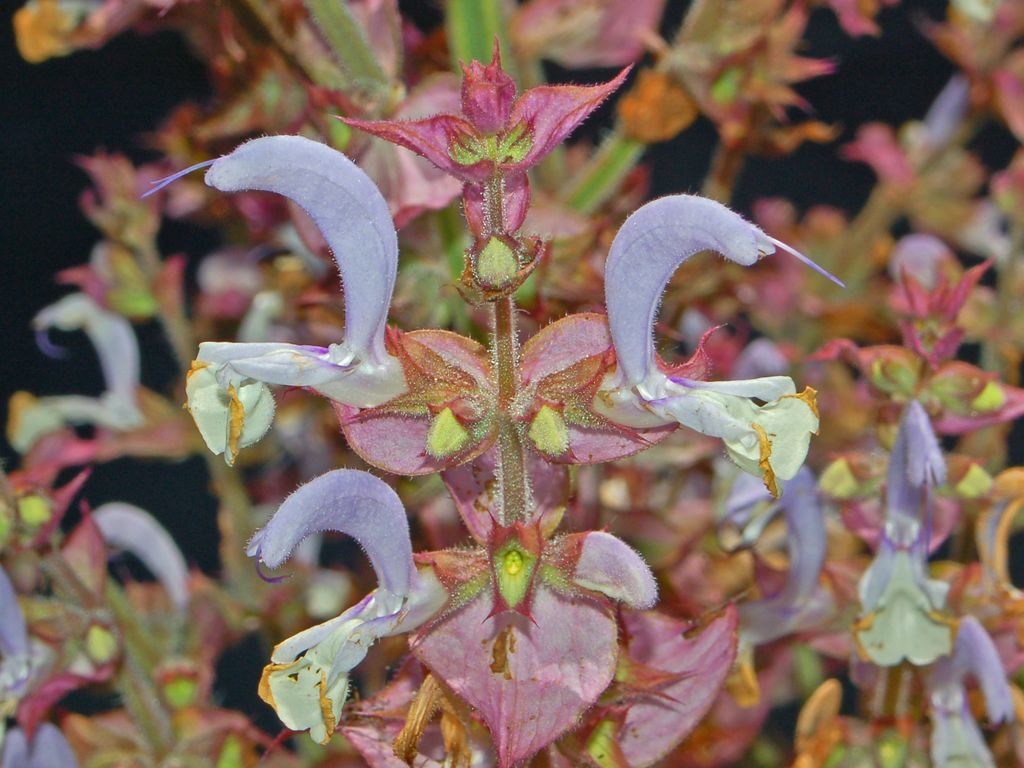
Close-up

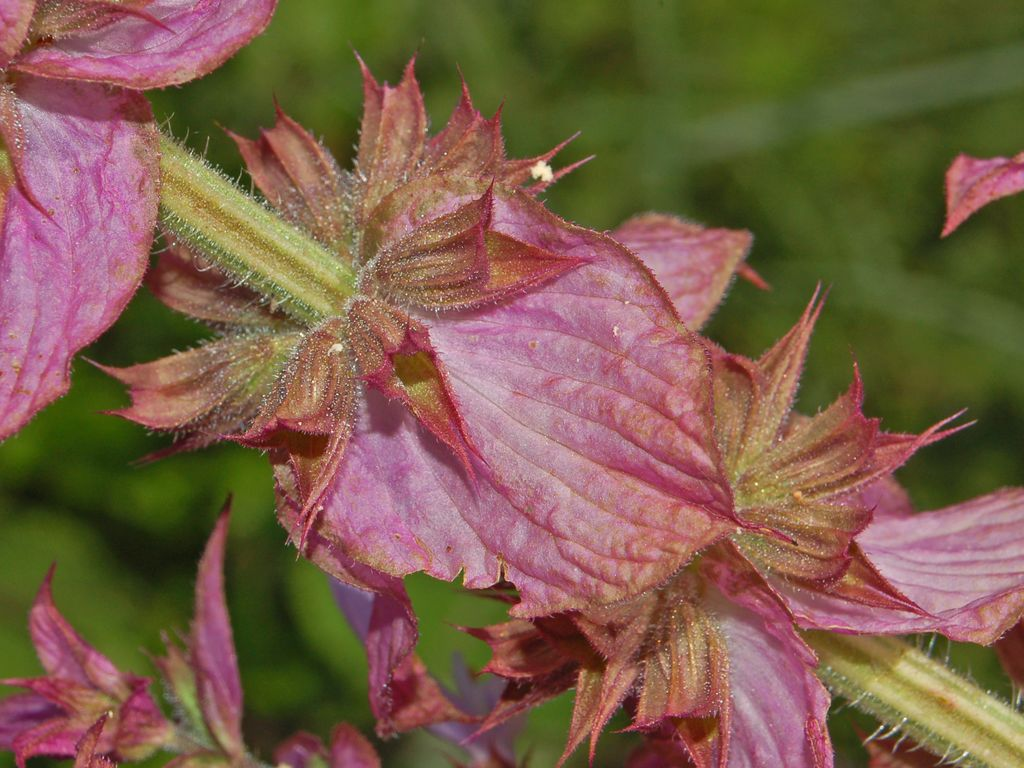

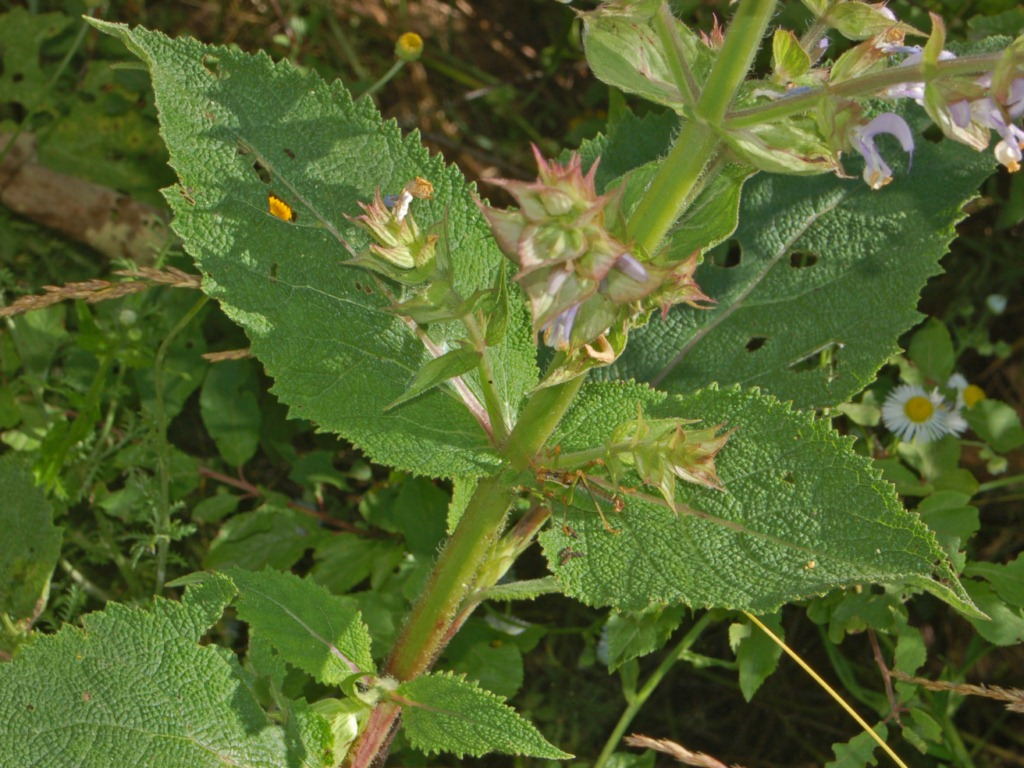
Leaves
