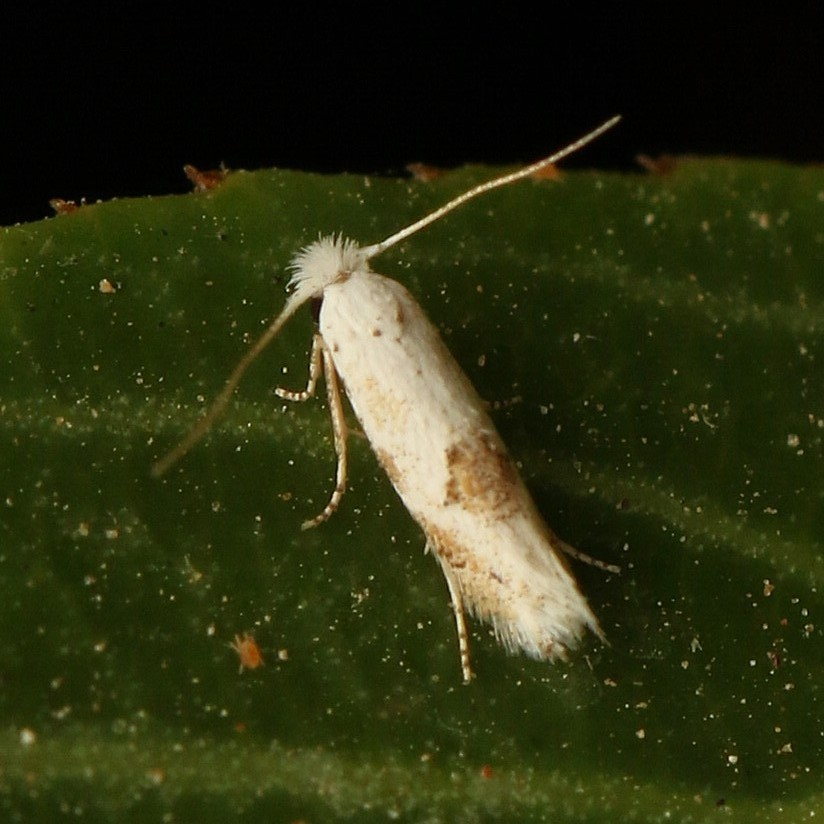

Scientific classification
- Kingdom: Animalia
- Phylum: Arthropoda
- Clade: Pancrustacea
- Class: Insecta
- Order: Lepidoptera
- Family: Bucculatricidae
- Genus: Bucculatrix
- Species: B. albella

Binomial name
- Bucculatrix albella Stainton, 1867

= Bucculatrix albella =

Species of moth

Bucculatrix albella is a species of moth in the family Bucculatricidae. The species was first described by Henry Tibbats Stainton in 1867, and is found in southern France, Italy and on the Balkan Peninsula.
