= Phyllonorycter ilicifoliella =

Scientific classification
- Domain: Eukaryota
- Kingdom: Animalia
- Phylum: Arthropoda
- Class: Insecta
- Order: Lepidoptera
- Family: Gracillariidae
- Genus: Phyllonorycter
- Species: P. ilicifoliella

Binomial name
- Phyllonorycter ilicifoliella (Duponchel, 1843)

Synonyms
- Elachista ilicifoliella Duponchel, 1843

Species of moth

Phyllonorycter ilicifoliella is a moth of the family Gracillariidae. It is found from the Czech Republic to Portugal, Sicily and Greece and from France to Romania.

The larvae feed on Quercus cerris. They mine the leaves of their host plant.
