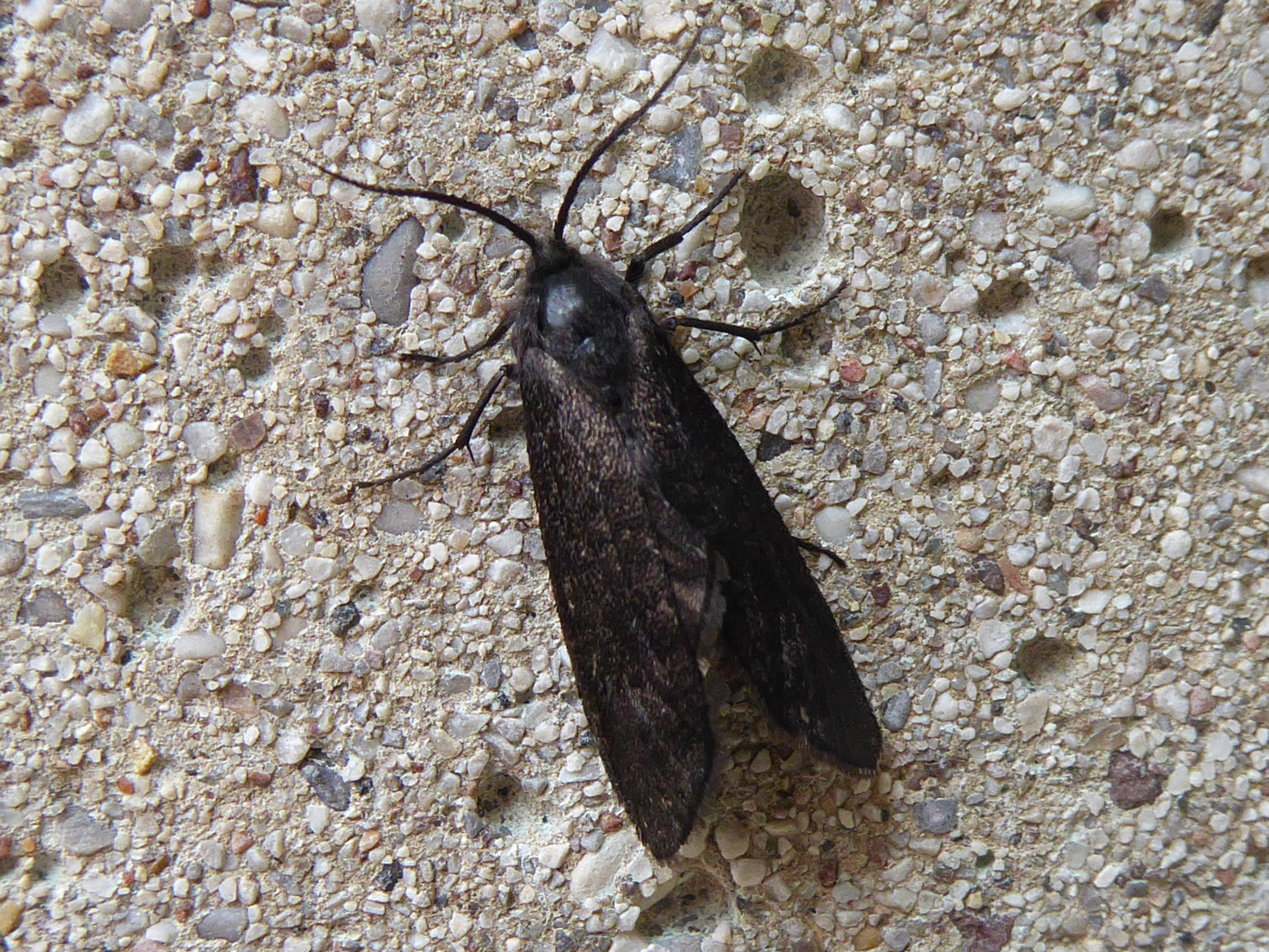
- Adult female

Scientific classification
- Domain: Eukaryota
- Kingdom: Animalia
- Phylum: Arthropoda
- Class: Insecta
- Order: Lepidoptera
- Family: Psychidae
- Genus: Typhonia
- Species: T. ciliaris

Binomial name
- Typhonia ciliaris (Ochsenheimer, 1810)

Synonyms
- Melasina ciliaris Ochsenheimer, 1810; Eyprepia ciliaris; Bombyx lugubris Hübner, 1803; Melasina melana Frivaldsky, 1838; Typhonia melas Boisduval, 1840; Melasina ciliarella Bruand, 1853; Typhonia ciliarivicinella Bruand, 1853; Typhonia semilugubrella Bruand, 1853; Typhonia melanosella Bruand, 1853; Typhonia punctatella Bruand, 1853; Typhonia melantella Bruand, 1853; Typhonia lugubrosella Bruand, 1853; Typhonia phryganilugubrella Bruand, 1853; Melasina aequalis Osthelder, 1938

= Typhonia ciliaris =

Species of moth

Typhonia ciliaris is a moth of the Psychidae family. It is found in central, southern and south-western Europe.
