= Phyllonorycter delitella =

Scientific classification
- Domain: Eukaryota
- Kingdom: Animalia
- Phylum: Arthropoda
- Class: Insecta
- Order: Lepidoptera
- Family: Gracillariidae
- Genus: Phyllonorycter
- Species: P. delitella

Binomial name
- Phyllonorycter delitella (Duponchel, 1843)

Synonyms
- Elachista delitella Duponchel, 1843

Species of moth

Phyllonorycter delitella is a moth of the family Gracillariidae. It is found from southern Germany to Spain, Corsica, Sardinia, Italy and Greece and from France to Romania.

The larvae feed on Quercus pubescens. They mine the leaves of their host plant.
