= Eupithecia denticulata =

Scientific classification
- Domain: Eukaryota
- Kingdom: Animalia
- Phylum: Arthropoda
- Class: Insecta
- Order: Lepidoptera
- Family: Geometridae
- Genus: Eupithecia
- Species: E. denticulata

Binomial name
- Eupithecia denticulata (Treitschke, 1828)

Synonyms
- Larentia denticulata Treitschke, 1828; Eupithecia denticulata anatolicata Pinker, 1976

Species of moth

Eupithecia denticulata is a moth in the family Geometridae. It is found in France, Germany, Switzerland, Italy, Poland, Slovakia, Hungary, Ukraine, Romania, Bulgaria and Serbia.
