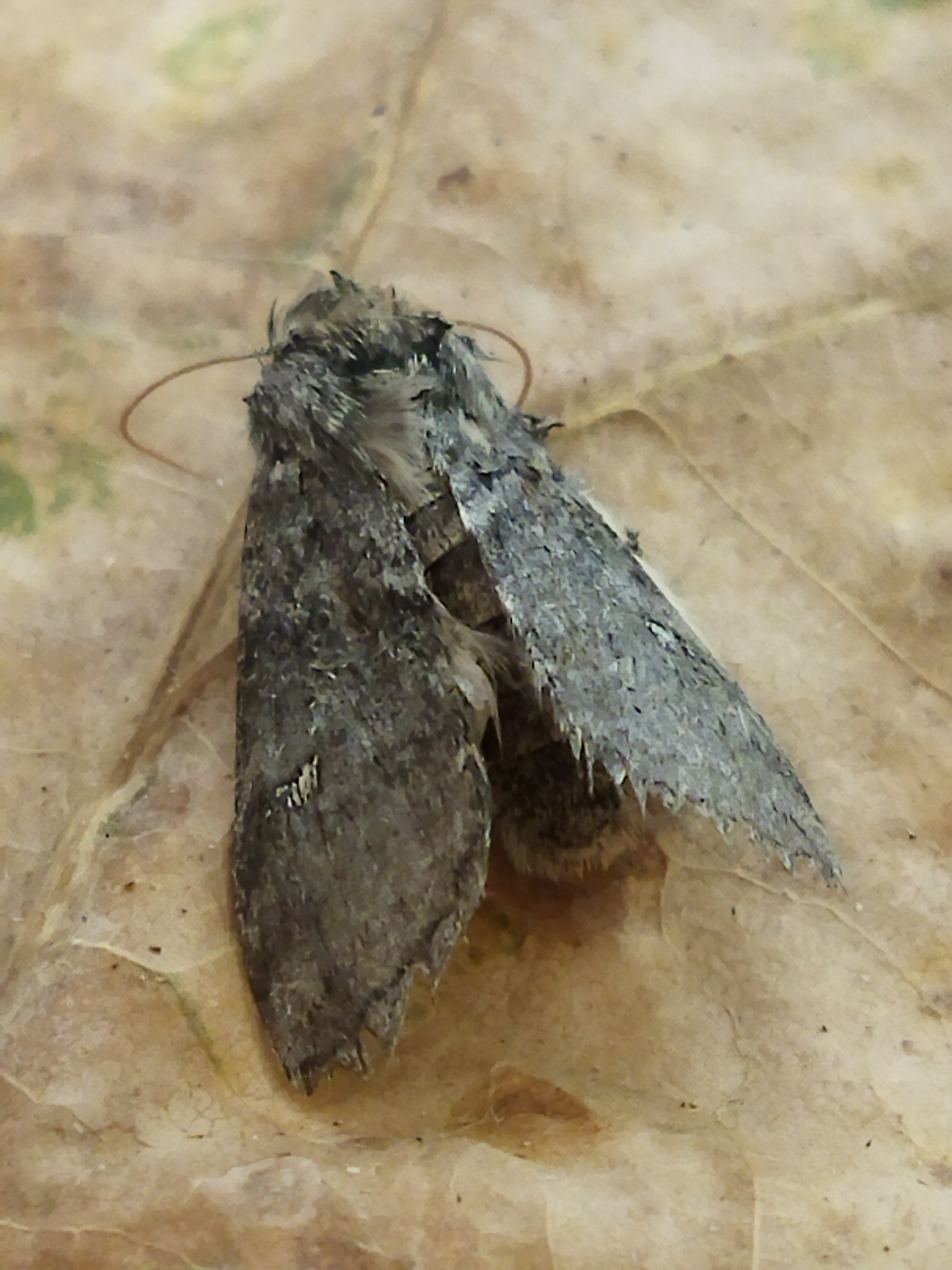

Scientific classification
- Kingdom: Animalia
- Phylum: Arthropoda
- Class: Insecta
- Order: Lepidoptera
- Family: Drepanidae
- Subfamily: Thyatirinae
- Genus: Asphalia; Hübner, [1821]
- Species: A. ruficollis

Binomial name
- Asphalia ruficollis (Denis & Schiffermüller, 1775))

Synonyms
- Noctua ruficollis Denis & Schiffermüller, 1775; Polyploca ruficollis

= Asphalia =

Monotypic moth genus in family Drepanidae

Asphalia is a monotypic moth genus in the family Drepanidae first described by Jacob Hübner in 1821. Its only species, Asphalia ruficollis, was described by Michael Denis and Ignaz Schiffermüller in 1775. It is found in France, Italy, Austria, Switzerland, Slovakia, Serbia, Bosnia and Herzegovina, Slovenia, Croatia, Hungary, Bulgaria, Romania, North Macedonia, Greece and Asia Minor.

Adults are on wing from February to April in one generation per year.

The larvae feed on oaks (Quercus species). Larvae can be found from April to the beginning of June. The species overwinters in the pupal stage.
