= Coleophora cartilaginella =

Scientific classification
- Kingdom: Animalia
- Phylum: Arthropoda
- Class: Insecta
- Order: Lepidoptera
- Family: Coleophoridae
- Genus: Coleophora
- Species: C. cartilaginella

Binomial name
- Coleophora cartilaginella Christoph, 1872

Synonyms
- Coleophora dubiosa Toll, 1952; Coleophora medicagivora Toll, 1961; Coleophora paraspumosella Toll, 1957

Species of moth

Coleophora cartilaginella is a moth of the family Coleophoridae. It has a disjunct distribution. It has been recorded from the Iberian Peninsula, northern Russia, Hungary, Ukraine, Serbia and North Macedonia. It is also known from southern Russia, central Asia, Iran and Afghanistan.

Adults are on wing in June.

The larvae feed on Astragalus albicaulis and Medicago species. Larvae can be found from autumn to June of the following year.
