= Bucculatrix herbalbella =

Scientific classification
- Kingdom: Animalia
- Phylum: Arthropoda
- Clade: Pancrustacea
- Class: Insecta
- Order: Lepidoptera
- Family: Bucculatricidae
- Genus: Bucculatrix
- Species: B. herbalbella

Binomial name
- Bucculatrix herbalbella Chrétien, 1915

Species of moth

Bucculatrix herbalbella is a moth in the family Bucculatricidae. It was described by Pierre Chrétien in 1915. It is found in North Africa and from Austria to Spain, Italy and North Macedonia.

The wingspan is 5–6 mm.

The larvae feed on Artemisia herba-alba. They mine the leaves of their host plant. Larvae can be found from March to April and again from October to November.
