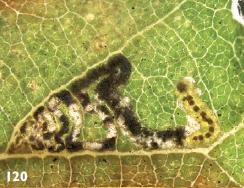
- 3rd instar larva on Quercus pubescens

Scientific classification
- Kingdom: Animalia
- Phylum: Arthropoda
- Class: Insecta
- Order: Lepidoptera
- Family: Nepticulidae
- Genus: Ectoedemia
- Species: E. rufifrontella

Binomial name
- Ectoedemia rufifrontella (Caradja, 1920)

Synonyms
- Trifurcula rufifrontella Caradja, 1920; Nepticula nigrosparsella Klimesch, 1940

= Ectoedemia rufifrontella =

Species of moth

Ectoedemia rufifrontella is a moth of the family Nepticulidae. It is found from the Czech Republic and Slovakia to southern France, Italy and Greece.

The wingspan is 4.3-6.4 mm. Adults are on wing in mid June. There is one generation per year.

The larvae feed on Quercus pubescens and occasionally also on Quercus petraea. They mine the leaves of their host plant.
