= Stigmella zangherii =

Scientific classification
- Kingdom: Animalia
- Phylum: Arthropoda
- Clade: Pancrustacea
- Class: Insecta
- Order: Lepidoptera
- Family: Nepticulidae
- Genus: Stigmella
- Species: S. zangherii

Binomial name
- Stigmella zangherii (Klimesch, 1951)

Synonyms
- Nepticula zangherii Klimesch, 1951

Species of moth

Stigmella zangherii is a moth of the family Nepticulidae. It is widespread in south-eastern Europe and Turkey, in the north to the Czech Republic and Slovakia, in the west a single specimen was recorded from south-eastern France. There are further records from eastern Austria, Hungary, mainland Italy, Sicily, Slovenia, Croatia, Yugoslavia, Greece and Turkey.

The wingspan is 3.9–5.5 mm (0.15–0.22 in). Adults are on wing from May to September.

The larvae feed on Quercus cerris, Quercus macrolepis, Quercus pubescens, Quercus suber and Quercus trojana. They mine the leaves of their host plant.
