= Phyllonorycter cydoniella =

Scientific classification
- Domain: Eukaryota
- Kingdom: Animalia
- Phylum: Arthropoda
- Class: Insecta
- Order: Lepidoptera
- Family: Gracillariidae
- Genus: Phyllonorycter
- Species: P. cydoniella

Binomial name
- Phyllonorycter cydoniella (Denis & Schiffermuller, 1775)

Synonyms
- Tinea cydoniella Denis & Schiffermuller, 1775; Lithocolletis cydoniella

Species of moth

Phyllonorycter cydoniella is a moth of the family Gracillariidae. It is known from Germany, Austria, the Czech Republic, Italy and Greece.

The larvae feed on Chaenomeles, Sorbus domestica and Sorbus torminalis. They mine the leaves of their host plant.
