= Udea uliginosalis =

Scientific classification
- Domain: Eukaryota
- Kingdom: Animalia
- Phylum: Arthropoda
- Class: Insecta
- Order: Lepidoptera
- Family: Crambidae
- Genus: Udea
- Species: U. uliginosalis

Binomial name
- Udea uliginosalis (Stephens, 1834)

Synonyms
- Botys uliginosalis Stephens, 1834; Udea monticolalis La Harpe, 1855; Udea uliginosalis Stephens, 1829

Species of moth

Udea uliginosalis is a species of moth in the family Crambidae. It is found in Great Britain, Spain, France, Germany, Switzerland, Austria, Slovenia, Slovakia, Poland, Romania, Bulgaria, Serbia and Montenegro, Albania and the Republic of Macedonia.

The wingspan is 25–30 mm. The forewings are dull ash-coloured with a pale spot behind the middle. The hindwings are paler or whitish with an ashy border on the hindmargin. Adults are on wing in July.

The larvae are probably polyphagous on low plants and/or grasses.
