= Stigmella torminalis =

Scientific classification
- Kingdom: Animalia
- Phylum: Arthropoda
- Class: Insecta
- Order: Lepidoptera
- Family: Nepticulidae
- Genus: Stigmella
- Species: S. torminalis

Binomial name
- Stigmella torminalis (Wood, 1890)

Synonyms
- Nepticula torminalis Wood, 1890

Species of moth

Stigmella torminalis is a moth of the family Nepticulidae. It is only known from one locality in Great Britain and two records in Germany.

The wingspan is 4–5 mm.

The larvae feed on Sorbus torminalis. They mine the leaves of their host plant.
