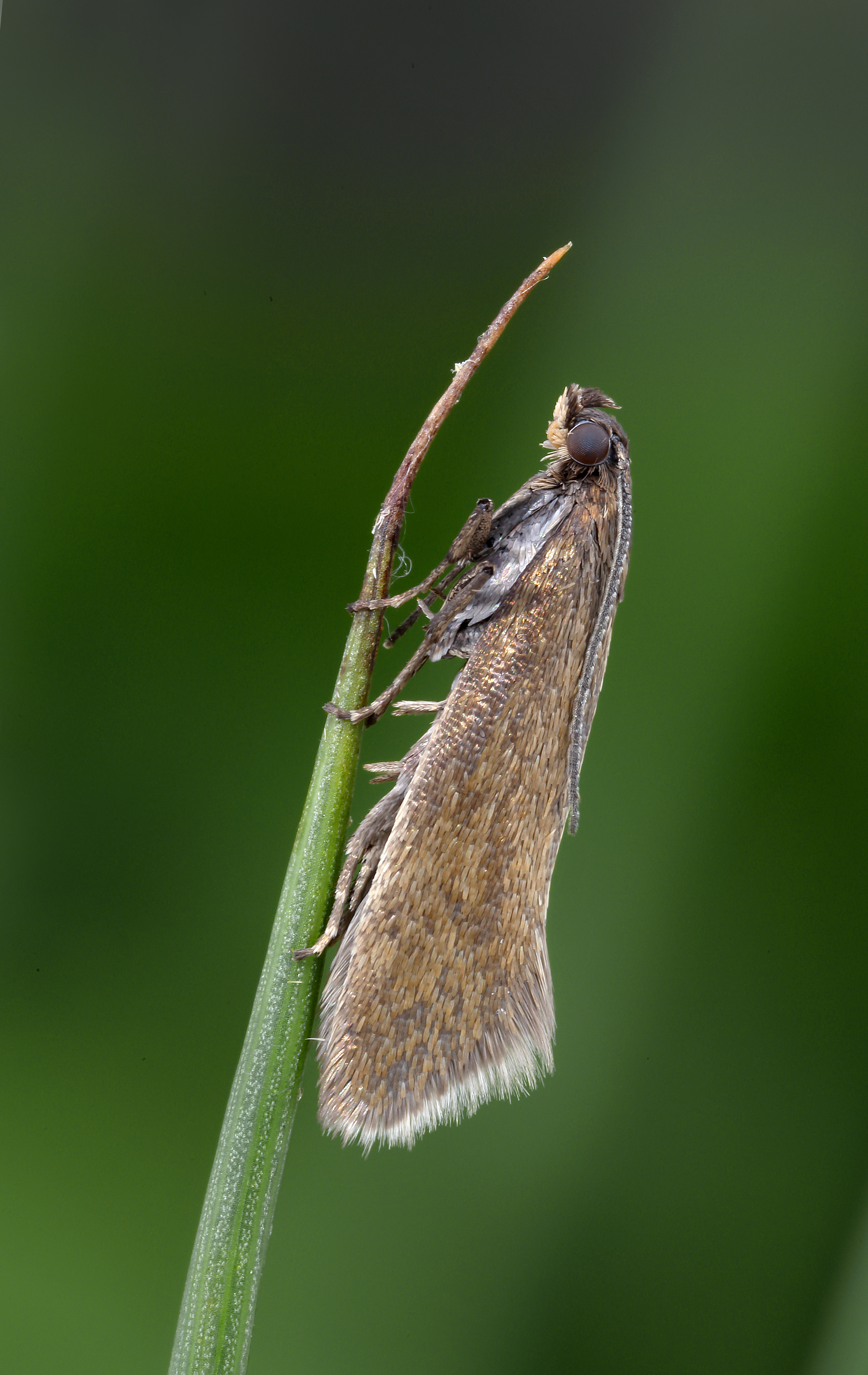

Scientific classification
- Kingdom: Animalia
- Phylum: Arthropoda
- Clade: Pancrustacea
- Class: Insecta
- Order: Lepidoptera
- Family: Glyphipterigidae
- Genus: Glyphipterix
- Species: G. fuscoviridella

Binomial name
- Glyphipterix fuscoviridella (Haworth, 1828)

Synonyms
- Tinea fuscoviridella Haworth, 1828; Adela albicostella Duponchel, [1839]; Cephalispheira aereinitidella Milliére, 1854

= Glyphipterix fuscoviridella =

Species of moth

Glyphipterix fuscoviridella is a moth of the family Glyphipterigidae. It is found in Great Britain, Belgium, France, Portugal, Spain, Switzerland, Italy, Serbia and Montenegro and Bulgaria.

The wingspan is 10–16 mm. Adults are on wing from May to June.

The larvae feed on Luzula campestris. They can be found in March and April.
