= Phyllonorycter sublautella =

Scientific classification
- Kingdom: Animalia
- Phylum: Arthropoda
- Clade: Pancrustacea
- Class: Insecta
- Order: Lepidoptera
- Family: Gracillariidae
- Genus: Phyllonorycter
- Species: P. sublautella

Binomial name
- Phyllonorycter sublautella (Stainton, 1869)

Synonyms
- Lithocolletis sublautella Stainton, 1869; Lithocolletis sardiniensis Amsel, 1939

Species of moth

Phyllonorycter sublautella is a moth of the family Gracillariidae. It is found from southern France to Greece.

The larvae feed on Quercus cerris, Quercus pubescens, Quercus robur and Quercus rubra. They mine the leaves of their host plant.
