= Coleophora trientella =

Scientific classification
- Kingdom: Animalia
- Phylum: Arthropoda
- Class: Insecta
- Order: Lepidoptera
- Family: Coleophoridae
- Genus: Coleophora
- Species: C. trientella

Binomial name
- Coleophora trientella Christoph, 1872

Synonyms
- Coleophora pilicornis Rebel, 1914; Coleophora ussuriella Caradja, 1920; Coleophora anaeli Capuse, 1967; Coleophora pilicornis ussuriella Capuse, 1974

Species of moth

Coleophora trientella is a moth of the family Coleophoridae. It is found in Slovenia, Slovakia, Hungary, Romania, Serbia and Montenegro, Ukraine, southern Russia, Turkestan, the Palestinian Territories and China. It occurs in desert biotopes and in salt-marshes.

Adults are on wing in spring and at end of summer. There are possibly two generations per year.

The larvae feed on the flowers of Corispermum species, including Corispermum lehmannianum. They create a silky, short, thick case. Larvae can be found from May to June.
