= Bucculatrix infans =

Scientific classification
- Kingdom: Animalia
- Phylum: Arthropoda
- Clade: Pancrustacea
- Class: Insecta
- Order: Lepidoptera
- Family: Bucculatricidae
- Genus: Bucculatrix
- Species: B. infans

Binomial name
- Bucculatrix infans Staudinger, 1880

Synonyms
- Bucculatrix centaureae Deschka, 1973

Species of moth

Bucculatrix infans is a moth in the family Bucculatricidae. It was described by Otto Staudinger in 1880. It is found on the Balkan Peninsula and in Ukraine and Turkey.

The wingspan is about 7 mm.

The larvae feed on Centaurea triniifolia. They mine the leaves of their host plant. Larvae can be found in July. They are olive green.
