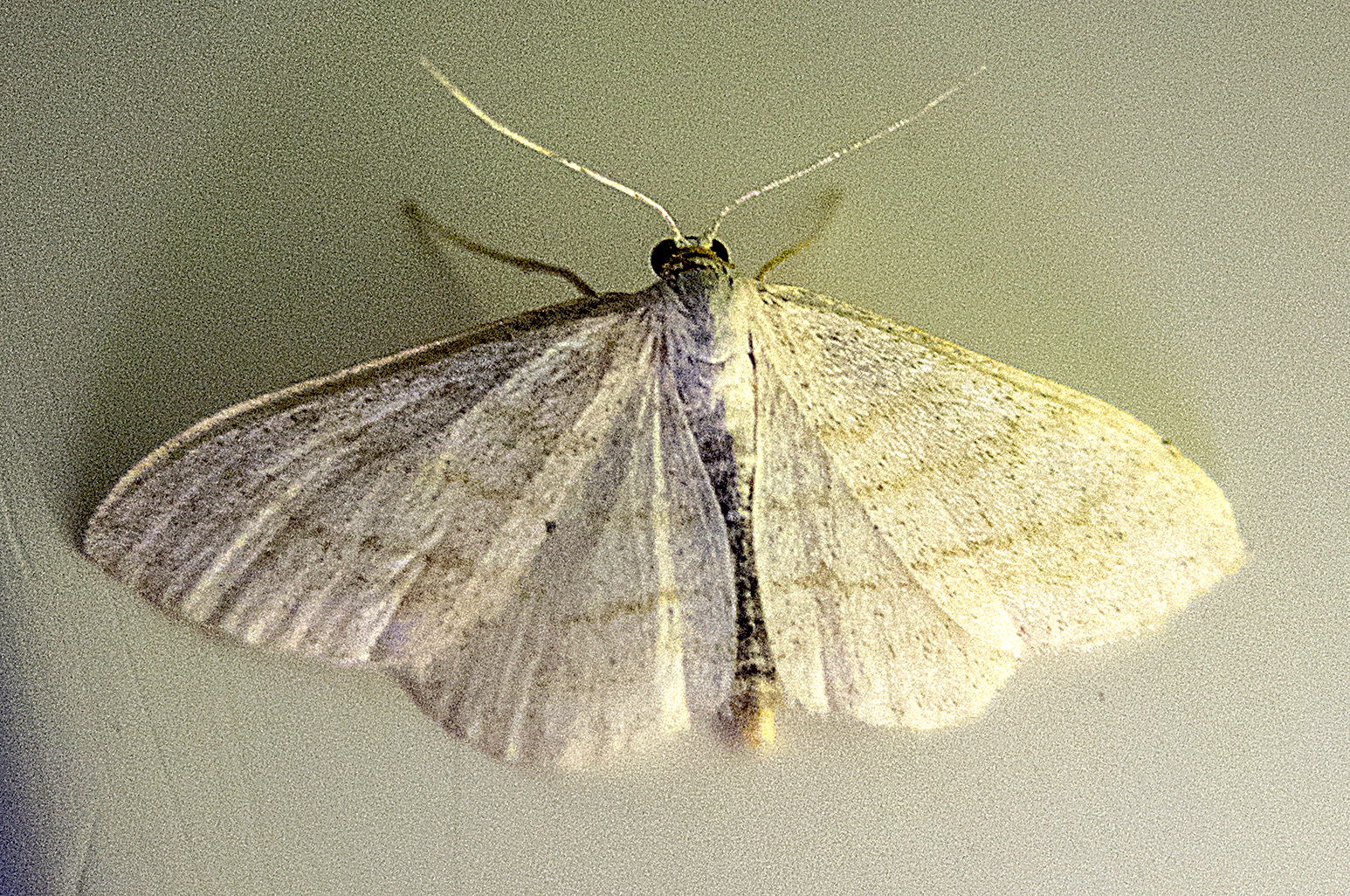

Scientific classification
- Domain: Eukaryota
- Kingdom: Animalia
- Phylum: Arthropoda
- Class: Insecta
- Order: Lepidoptera
- Family: Geometridae
- Genus: Scopula
- Species: S. subpunctaria

Binomial name
- Scopula subpunctaria (Herrich-Schäffer, 1847)

Synonyms
- List: Acidalia subpunctaria Herrich-Schäffer, 1847; Scopula cerusaria La Harpe, 1850; Acidalia depunctata Guenee, 1858; Phalaena punctata Scopoli, 1763

= Scopula subpunctaria =

Species of geometer moth in subfamily Sterrhinae

Scopula subpunctaria is a species of moth in the family Geometridae. It is found from northern and north-eastern China to the southern Palearctic realm (including southern and central Europe).
