= Coleophora aleramica =

Scientific classification
- Kingdom: Animalia
- Phylum: Arthropoda
- Clade: Pancrustacea
- Class: Insecta
- Order: Lepidoptera
- Family: Coleophoridae
- Genus: Coleophora
- Species: C. aleramica

Binomial name
- Coleophora aleramica Baldizzone & Stubner, 2007

Species of moth

Coleophora aleramica is a moth of the family Coleophoridae. It is found in central and south-eastern Europe, Asia Minor and the Near East.

The length of the forewings is about 5 mm for males and 4.5 mm for females. Adults have been recorded on flowering Trifolium species.
