= Coleophora astragalella =

Scientific classification
- Kingdom: Animalia
- Phylum: Arthropoda
- Clade: Pancrustacea
- Class: Insecta
- Order: Lepidoptera
- Family: Coleophoridae
- Genus: Coleophora
- Species: C. astragalella

Binomial name
- Coleophora astragalella Zeller, 1849

Synonyms
- Coleophora plusiella Constant, 1865; Coleophora valesianella Hering, 1957

Species of moth

Coleophora astragalella is a moth of the family Coleophoridae. It is found south of the line running from France to Ukraine, but it has not been recorded from the Balkan Peninsula. It is also known from central Asia.

Adults are on wing in June and July.
