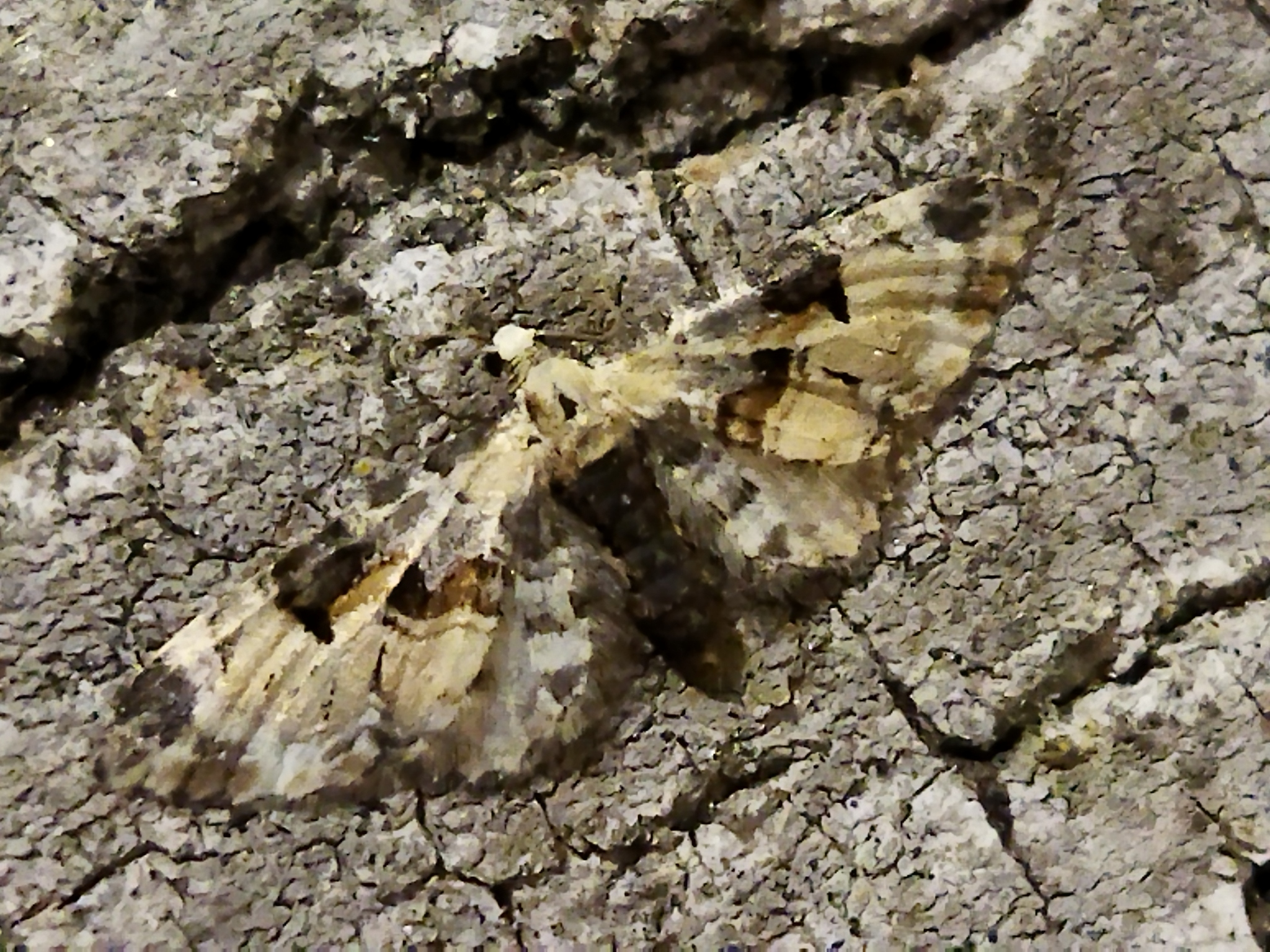

Scientific classification
- Domain: Eukaryota
- Kingdom: Animalia
- Phylum: Arthropoda
- Class: Insecta
- Order: Lepidoptera
- Family: Geometridae
- Genus: Eupithecia
- Species: E. extremata

Binomial name
- Eupithecia extremata (Fabricius, 1787)

Synonyms
- Phalaena extremata Fabricius, 1787; Eupithecia glaucomictata Mann, 1855

= Eupithecia extremata =

Species of moth

Eupithecia extremata is a species of moth in the family Geometridae. It is found on the Iberian Peninsula, Italy, Germany, Poland, Austria, Slovakia, Hungary and most of the Balkan Peninsula. It is also found in Turkey, Israel and Georgia.

The wingspan is about 16 mm.

== Subspecies ==
- Eupithecia extremata extremata
- Eupithecia extremata hangayi Vojnits, 1977
