= Scrobipalpa voltinella =

Scientific classification
- Kingdom: Animalia
- Phylum: Arthropoda
- Class: Insecta
- Order: Lepidoptera
- Family: Gelechiidae
- Genus: Scrobipalpa
- Species: S. voltinella

Binomial name
- Scrobipalpa voltinella (Chrétien, 1898)

Synonyms
- Lita voltinella Chrétien, 1898

Species of moth

Scrobipalpa voltinella is a moth in the family Gelechiidae. It was described by Pierre Chrétien in 1898. It is found in southern Europe (Spain, southern France, Italy, Croatia, Serbia, Turkey, and Ukraine).

The wingspan is 11–12 mm (0.43–0.47 in). The larvae mine the leaves of their host plant, Leuzea conifera (=Rhaponticum coniferum) and Tanacetum corymbosum (these are taxonically distant hosts, rising suspicion that the information is erraneous).
