= Exodus =

Exodus or the Exodus may refer to:

== Religion ==
- Book of Exodus, second book of the Hebrew Torah and the Christian Bible
- The Exodus, the biblical story of the migration of the ancient Israelites from Egypt into Canaan

== Historical events ==
- Exodus of 1879 (the Kansas Exodus), in which black Americans known as Exodusters fled the Southern US for Kansas
- The Exodus (1940), in Belgium and France
- 1948 Palestinian expulsion and flight
- 1948 Palestinian exodus from Lydda and Ramle
- 1949–1956 Palestinian exodus
- Exodus of Turks from Bulgaria (1950–1951)
- Naksa (1967 Palestinian exodus)
- Exodus of Iranian Jews
- 2021 Kabul airlift
- Cuban exodus
- Exodus of Kashmiri Hindus from the Kashmir Valley in 1990, during the ongoing Islamist insurgency
- Exodus of Slav-Macedonians from Greece; see Refugees of the Greek Civil War
- Istrian-Dalmatian exodus, the exodus of Italians from Istria, Fiume and Dalmatia after World War II
- Jewish exodus from Muslim countries, the twentieth century emigration, expulsion or escape of Jews, in which Jewish populations from Muslim countries moved to Israel
- Jujuy Exodus, the massive evacuation of people from the province of Jujuy, Argentina, in 1812, during the Argentine War of Independence
- Northern Cheyenne Exodus, attempt of the Northern Cheyenne to return to the north
- Operation Exodus (WWII operation), an Allied operation to repatriate European prisoners of war to Britain in the Second World War
- Palestinian exodus from Kuwait (1990–91)
- SS Exodus, a ship carrying thousands of Jewish refugees in 1947 that was refused entry into British Mandatory Palestine

== Arts and media ==
=== Literature ===
- Exodus (poem), an Old English retelling of the Biblical departure
- Exodus (Uris novel), 1958, by Leon Uris, based partly on the story of the Jewish refugee ship by that name
- Exodus (Bertagna novel), a 2002 science fiction novel by Julie Bertagna
- Exodus (White and Meier novel), a 2007 science fiction novel by Steve White and Shirley Meier
- Transformers: Exodus by Alexander C. Irvine
- Exodus: How Migration Is Changing Our World, a book by development economist Paul Collier
- Exodus, a 2013 novel by Lars Iyer
- The Invention of Religion (original title: Exodus), a 2015 book by Jan Assmann

=== Film ===
- Exodus (1960 film), by Otto Preminger based on the novel by Leon Uris
- Exodus (2007 British film), a contemporary retelling of the Biblical story of Exodus
- Exodus (2007 Hong Kong film), directed by Pang Ho-Cheung
- Exodus: Tales from the Enchanted Kingdom, a 2005 Filipino film
- Exodus: Gods and Kings (2014), a Ridley Scott movie about Moses
- Exodus (2015 film), a Georgian film
- Exodus (2020 film), an Iranian film directed by Ebrahim Hatamikia
- Exodus (2025 film), a UK production dramatic film directed by Serkan Nihat

=== Gaming ===
- Exodus (role-playing game), a post-apocalyptic role-playing game by Glutton Creeper Games
- Exodus: Journey to the Promised Land, a 1991 video game developed by Color Dreams centering on Moses' journey to The Promised Land
- Exodus (Magic: The Gathering), an expansion to the Magic: The Gathering collectible card game from the Rath block
- Oddworld: Abe's Exoddus, a 1998 video game
- Ground Control II: Operation Exodus, a 2004 real-time tactical game in the Ground Control series
- Ultima III: Exodus, a 1983 computer role-playing game in the Ultima series
- Metro Exodus, the third instalment in a post-apocalyptic first person shooter series
- Exodus (2027 video game), developed by Archetype Entertainment, announced in 2023

=== Music ===
==== Bands and labels ====
- Exodus (band), thrash metal band from California
- Exodus (Icelandic band), jazz fusion band formed by Björk
- Exodus (Polish band), Polish symphonic rock band
- Exodus (musician) (born 1984), Ugandan singer
- Exodus Records, semi-independent label started in 1966

==== Albums ====
- Exodus (soundtrack), 1961, by Ernest Gold from the 1960 film
- Exodus (Slide Hampton album), 1964
- Exodus (Bob Marley and the Wailers album), 1977
- Exodus (New Power Generation album), 1995
- Exodus (Samael album), 1998 EP by Samael
- Exodus (compilation album), 1998, featuring various Christian artists
- Exodus (Andy Hunter album), 2002
- The Exodus (album), 2002, by Gospel Gangstaz
- Exodus (Plus One album), 2003
- Exodus (Hikaru Utada album), 2004
- Exodus (Ja Rule album), 2005
- Exodus (Exo album), 2015
- Exodus (DMX album), 2021

==== Songs ====
- "Exodus" (Bob Marley & The Wailers song), from the album of the same name
- "Exodus", original name of the song "Emigre" by Anti-Flag from For Blood and Empire
- "Exodus", by Blessthefall from Hollow Bodies
- "Exodus", by Exo from the album of the same name
- "Exodus", by Fates Warning, from Awaken the Guardian
- "Exodus", by M.I.A. from Matangi
- "Exodus", by Noisia featuring KRS-One
- "Exodus", by Pink Martini featuring Jimmie Herrod
- "Exodus", by The Tornados
- "Exodus", by Vision Divine from their self-titled debut album
- "Exodus '04", a 2005 single by Hikaru Utada
- "Theme of Exodus", by Ernest Gold from the film Exodus, later a hit for Ferrante & Teicher
- "The Exodus Song", by Booker T & The MGs from the 1968 album Doin' Our Thing
- "Exodus: origins", a 2009 single by Weesp
- "Exodus 23:1", 2012 single by Pusha T featuring The-Dream

==== Other uses in music ====
- Exodus (Kilar), a 1981 symphonic poem by Polish composer Wojciech Kilar

=== Television ===
- "Exodus" (Battlestar Galactica), a 2006 two part episode of Battlestar Galactica
- "Exodus" (Entourage), an episode of Entourage
- "Exodus" (Lost), a 2005 three-part episode of Lost
- "The Exodus" (Sliders), a two-part episode from season three of Sliders
- "Exodus" (Smallville), an episode of Smallville
- "Exodus" (Stargate SG-1), a 2000 episode of Stargate SG-1
- "Exodus" (Supergirl), an episode of Supergirl
- "Exodus", an episode from season four of ER
- Exodus, the original subtitle of the third volume of Heroes
- "Exodus", episode 10 in the Discovery channel reality series The Colony
- "Exodus", episode 42 in the anime television series Bakugan Battle Brawlers: New Vestroia
- "Exodus", the pilot episode of the 1985–89 animated series ThunderCats
- "eXodus", an episode of The Gifted
- "Exodus", the two-part season three finale of Teenage Mutant Ninja Turtles

=== Other uses in media and entertainment ===
- Exodus (character), a Marvel Comics character and former leader of the Acolytes
- Exodus Viewer, a third party viewer for Second Life
- Exodus (custom car), a car built by Bill Cushenbery

== Organizations ==
- EXODUS (NGO), organized to bring international fugitive Jung Myung Seok to justice
- Exodus (transitional housing), an international organization providing housing and job training for ex-offenders
- Exodus Communications, a defunct internet hosting company
- Exodus International, a now defunct ex-gay organization
- Exodus Wallet, a cryptocurrency wallet available on desktop and mobile platforms

== Sociology ==
- Rural exodus, the migratory patterns that normally occur in a region following the mechanization of agriculture
- Emigration, the action and the phenomenon of leaving one's native country to settle abroad intentionally
- Forced displacement, the act of being forced to leave one's home or native country to be settled abroad

== Other uses ==
- "Exodus", a disc golf fairway driver by Infinite Discs

== See also ==
- Christian pacifism
- Diaspora (disambiguation)
- Éxodo
- Exodus Collective
- Exodus Refugee Immigration
- Human migration
- Muhajir (disambiguation)
- Purappadu (disambiguation)
- The Exodus Decoded
