= Operation Exodus =

Operation Exodus may refer to:

- Operation Exodus (WWII operation), an Allied operation to repatriate European prisoners of war to Britain in the Second World War
- Ground Control II: Operation Exodus, a 2004 computer game developed by Massive Entertainment
- Operation Exodus (Louisiana), a plan issued by the Bossier Parish, Louisiana Sheriff's Department for self-sufficiency in case of a disaster
- Operation Exodus, a fundraising campaign to assist in the emigration of Russian Jews during the 1970s.
- Operation Exodus, story by Lan Wright
- Operation Exodus on 2015 Mamasapano clash in the Philippines
- Operation Exodus, the nickname for a 1984 Greenpeace operation relocating the people of the island of Rongelap in the Marshall Islands

== See also ==
- Exodus (disambiguation)
