= Diaspora (disambiguation) =

Diaspora is the dispersion of a population from their native land, particularly involuntary mass dispersions. Originally it referred to the Jewish diaspora.

Diaspora may also refer to:

== Common uses ==
- Any particular diaspora. See List of diasporas
- Diaspora politics
  - Diaspora politics in the United States
- Diaspora studies

== Games ==
- Diaspora (role-playing game), a tabletop roleplaying game using the FATE engine

== Music ==
- Diaspora (Natacha Atlas album), 1995
- Diaspora (Christian Scott album), 2017
- Diaspora (GoldLink album), 2019
- Diaspora, an album by Cormorant, 2017
- Disapora, an album by The Ukrainians, 2009

== Other uses ==
- Diaspora (social network), a distributed social network
- Diaspora (film), a 2022 drama film by Deco Dawson
- Diaspora (novel), a science fiction book by Greg Egan
- Days in the Diaspora, a book by Kamal Ruhayyim
- Diaspora (alveolate), a genus in the phylum Apicomplexa
- Diaspora (spice company), an American company

== See also ==
- Diaspore (botany)
- Diaspore (mineral)
- Exodus (disambiguation)
- Diaphora
