= Nghia-Sinh International =

NghiaSinh International, also known as the International Volunteers for Human Service and Leadership Development, is a humanitarian organization founded in June 1963 in Saigon to provide emergency assistance to the elderly and the poor who arrived in Saigon as refugees from the countryside of Vietnam.

NghiaSinh has provided food, clothes, shelter, and medicine to war victims since 1966. Between 1968 and 1975, NghiaSinh established the Nghia-Viet High School for the poor, Hung-Vuong Social Service Center for homeless children, Tran-Binh-Trong Shelter for displaced persons, and Chanh-Hung Human Care Program for juvenile delinquents. The organization served thousands of people for 12 years in Vietnam.

As a result of its dedicated service to humanity, the Prime Minister of Vietnam, the Minister of Education, the Minister of Labor, and the Minister of Social Services presented NghiaSinh four National Medals of Honor: a Medal for Youth Scouts Services (Thanh niên Bội tinh), a Medal for Educational Services (Giáo dục Bội tinh), a Medal for Social Services (Xã hội Bội tinh), and a Medal for Employment Services (Lao động Bội tinh).

== History ==
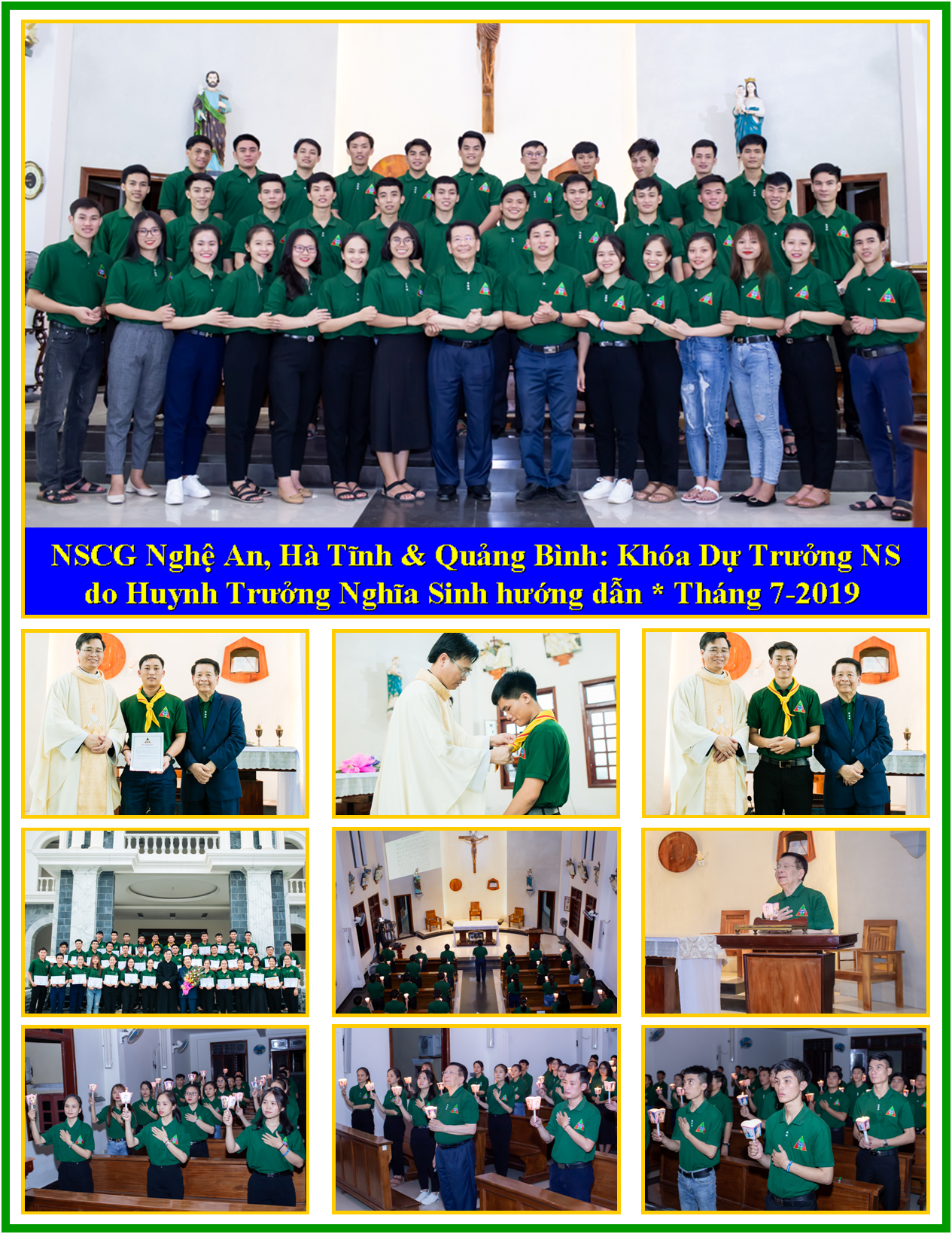
The 2019 Teamwork Skills Training Program for NghiaSinh members of the Diocese of Vinh and the Diocese of Ha Tinh

After the fall of Saigon in 1975, NghiaSinh began a new life in Chicago as a sponsor and reception agency (VOLAG) for Vietnamese and other Indochinese refugees. From 1975 to 1987, NghiaSinh resettled over 1,000 such refugees in Illinois. On some occasions, this resettlement work was carried out solely by unpaid volunteers. At other times NghiaSinh had subcontracts from the U.S. State Department/AFCR. These funds were used partly for providing direct financial assistance to newly arrived refugees and partly for paying part-time staff. This resettlement work involved airport pickups; food and housing for the first thirty days; escort; link-up with social security; access to health clinics, schools, and public aid; and access and linkage to previously resettled Indochinese refugees. Each refugee received $250 in cash upon arrival. In addition, each refugee and every refugee sponsored by NghiaSinh received $50 as a wedding gift and $50 for family funeral assistance. Over 70 percent of the refugees are now working. More than 20 percent are attending colleges while another 10 percent are taking retirement.

On Thanksgiving each year, refugees sponsored by NghiaSinh get together to thank God for His blessing, to share life experience with one another, and to celebrate with an Asian American dinner together.

Beginning in 1987, NghiaSinh started to address the issue of youth problems such as school dropouts, drugs, gangs, and crimes through its prevention programs. NghiaSinh also offered cross-cultural workshops, individual counseling sessions, after-school programs, and martial arts classes, among other programs.

At the White House in April, 1983, President Ronald Reagan personally honored NghiaSinh and its founder, Dr. Nguyen-Trung Hieu, with the Presidential Medal of Volunteer Community Service for its volunteer human care services.
