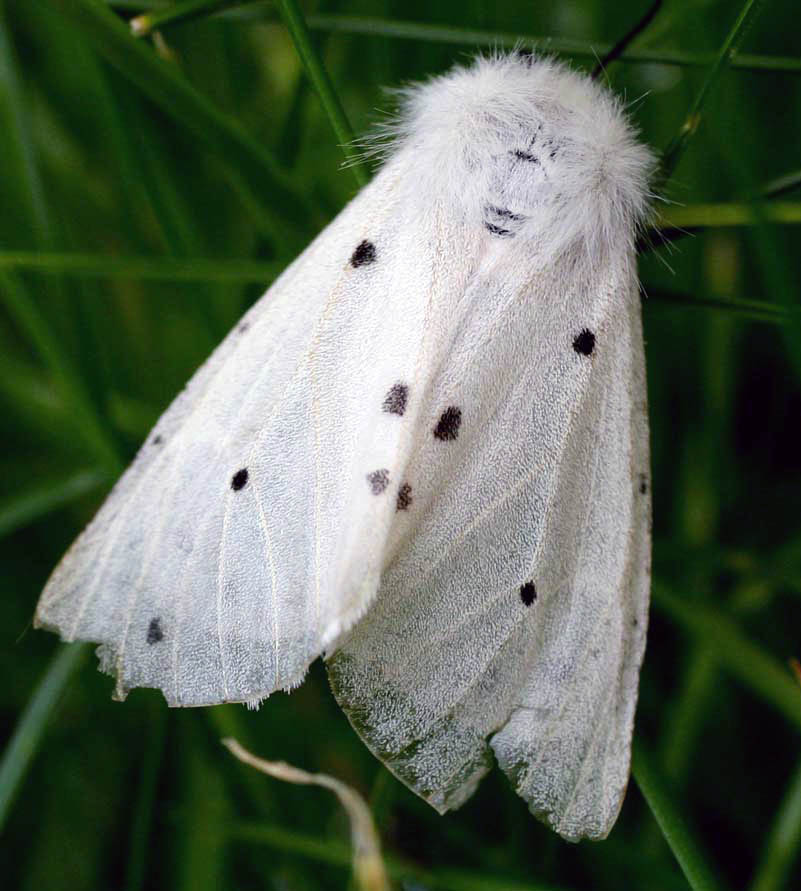
- Female
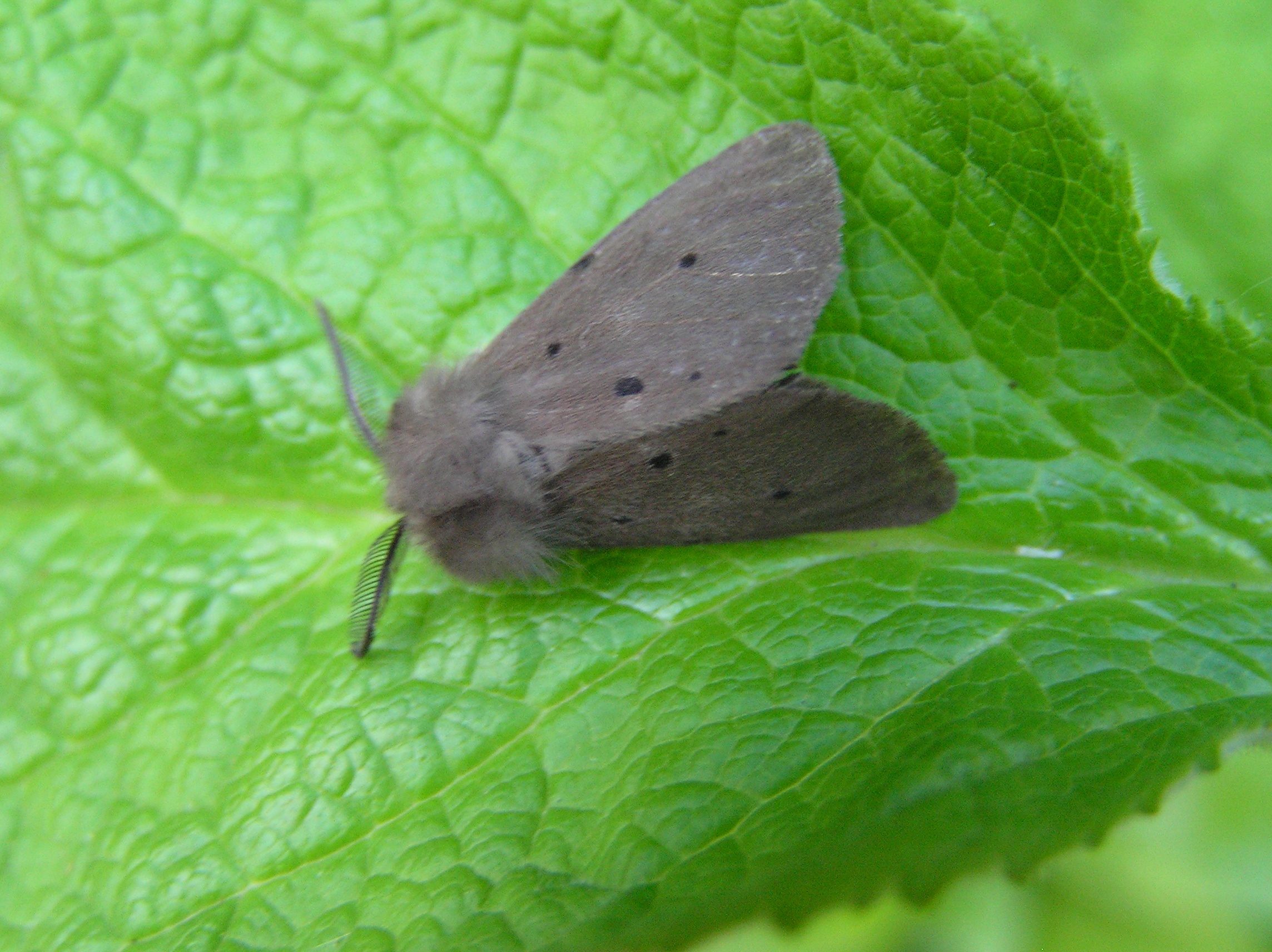
- Male

Scientific classification
- Kingdom: Animalia
- Phylum: Arthropoda
- Class: Insecta
- Order: Lepidoptera
- Superfamily: Noctuoidea
- Family: Erebidae
- Subfamily: Arctiinae
- Genus: Diaphora
- Species: D. mendica

Binomial name
- Diaphora mendica (Clerck, 1759)

Synonyms
- Cycnia mendica

= Diaphora mendica =

Muslin moth

Species of moth

Diaphora mendica, the muslin moth, is a moth of the family Erebidae. It is found in the Palearctic realm east to Lake Baikal.

== Technical description and variation ==
The wingspan is 28–38 mm. There is clear sexual dimorphism in the imago, with the male having a brownish grey colour and a forewing length of 14–17 mm, and the female being white and having a forewing length of 17–19 mm. Male sooty brown-grey, usually with a black dot at the apex of the cell; sometimes without and in other cases with a few accessory dots. The female thinly scaled, milky white, with the abdomen of the same colour; wings very sparsely dotted, ab. rustica Hbn. are males with the ground colour milky white like that of the females. ab. binaghii Tur. are transitional specimens from the normal brown males of mendica to rustica. — Schultz names female specimens with only one black dot ab. depuncta. By pairing the white males of rustica with normal females of mendica (which is an interbreeding of races and not hybridisation, as is usually reported) peculiar sand-coloured males result, which are called standfussi. If the female of standfussi is recrossed with the male of rustica a white and much dotted moth results, the form inversa Car.. But we have true hybridisation if the male of rustica is crossed with another species of the genus, e.g., with Diaphora sordida Hbn.; from this cross-breeding a real hybrid is obtained, viz., f. hybr. viertli Car. This may again be paired with other forms, e.g., viertli with f. inversa Car., by which cross hilaris Car. is obtained, or with mendica, whence beata Car. results, etc.

The female resembles Spilosoma lubricipeda, but that species has longer and smaller wings and a yellow and black back.

== Biology ==
The moth flies April to July depending on the location.

Egg light yellow. Larva grey-brown, greenish laterally, with reddish brown warts and foxy red hairs; on the back a median line, which is sometimes indistinct. Pupa stumpy, glossy red brown. The larvae feed on birch, willow, Rumex, Lamium and Plantago.

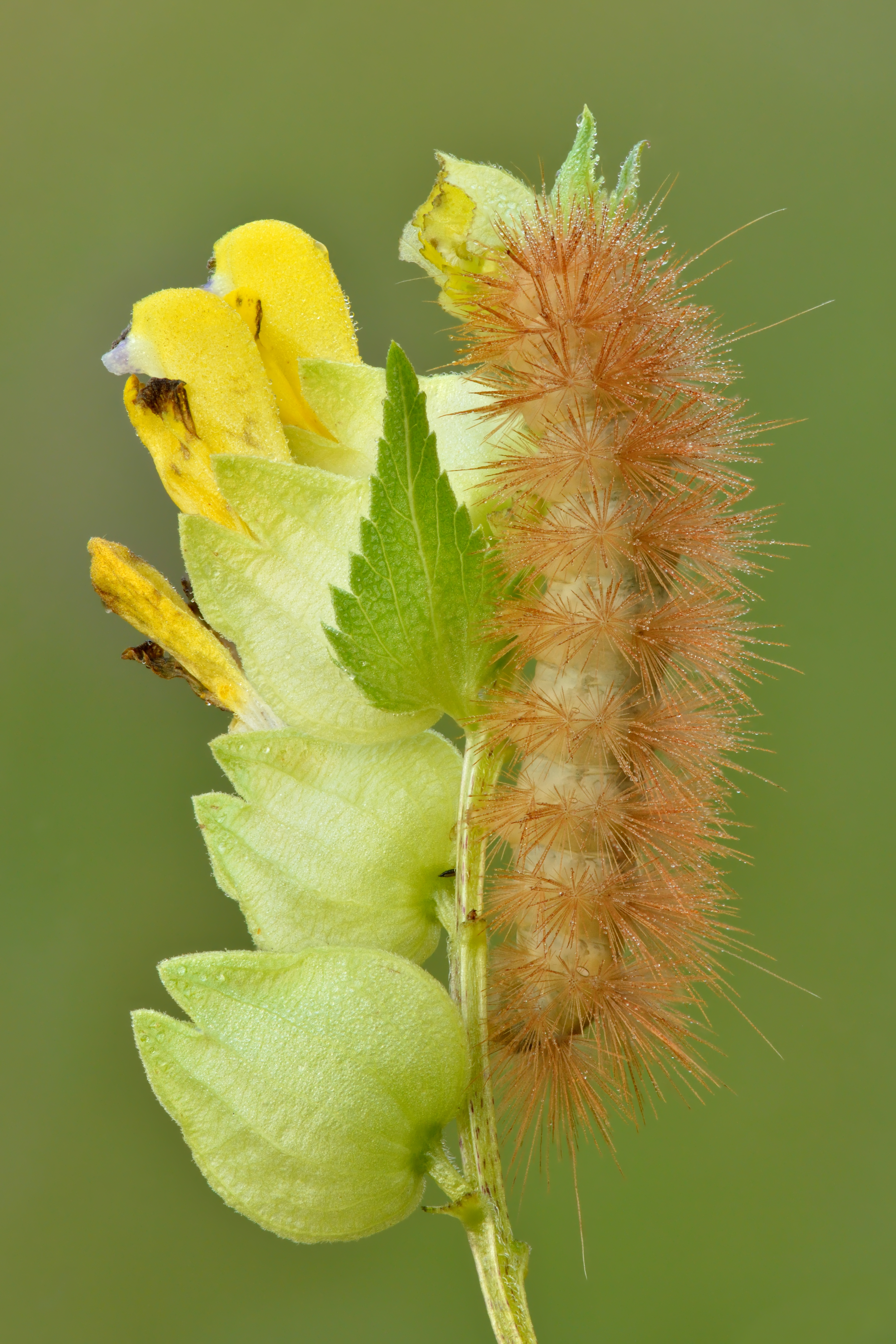
Caterpillar

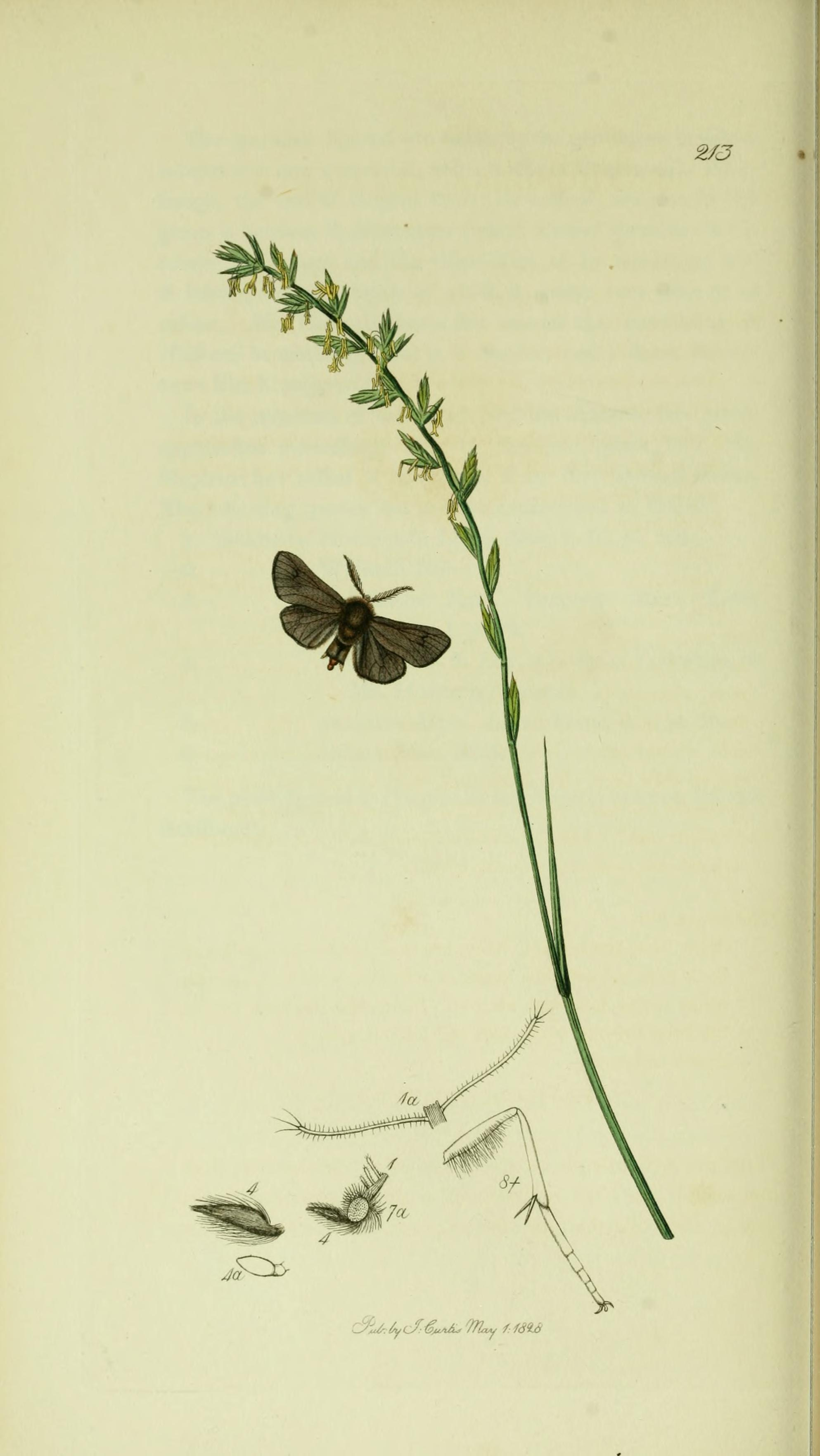
Illustration from John Curtis's British Entomology Volume 5
