= Halfway house =

Institution that allows people to re-integrate into society

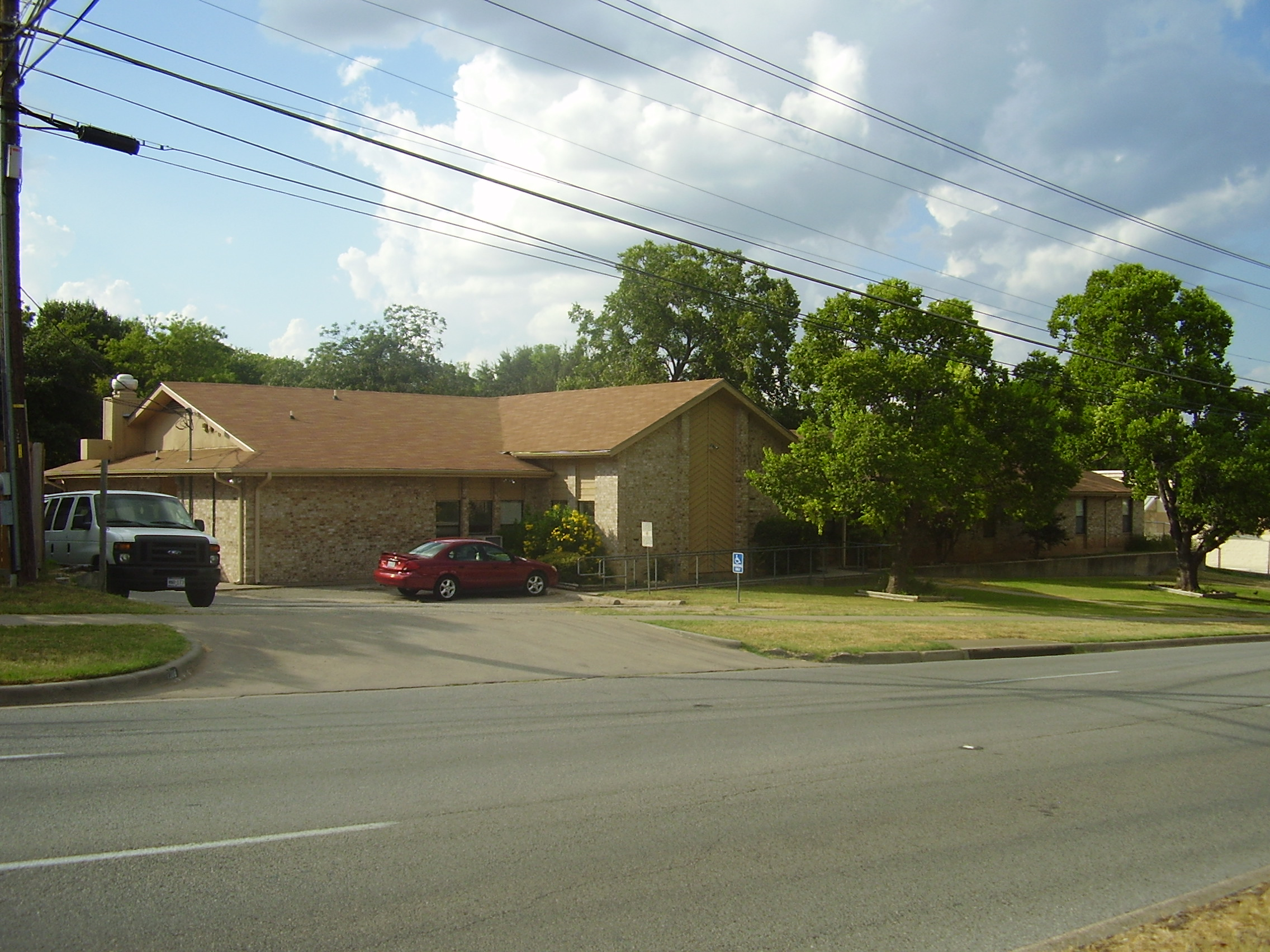
The Turman Halfway House, a Texas Department of Juvenile Justice halfway house in Austin, Texas, U.S.

A halfway house is a type of prison or institute intended to teach (or reteach) the necessary skills for people to re-integrate into society and better support and care for themselves. Halfway houses are typically either state sponsored for those with criminal backgrounds, or privately run for those with substance abuse issues.

As well as serving as a residence, halfway houses can provide social, medical, psychiatric, educational, and other similar services. They are termed "halfway houses" due to their being halfway between completely independent living and in-patient or incarceration facilities, where residents are highly restricted in their behavior and freedoms.

The term has been used in the United States since at least the Temperance Movement of the 1840s.

== Definitional problems ==
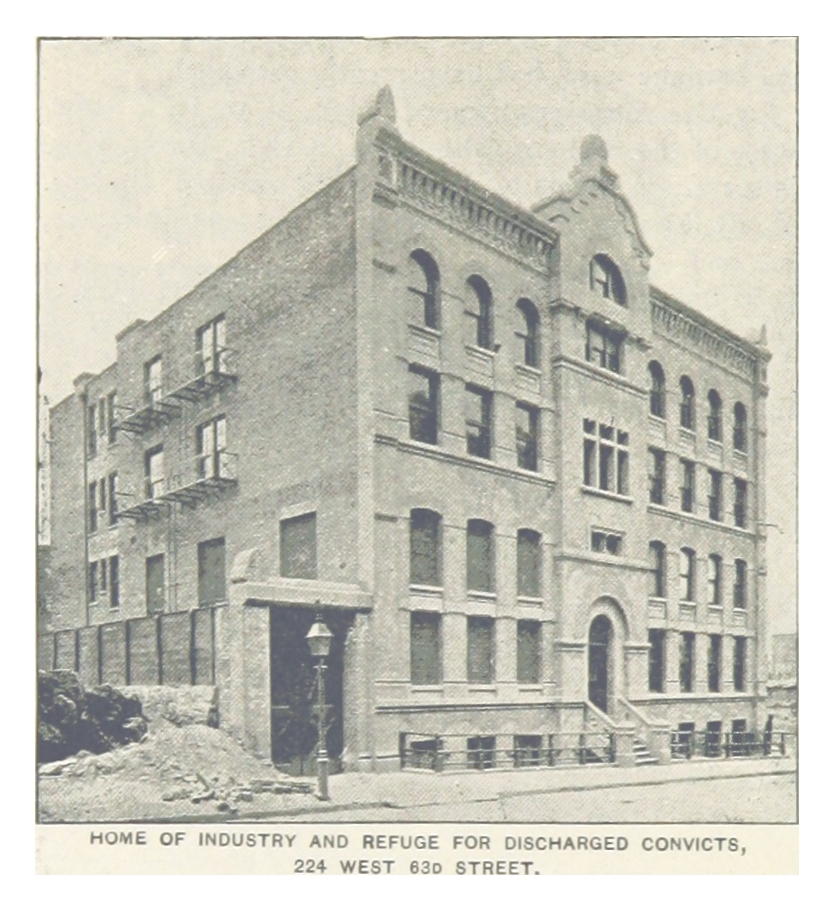
Home of Industry and Refuge for Discharged Convicts, New York City in the 1890s

There are several different types of halfway houses. Some are state sponsored, while others (mainly addiction recovery homes and mental illness homes) are run by "for profit" entities. In criminology the purpose of a halfway house is generally considered to be that of allowing people to begin the process of reintegration with society, while still providing monitoring and support. This type of living arrangement is often believed to reduce the risk of recidivism or relapse when compared to a straight release directly into society.

Some halfway houses are meant solely for reintegration of persons who have been recently released from prison or jail; some are meant for people with chronic mental health disorders; others are for people with substance abuse issues, generally called sober living houses. The state-placement of ex-criminal offenders to a "halfway house" after a prison sentence may either be decided upon as part of the judge's sentence or by a prison official's recommendation. A direct sentence to a halfway house can also be decided upon by a judge or prosecutor in lieu of prison time.

== National differences ==
=== United States ===
The majority of programs in the United States make a distinction between a halfway house and a sober/recovery house. A halfway house has an active rehabilitation treatment program run throughout the day, where the residents receive intensive individual and group counseling for their substance abuse while they establish a sober support network, secure new employment, and find new housing. Residents stay for one to six months.

Residents of work release housing are frequently required to pay rent on a "sliding scale" which is often dependent on whether or not they can find a job while in residence. In addiction-recovery houses, a resident's stay is sometimes financed by health insurance. In addition, a stay in a recovery house might be a partial requirement of a criminal sentence. Residents are normally asked to remain sober and comply with a recovery program.

In certain areas, a halfway house is much different from a recovery house or sober house. In these areas, a drug and alcohol halfway house is licensed by the Department of Health and has staff coverage 24 hours a day. This staff includes a clinical treatment team.

=== United Kingdom ===
In the United Kingdom, "halfway house" can refer to a place where people with mental disorders, victims of child abuse, orphans, or teenage runaways stay. The latter are often run by charities, including the Church of England, other churches, and community groups. Residential places for offenders on bail are known as bail hostels, and probation-supervised accommodation for offenders post-release are known as Approved Premises. However, the expression halfway house more usually refers to something combining features of two other things, for example a solution to a problem based on two ideas.

=== Canada ===
In Canada, halfway houses are often called Community-Based Residential Facilities. The Correctional Service of Canada definition of a halfway house is similar to the general American definition of one.

== Programming integrity ==
With regard to programming integrity, findings regarding the ability of transitional housing to reduce recidivism or help addiction recovery have been mixed. Many criminologists have conducted research of halfway house facilities that provide housing for low risk criminals after institutionalization. Risk screening for residents is considered essential in order to preserve both institutional and community safety.

== NIMBY effect ==
Residents of neighborhoods in which halfway houses attempt to locate often oppose their establishment. Social justice literature observes the relationships between halfway house siting and the NIMBY (Not In My Back Yard) phenomenon. Some communities/neighborhoods may have the ability to affect political legislation through political solidarity while others may not. Some research stresses that community residents simply feel nervous when halfway houses are sited near them. Others point out that the presence of transitional residences may pose real hazards to community safety. NIMBY research suggests that a neighborhood's resistance to placement may be linked to class-based prejudices about ex-offenders and drug addicts. Kraft & Clary (1991) argue that NIMBY responses are sometimes associated with mistrust of government sponsors.

== See also ==
- Almshouse
- Deinstitutionalisation
- Exodus (transitional housing)
- Hostel
- Poorhouse
- Prisoner reentry
- Sober living houses
- Types of drug rehabilitation treatment
