= Church World Service =

Network of charities with headquarters

- Founded: January 1, 1946; 80 years ago
- Type: Humanitarian aid
- Website: https://cwsglobal.org

Church World Service (CWS), founded in 1946, is a United States-based non-governmental organization cooperative ministry of 37 Christian denominations and communions, providing sustainable self-help, development, disaster response, and refugee assistance around the world. The CWS mission is to eradicate hunger and poverty and to promote peace and justice at the national and international level through collaboration with global partners.

== Program areas ==
Disaster response

When disaster strikes, CWS works with partners on the scene to provide shelter, food and water, blankets, recovery kits, counseling – the basics needed to ensure the survival of individuals and communities at risk. In addition to rapid emergency disaster response, CWS also provides long-term development initiative, helping vulnerable families and communities prepare for and recover from natural and human-caused calamities. For example, in drought-ridden Ethiopia, CWS and partners are assisting 120,000 people with food and seeds to restart farming activities.

In the United States, when disaster strikes, CWS dispatches disaster response specialists where needed in order to provide assistance to local interfaith groups assessing and responding to the material and spiritual needs of their communities. After Hurricanes Ike and Gustav hit the U.S. Gulf Coast, CWS reached out to its network of long-term recovery groups for project development support and also for provision of material resources such as CWS Blankets and Kits. Since Hurricanes Katrina and Rita, CWS has partnered with Habitat for Humanity and has invested in building long-term recovery capacity along the Gulf Coast. As a result of this collaboration more than 640 houses were repaired or rebuilt in the targeted area of the Gulf Coast.

Refugee assistance

CWS helps meet the needs of refugees in protracted situations and those who are able to return home. It also serves tens of thousands of refugees, immigrants, and asylum seekers in the U.S. and around the world each year with screening for potential resettlement to the U.S., chaplaincy, legal, and other professional services. Working with denominations and congregational co-sponsors, CWS and its network of resettlement affiliates have welcomed and found new homes in the U.S. for more than 450,000 refugees since 1946.

Immigration

CWS strongly supports comprehensive immigration reform and argued in 2014 that Congress "should enact immigration reform that will provide a permanent solution and a path to citizenship for all our undocumented community members."

CROP Hunger Walks

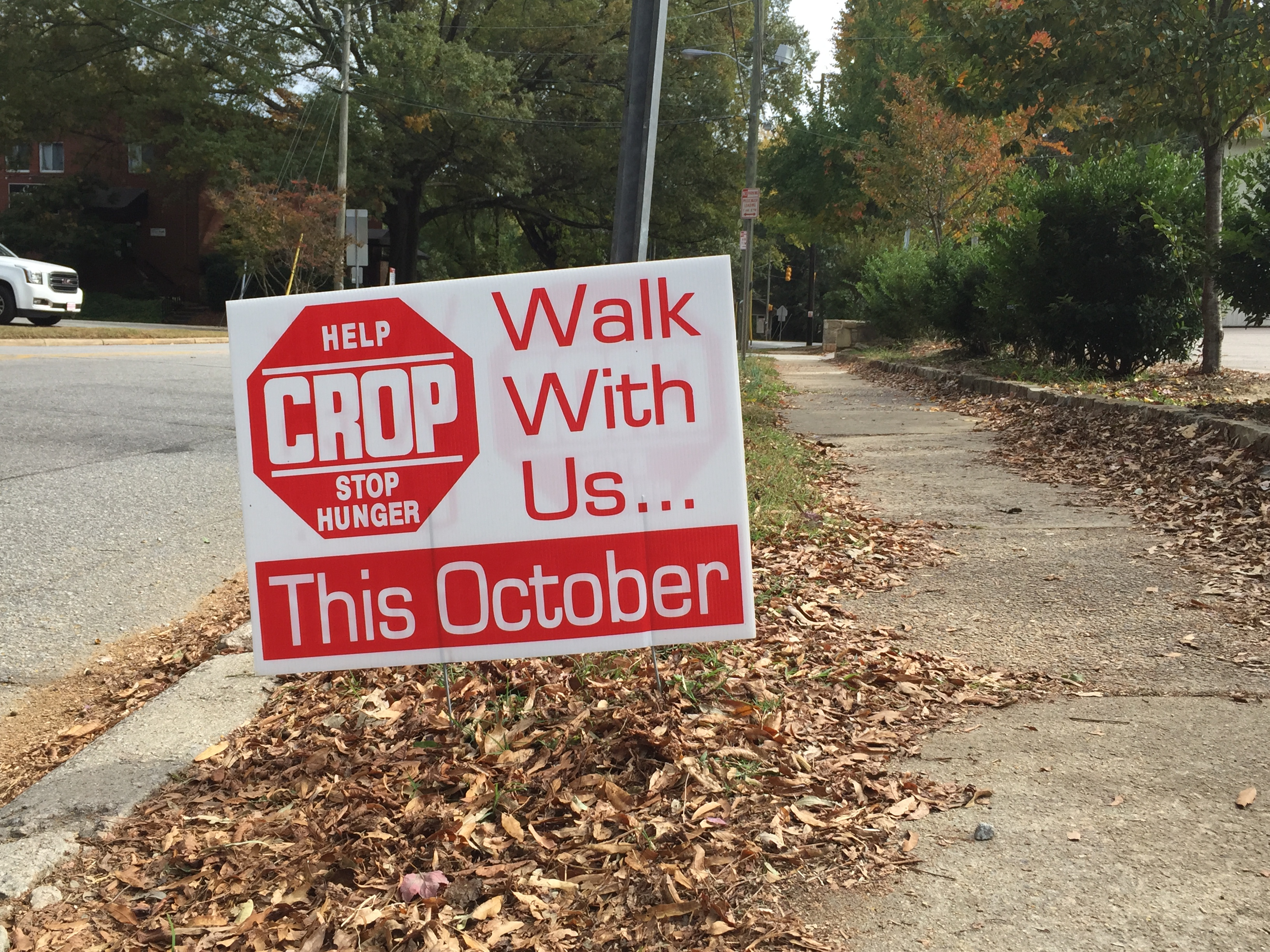
Raleigh CROP Hunger Walk 2015

The largest fund-raising events for Church World Service are CROP Hunger Walks (Christian Rural Overseas Program). The first CROP Hunger Walk was in the 1960s. Now more than 2,000 communities across the U.S. join in CROP Hunger Walks each year. A unique aspect of CROP Hunger Walks is that Church World Service does not receive all of the money raised. Up to 25% of the money donated is given to local hunger fighting agencies which include food banks and community gardens. Additionally, those sponsoring a walker can specify whether Church World Service or an alternative global hunger-fighting agency will receive the remaining 75% of the donation.

Blankets+

Through the Blankets+ program, more than 8,000 congregations and groups enable CWS to respond to disasters and assist communities by providing the necessary tools needed to build sustainable lives.

CWS Kits

CWS Kits include hygiene kits, school kits, baby kits, and emergency clean-up buckets. Last year, with the support of affiliated congregations and religious groups, CWS provided 298,000 Kits in the United States and abroad.

Church World Service earned a B+ rating from the American Institute of Philanthropy and was also named one of the Top 100 Highly Rated Charities by GiveSpot.com. CWS currently has a 4-star rating from Charity Navigator.

On August 26, 2009 CWS was part of the 300+ Groups Ask Senate for Stronger Climate Bill letter to Senate.

== Participating churches and organizations ==
The member communions:

- African Methodist Episcopal Church
- African Methodist Episcopal Zion Church
- Alliance of Baptists
- American Baptist Churches USA
- Diocese of the Armenian Church of America (including Diocese of California)
- Christian Church (Disciples of Christ)
- Christian Methodist Episcopal Church
- Church of the Brethren
- Coptic Orthodox Church in North America
- Ecumenical Catholic Communion
- Episcopal Church in the United States of America
- Evangelical Lutheran Church in America
- Friends United Meeting
- Greek Orthodox Archdiocese of America
- Hungarian Reformed Church in America
- International Council of Community Churches
- Korean Presbyterian Church in America
- Malankara Orthodox Syrian Church
- Mar Thoma Church
- Moravian Church in America
- National Baptist Convention of America, Inc.
- National Baptist Convention, USA, Inc.
- National Missionary Baptist Convention of America
- Orthodox Church in America
- Patriarchal Parishes of the Russian Orthodox Church in the U.S.A.
- Philadelphia Yearly Meeting of the Religious Society of Friend
- Polish National Catholic Church
- Presbyterian Church (U.S.A.)
- Progressive National Baptist Convention
- Reformed Church in America
- Serbian Orthodox Church in the U.S.A. and Canada
- Swedenborgian Church of North America
- Syriac Orthodox Church
- Ukrainian Orthodox Church of the USA
- United Church of Christ
- United Methodist Church

== List of local resettlement affiliates ==
The organization has more than twenty affiliate refugee and immigration offices located in seventeen states.

- Comsats Community Development Unit, Abbottabad, Pakistan
- Lutheran Social Ministry of the Southwest
- Episcopal Diocese of Los Angeles
- Opening Doors, Inc.
- Center for New Americans
- Ecumenical Refugee Services
- Integrated Refugee and Immigrant Services
- New American Pathways, Inc.
- Interfaith Refugee and Immigration Services
- Exodus Refugee Immigration
- Kentucky Refugee Ministries, Inc.
- Refugee Immigration Ministry
- Programs Assisting Refugee Acculturation
- Lutheran Immigration and Refugee Service
- Heartland Refugee Resettlement, Inc.
- Interfaith Refugee Resettlement Program
- Journey's End Refugee Services
- Catholic Family Center, Refugee Resettlement Program
- Interfaith Works of Central New York, Inc.
- Lutheran Family Services in the Carolinas
- Community Refugee & Immigration Services
- Sponsors Organized to Assist Refugees
- Bridge Refugee Services
- Refugee Services of Texas
- Interfaith Ministries for Greater Houston
- Virginia Council of Churches Refugee Resettlement Program
- Interchurch Refugee Ministries

== See also ==
- VOLAG
