= International Rescue Committee =

Nongovernmental humanitarian organization

- Logo

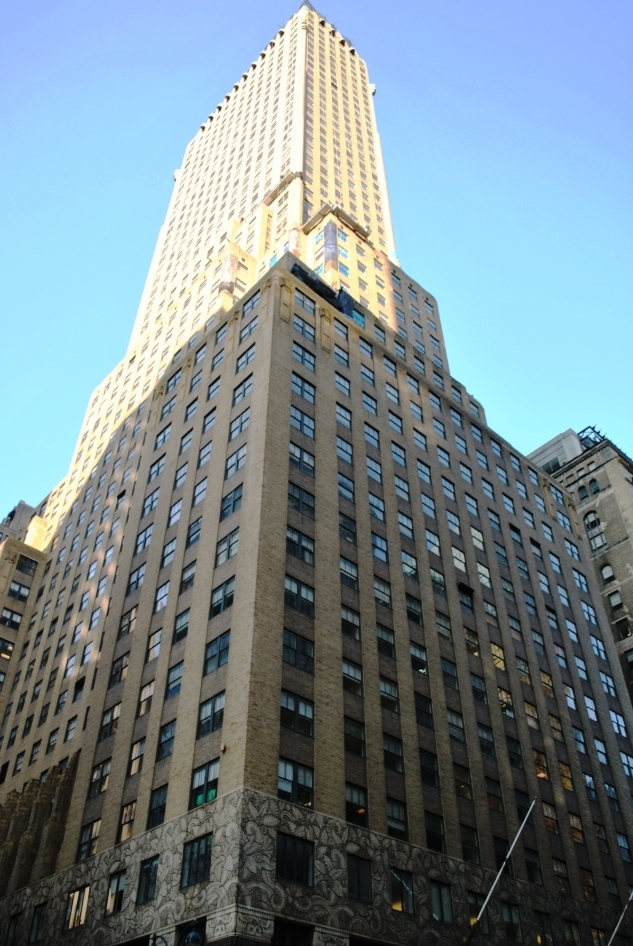
- The headquarters of the IRC are located within the Chanin Building in New York
- Abbreviation: IRC
- Predecessor: Emergency Rescue Committee & International Relief Association
- Formation: July 24, 1933; 93 years ago
- Type: Non-governmental
- Legal status: Non-profit
- Purpose: To assist people whose lives have been affected by conflict and disaster, including the climate crisis, to survive, recover, and gain control of their future
- Headquarters: New York City, U.S.
- Coordinates: 40.751377°N 73.976511°W
- Region served: Worldwide
- Services: Education, health care, relief/social services, empowerment, and safety services
- Fields: Humanitarian aid
- President: David Miliband
- Revenue: $1.579 billion (2024)
- Expenses: $1.619 billion (2024)
- Website: rescue.org
- Formerly called: International Relief and Rescue Committee

The International Rescue Committee (IRC) is a global humanitarian aid, relief, and development nongovernmental organization. It was founded in 1933 as the International Relief Association, at the request of Albert Einstein, and changed its name in 1942 after merging with the similar Emergency Rescue Committee. Today, the IRC provides emergency aid and long-term assistance to refugees and those displaced by war, persecution, or natural disaster in more than 40 countries. In cities across the U.S. and Europe, the IRC helps refugees and displaced individuals resettle and integrate into new communities.

Consisting of first responders, humanitarian relief workers, international development experts, health care providers, and educators, the IRC has assisted millions of people around the world since its founding in 1933. In 2024, the IRC reached 36.5 million people in countries affected by crisis with humanitarian services.

The IRC has received an “A” rating from CharityWatch, a four of four-star rating from Charity Navigator, and meets all 20 of BBB Wise Giving Alliance’s accountability standards.

The current president and CEO of the International Rescue Committee (IRC) is David Miliband (2013–present), who previously served as the British foreign secretary.

== History ==
The International Rescue Committee (IRC) was founded as the New York branch of the International Relief Association (which later combined with another relief organization) in 1931, at the suggestion of Albert Einstein. As of 1933, the IRC was initially an organization that helped those who were fleeing Nazi Germany and as need arose it expanded its clientele.

=== Founding ===
The International Relief Association (IRA) was founded in 1931 in Germany by two left-wing factions, the Communist Party Opposition (KPO) and the Socialist Workers Party (SAP). Its purpose was to aid victims of state oppression and persecution. After the Nazis took power in 1933, the organization moved its headquarters to Paris.

The KPO consisted of the "right opposition" – communists who had been purged by Stalin in 1929 because of their support for Nikolai Bukharin. Among those purged was Jay Lovestone, the erstwhile head of the American Communist Party. It was Lovestone who formed an American section of the International Relief Association in 1933. Among those who joined him was Albert Einstein. Its purpose was to assist Germans suffering under Adolf Hitler's regime – particularly supporters of the "right opposition". Later, refugees from Mussolini's Italy and Franco's Spain were assisted.

In 1940, European exiles and American liberals close to First Lady Eleanor Roosevelt, founded the Emergency Rescue Committee (ERC) to aid European refugees trapped in Vichy France. ERC founding member Varian Fry arrived in Marseille within a few weeks of the fall of France, where he pulled together a small team that was instrumental in helping many individuals escape Vichy and the Nazis to safety in the U.S. and elsewhere. Over 2,000 political, cultural, union and academic leaders were rescued in just 13 months, ending when Fry was expelled by the Vichy French. Fry also worked closely with British intelligence, helping to establish escape routes for British servicemen. Fry gave British intelligence a map showing the distribution of mines in the Mediterranean which he had received from a refugee.

In 1942, after the US entered the Second World War, IRA and ERC joined forces under the name International Relief and Rescue Committee, which was later shortened to the International Rescue Committee. The organization was financed largely by the National War Fund.

While historian Eric Thomas Chester writes that by the 1950s the IRC had evolved into a global operation functioning as an integral link in the CIA's covert network, becoming deeply involved in the volatile confrontations between the two superpowers, and participating in an array of sensitive clandestine operations, many other historians have taken a less polemical tone about the IRC during this period, arguing that the ‘relationship’, where one existed, was of cooperative collaboration only where goals aligned - as opposed to one of co-optation by any intelligence services.

=== Timeline ===
==== 1940s ====
In the 1940s, IRC fed people during the Soviet blockade of West Berlin. In 1945, at the end of World War II, the IRC initiated emergency relief programs, established hospitals and children's centers, and started refugee resettlement efforts in Europe. With the descent of the Iron Curtain in 1946, the IRC initiated a resettlement program for East European refugees, which continued until the end of the Cold War. In the period immediately following the end of the Second World War, the IRC was one of several organizations aiding refugees from Eastern Europe. These refugees were screened to see if they had valuable information concerning the Soviet bloc countries. A select few were recruited to participate in covert operations being conducted by the intelligence community. In 1949, the IRC took a significant step toward a greater integration into the covert network. The IRC distributed a confidential memorandum that it was prepared to take part in sensitive covert operations at the behest of the U.S. government. Only a select few within the committee would be told of these operations. From this point onward, the IRC would function on a two-pronged basis. There would be programs to assist refugees that would be transparent and, at the same time, there would be parallel operations known to only a few.

==== 1950s ====
In 1950, the IRC intensified its aid in Europe with Project Berlin, which provided food to the people of East Berlin amid increased Soviet oppression. After the war, the committee's European representatives focused on rebuilding the Social Democratic Party of Germany (SPD) as a bulwark against the Communists.

Leo Cherne, an IRC board member since 1946, was elected IRC Chairman in 1951. He would hold the position for 40 years.

Also in the 1950s, the IRC began relief and resettlement programs for refugees displaced by the North Vietnamese defeat of the French and by the Soviet forces’ crushing of the Hungarian revolution. According to historian Eric Thomas Chester, the IRC was instrumental in the establishment of two key Washington lobby groups supporting South Vietnam, the American Friends of Vietnam, and its successor, the Citizens Committee for Peace with Freedom in Vietnam.

==== 1960s ====
In 1960, an IRC resettlement program began for Cuban refugees fleeing the Castro dictatorship and for Haitian refugees escaping the Duvalier regime.

IRC operations were extended to Africa in 1962 when 200,000 Angolans fled to Zaire. Also that year, the IRC began aiding Chinese fleeing to Hong Kong from the mainland.

==== 1970s ====
The IRC was active worldwide, providing support for refugees fleeing conflict and oppression in India, Chile, Paraguay, Uruguay, Guatemala, Cambodia, Laos, Vietnam, Uganda and the Soviet Union, while resettling refugees in the United States.

==== 1980s ====
At the turn of the decade, the IRC launched emergency relief programs for Afghan refugees fleeing to Pakistan. Eight years later, the IRC started community rehabilitation activities in Afghanistan for tens of thousands of returning refugees.

During the 1982 war in Lebanon, the IRC assisted Palestinian and Lebanese refugees.

Spanish Refugee Aid, which served the survivors of the Spanish Civil War in France, became a division of the IRC in 1984. That same year, the IRC initiated health and community development projects in El Salvador for displaced victims of the civil war.

Partnering with the Polish trade union movement Solidarity in 1987, the IRC began a health care program in Poland.

Relief programs to assist Mozambican refugees in Malawi also began in 1987. Eight years later, the IRC was in Mozambique helping with their return.

In 1989, the Women's Commission for Refugee Women and Children was established by the IRC as an affiliate organization whose purpose is to serve the rights and interests of the 80% of the world's refugees who are women and children. The Women's Commission became the Women's Refugee Commission in 2009.

==== 1990s ====
After the first Gulf War, the IRC came to the aid of hundreds of thousands of Kurdish refugees who fled Saddam Hussein's regime. In 1992, the IRC began work in the former Yugoslavia, first dealing with the consequences of ethnic cleansing in Bosnia and Herzegovina and later launching community rehabilitation programs in Bosnia.

IRC became headquartered in the Chanin Building in midtown Manhattan in 1994. In the same year, the IRC set up emergency programs in Tanzania and Zaire (now the Democratic Republic of Congo) to aid refugees fleeing genocide and civil war in Rwanda.

IRC operations began inside Kosovo in 1997 and were expanded in 1999 to meet the needs of Kosovar refugees in Macedonia, Albania, Montenegro and Bosnia. Also in 1997, the IRC opened a UK office.

In 1999, the IRC launched emergency operations in East Timor.

==== 2000s ====
In 2000, the IRC launched emergency shelter, sanitation and education programs for Chechen refugees fleeing fighting between Russian forces and Ichkerian people.

Following the September 11 attacks, the IRC undertook an advocacy campaign to reverse the U.S. government's slowdown in refugee resettlement.

The IRC conducted operations across Iraq from April 2003 through December 2004. The organization resumed operations there in 2007 and launched expanded programs throughout the country. In addition to aiding displaced Iraqis within the country, the IRC also provided assistance to Iraqi refugees in Jordan and Syria, as well as to those granted refuge in the United States.

In 2003, IRC programs in West Africa expanded to serve the growing populations of refugees and displaced persons uprooted by civil conflict.

In 2005, around two decades after Burmese refugees first began crossing into Thailand, poverty and violent conflict in Myanmar's ethnic minority areas continue to drive people into camps along the border. Since its opening in 2005, by 2012 the Resettlement Support Center (formerly known as the Overseas Processing Entity) in the Thai capital Bangkok had helped 90,000 people seek admission to the United States as refugees. The Resettlement Support Center primarily assists refugees in Thailand but also assists asylum seekers in Malaysia, Singapore, Indonesia and other countries in Southeast Asia. The activities of the center are funded by the U.S. Department of State, Bureau of Population, Refugees and Migration.

The IRC worked closely with local aid organizations to respond to various disasters, including in Pakistan after the 2005 earthquake; and in Indonesia after the South Asian tsunami; and in Myanmar after the 2008 cyclone.

In 2008, the IRC released the fifth in a series of surveys demonstrating the excess loss of life in the Democratic Republic of Congo caused by the nation's long-running civil war. The fifth survey put the excess-death toll between August 1998 and April 2007 at 5.4 million.

The IRC affiliate Women's Commission for Refugee Women and Children became the Women's Refugee Commission in 2009.

==== 2010s ====
Following the Haiti earthquake in January 2010, the IRC deployed its Emergency Response Team to Haiti to deliver help to Port-au-Prince. IRC experts in emergency health, shelter and children's welfare worked with local aid groups to assist survivors.

David Miliband, former British Foreign Secretary, became the IRC president and CEO in 2013. In 2015, according to IRC it trained 15,000 farmers, gave 440,000 babies measles vaccinations, job training to 27,000 people and resettled 10,000 refugees in the United States.

In 2016, Fast Company said that IRC "might be the most under-recognized yet influential nongovernmental aid group in the world." In 2016, it had 11,000 people in it, and offices in around 40 countries. It had an annual operating budget of around $700 million. In 2016, the IRC aided around 15,000 women and girls through protection and empowerment programs in Jordan. In 2016 the IRC published the "Outcomes and Evidence Framework," an interactive tool that aims to create a framework for guiding humanitarian decision-making using theories of change and research evidence. The same year, they publicly committed to using this tool to ensure that all of their programs are evidence-based or evidence-generating by 2020 as part of the "Grand Bargain" commitments.

In July 2018, IRC was behind the Welcome Home initiative to give tours and activities for refugees in New York City and Northern California.

In 2019, the IRC in San Diego began hosting a "Refugee Film Festival" that presents documentaries about the refugee experience.

==== 2020s ====
On March 13, 2020, the second annual IRC's Refugee Film Festival in San Diego was postponed until June due to the COVID-19 pandemic.

After the Russian invasion of Ukraine in early 2022, the IRC provided support for Ukrainian refugees and civilians, both abroad and within Ukraine. The IRC provided mobile health teams and equipment capable of quickly deploying to crisis locations, supplied civilians with heating equipment such as gas stoves to keep homes warm during winter, and conducted many other efforts amid the large-scale humanitarian crisis. By September 2023, the IRC had reached more than 860,000 people in Ukraine through direct assistance and online services. As of 2024, these efforts are still ongoing.

After a report published in December 2023 the IRC has warned that humanitarian crises will worsen in 2024 due to several key factors, including climate change, worsening armed conflicts, and less international support. Africa is expected to be the region most adversely effected.

== Current work ==
The IRC is now at work in about 40 countries and in 26 U.S. cities. In 2010, notable operations included disaster response in the wake of the earthquake in Haiti, ongoing programs to address the humanitarian crisis in Congo and to help community rebuilding efforts in Afghanistan and Pakistan, and advocacy and resettlement efforts on behalf of Iraqis uprooted by the war.

In January 2025, the IRC lost dozens of grants from USAID and the State Department when the Trump Administration froze all foreign aid spending.

As of 2025, the IRC continues to respond to humanitarian crises in more than 40 countries worldwide, including in Ukraine, Gaza, and Sudan. The IRC also helps refugees and displaced individuals resettle and integrate into new communities across the U.S. and Europe.

=== Democratic Republic of the Congo ===
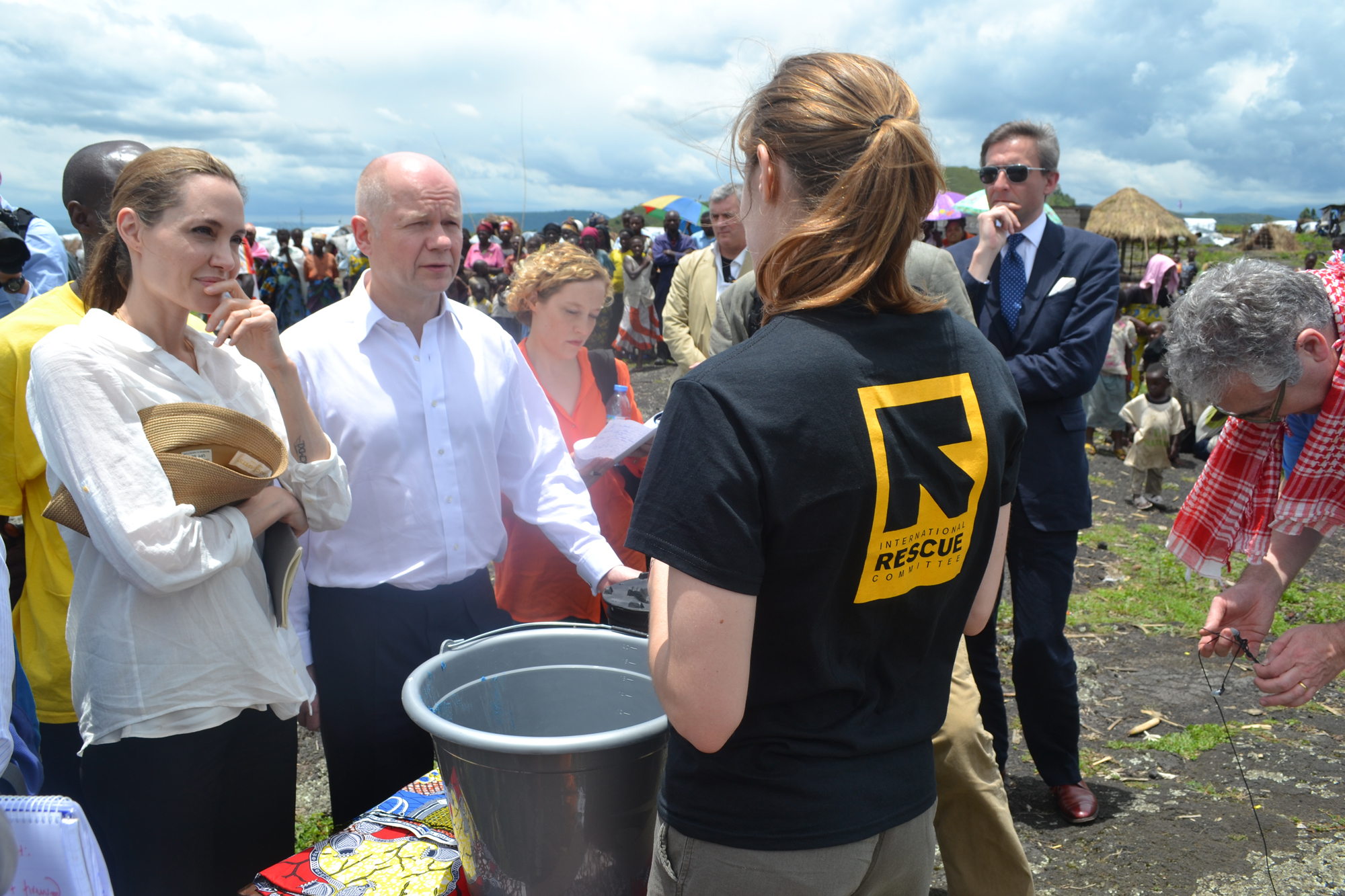
Foreign Secretary William Hague and UNHCR Special Envoy Angelina Jolie at Nzolo displacement camp, near Goma, eastern Democratic Republic of Congo, 25 March 2013, meeting refugees and the International Rescue Committee

The IRC is one of the largest providers of humanitarian assistance in the DRC, where conflict and humanitarian crisis have taken the lives of 5.4 million people since 1998, according to peer-reviewed studies by the IRC. The organization runs programs dedicated to health, education, civil society development, emergency response and reducing gender-based violence, in seven Congolese provinces. As rape and other forms of sexual violence have increasingly been used as a tactic of war by militias involved in the conflict, the IRC has stepped up its sexual violence aid and protection programs. Between 2002 and 2018, the IRC has provided medical care, counseling and economic support services to about 40,000 women and girls who have survived sexual violence in Congo.

The IRC is at the origin of a controversial estimate of the excess mortality in the DRC due to conflicts following the genocide of Tutsis in Rwanda. According to the IRC at first, the excess mortality was estimated at 3.8 million deaths. This estimate was challenged by a group of Belgian demographers sent to the DRC by a European institution to help draw up electoral lists for the DRC. For cross-checking purposes, they made a study of the excess mortality in the DRC over the period 1998–2004 which came to 183,000 deaths, twenty times less.

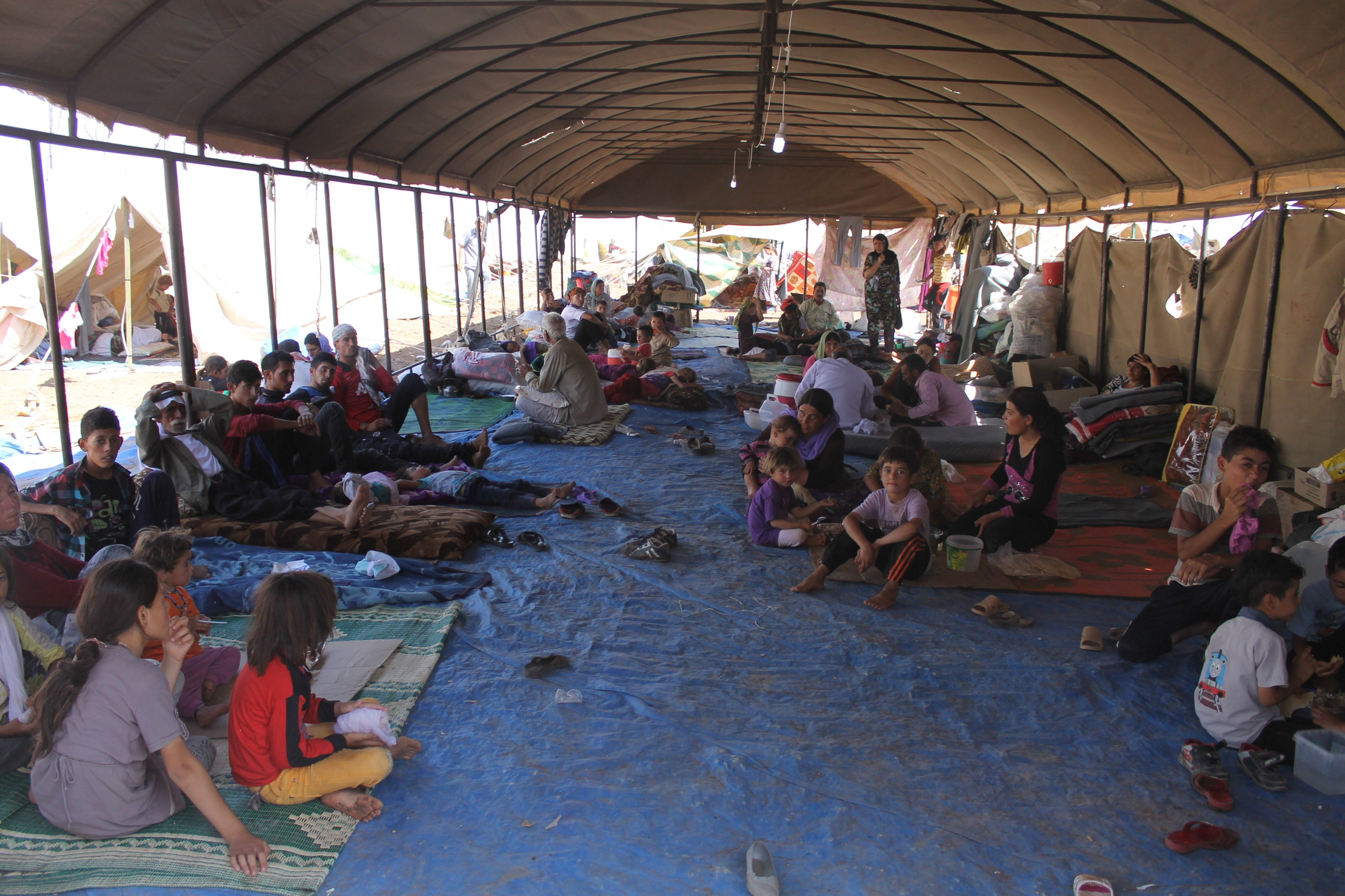
Yazidi refugees from Iraq receive aid from the IRC at Newroz camp, Syria, 13 August 2014

== Operations ==
The IRC delivers a number of services, including emergency response, health care, programs fighting gender-based violence, post-conflict development projects, children and youth protection and education programs, water and sanitation systems, strengthening the capacity of local organizations, and supporting civil society and good-governance initiatives.

For refugees afforded sanctuary in the United States, IRC resettlement offices across the country provide a range of assistance aimed at helping new arrivals settling, adjusting and acquiring the skills to become self-sufficient.

The IRC operates in over 40 countries across Africa, Asia, Europe, Latin America, the Middle East, and the United States.

=== Emergency response ===
The IRC maintains an Emergency Response Team of 17 specialists who assess survival needs and mount responses to sudden or protracted emergencies.

The team includes coordinators, logisticians, doctors, and water and sanitation experts. It also includes specialists who focus on human rights protection, the special needs of children in crisis, the prevention of sexual violence, and aid for rape survivors.

Emergency Response Team members remain on standby to deploy to a crisis within 72 hours, whether they are launching new relief efforts or lending support to IRC teams already on the ground. Equipment and supplies are pre-positioned in key transport hubs so that the materials can be dispatched anywhere in the world on short notice. The IRC also maintains a kit with inventory necessary for the startup of an emergency program in a remote location, as well as a roster of IRC employees and qualified external personnel who are available on short notice for emergency deployment.

Recent IRC Emergency Response Team deployments include Darfur, Indonesia after the South Asian tsunami, Myanmar after the 2008 cyclone, and Haiti after the 2010 earthquake.

=== Health programs ===
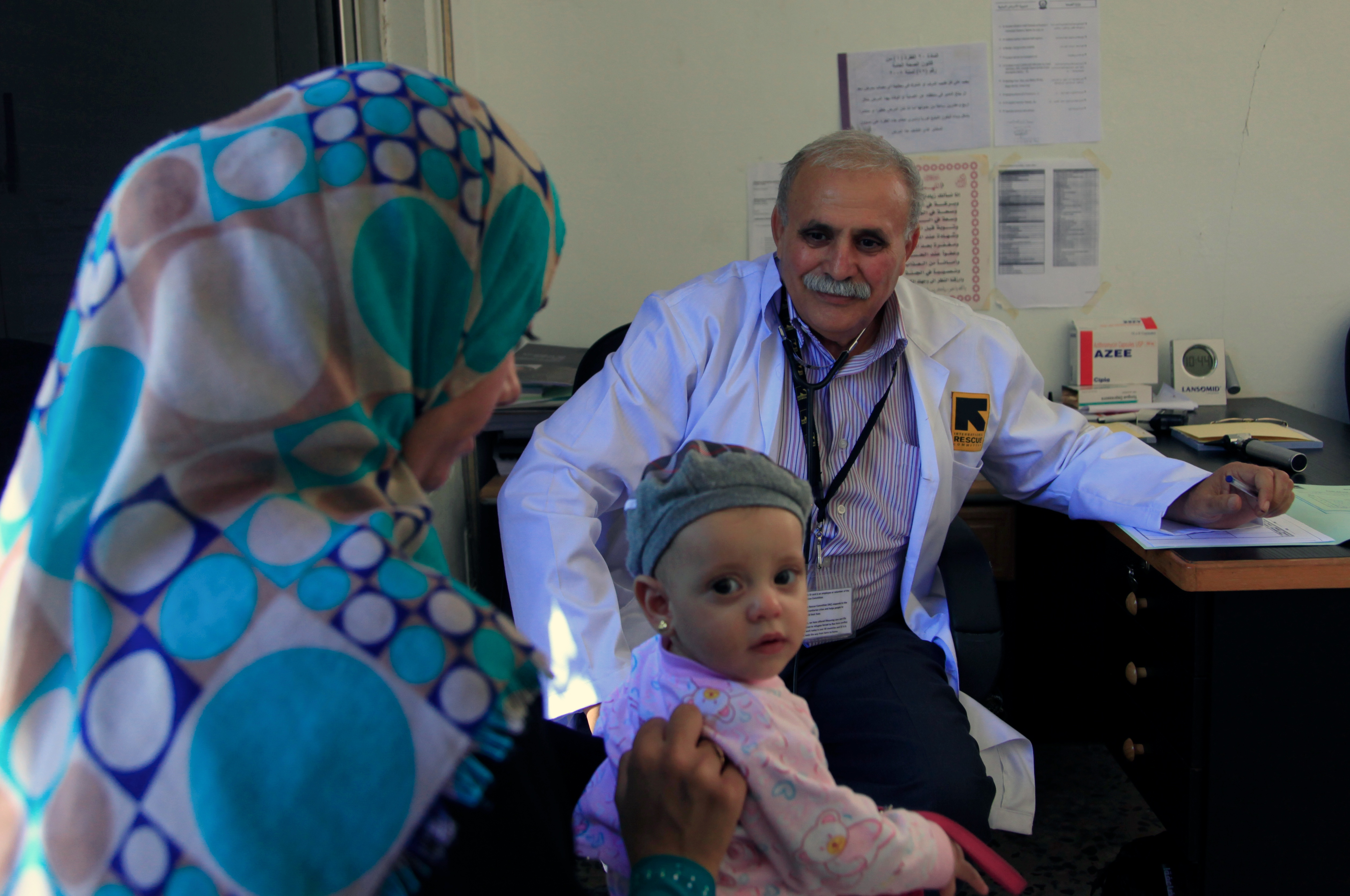
An IRC doctor conducting a check-up on a young Syrian refugee, Ramtha, Jordan, 28 August 2013

During emergencies, the IRC endeavors to rapidly reduce illness and death rates to normal levels. When the conflict subsides, the IRC works with displaced individuals and communities to rebuild their health systems.

IRC health programs assist approximately 13 million people in 25 countries, focusing on primary health care, reproductive health care, environmental health, child survival, blindness treatment and prevention, and assistance for victims of sexual violence.

The IRC works in various settings such as in refugee camps, in disaster-stricken areas and in host countries where refugees have resettled after a conflict.

=== Gender-based anti-violence programs ===
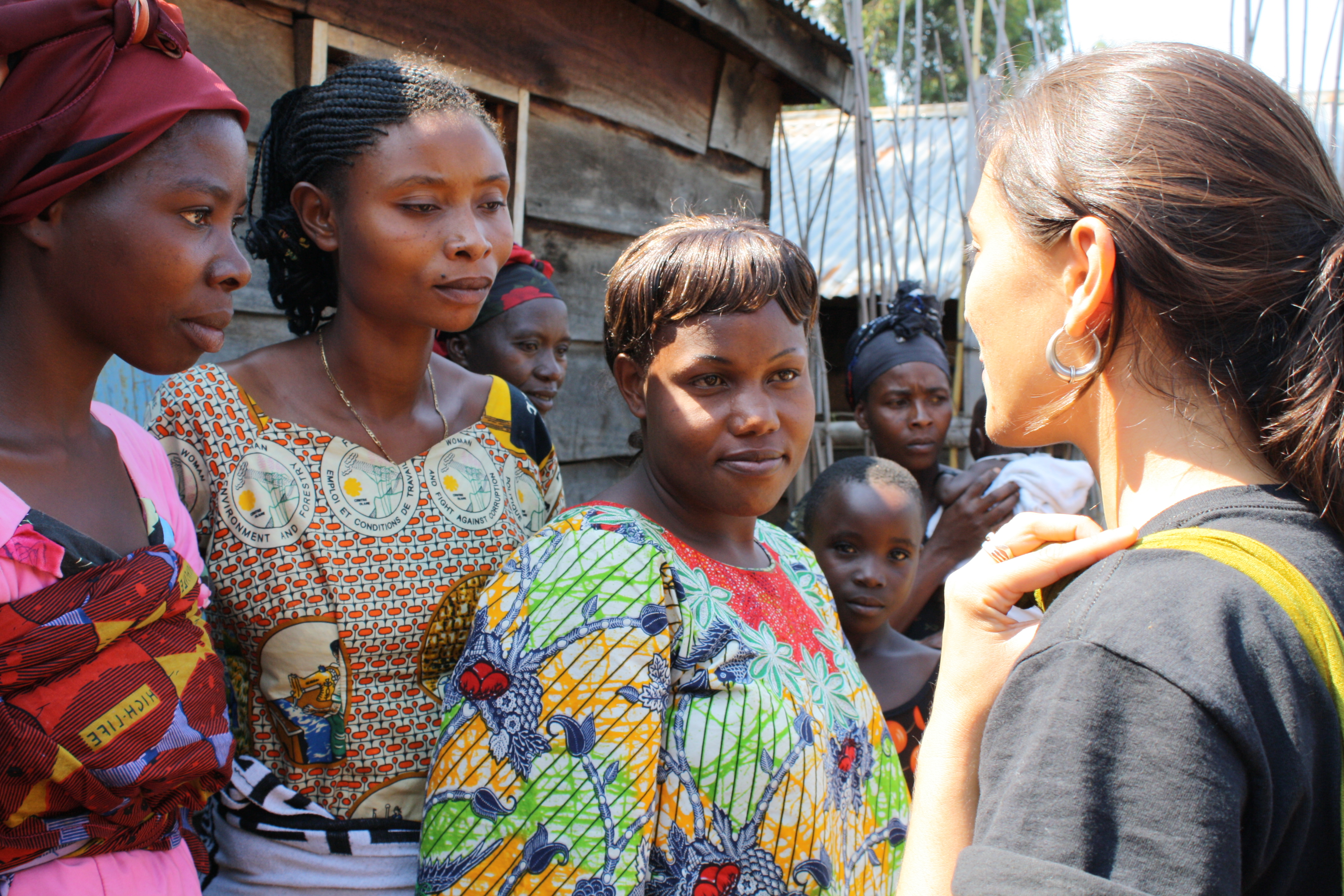
IRC psychosocial workers help rape survivors access services, South Kivu, Democratic Republic of the Congo, 11 June 2010

Gender-based violence is any harm perpetrated against a person based on power inequalities resulting from gender roles. The overwhelming majority of cases involve women and girls. The IRC's gender-based anti-violence programs aim to meet the safety, health, psychosocial and justice needs of women and girls who are survivors of or vulnerable to gender-based violence. In partnership with communities and institutions, the IRC works to empower communities to lead efforts that challenge beliefs, attitudes, and behaviors that perpetuate or condone violence against women and girls.

IRC programs implement and support social work services to help individual survivors of gender-based violence, economic empowerment activities to support survivors of violence and women and girls at-risk of violence, community education and mobilization projects around gender-based violence, training and capacity-building for NGOs and governments, coordination of humanitarian services, and advocacy efforts to advance laws preventing violence against women, and the enforcement of policies ensuring survivors’ access to care and legal justice.

=== Post-conflict development ===
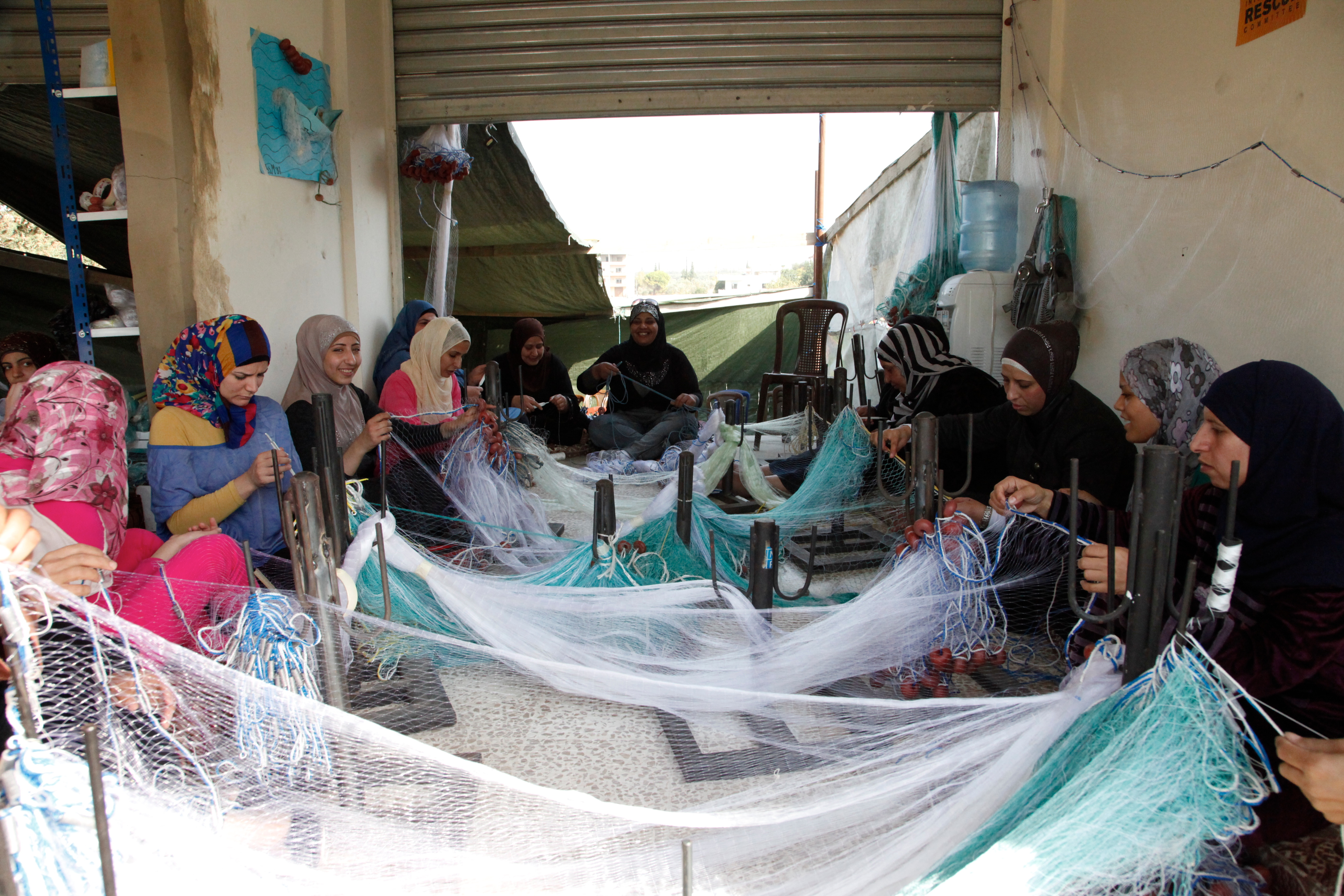
A group of women learning to create a fishing net via an IRC program, Northern Lebanon, 6 November 2013

The IRC assists with post-conflict recovery by supporting conflict-impacted communities and countries in their transition to sustainable peace and development.

In addition to the provision of humanitarian assistance, IRC post-conflict development projects aim to restore and strengthen physical and social institutions, as well as rebuild and restore social cohesion.

Program areas include social programs emphasizing rebuilding the health, public infrastructure and education sectors; gender-based violence programs; economic recovery and development programs; and governance programs that support civil society, enhance protection and the rule of law, and rebuild ties between governments and their constituencies.

=== Programs for children ===
In 2016, the IRC and its partners helped provide over 1.5 million children with access to educational opportunities. The IRC promotes the protection and development of children and youth from the early stages of an emergency through post-conflict and recovery. Its children's and youth programs include emergency care; formal and non-formal education; rehabilitation and community reintegration of former child soldiers; psychosocial care and protection; life skills training, recreational and cultural activities; and economic and leadership development for youth.

=== Resettling refugees ===
The IRC's 22 regional offices help to resettle newly arrived refugees in the U.S. and provide various services to refugees, asylees and victims of human trafficking.

Resettlement services include providing immediate aid, including food and shelter; assisting with job placement and employment skills; and giving access to clothing, medical attention, education, English-language classes and community orientation.

In addition to integrating refugees into the U.S., the IRC also provides immigration services to refugees and people who have been granted asylum, as well as specialized services to victims of human trafficking in the U.S.

=== Advocacy ===
The IRC seeks to focus the attention of policy makers on humanitarian crises and the needs of refugees, internally displaced people and other victims of conflict.

Its annual Freedom Award recognizes "extraordinary contributions to the cause of refugees and human freedom".

The IRC spearheaded a campaign urging the United States to pass the International Violence Against Women Act, which has been introduced into several sessions of Congress but as of 2023 never passed. The organization has also advocated for the United States to complete ratification of the UN Convention on the Rights of the Child; 196 nations (including the United States) have signed the convention; the United States is the only UN nation which has not ratified it.

== Organization ==
The current president and CEO of the IRC is David Miliband, formerly British Foreign Secretary.

Miliband's predecessor as president was George Erik Rupp, a former president of Columbia University and of Rice University. It was announced on 27 March 2013 that Miliband would succeed Rupp in September 2013.

The organization is governed by an unpaid board of directors, and lists, under the heading of "Overseers", individuals described as providing counsel to the board on matters of policy, fundraising and advocacy; the several score listed in early 2017 include Madeleine Albright, Kofi Annan, Tom Brokaw, Henry Kissinger, Colin Powell, and Liv Ullmann.

In addition to its New York headquarters, the IRC also has offices in approximately 40 countries and 27 U.S. cities, as well as European offices in London, Berlin, Bonn, Geneva, Stockholm and Brussels.

As of June 2018, the IRC had over 11,000 staff members.

The IRC has generally been awarded high marks by charity watchdog groups and major publications for the efficient use of its financial support and the effectiveness of its work. The American Institute of Philanthropy gives the IRC an A rating; the Forbes Investment Guide named the IRC one of 10 gold star charities, and in its 2009 review of American charities, Forbes magazine gave the IRC high ratings for program and fundraising efficiency, however, in 2020 Forbes dropped IRC to 48th in its top 100 list; Charity Navigator gave the IRC its top rating of four stars every year from 2006 to 2018 (but has downgraded them to three stars for 2019, likely due to a new, less transparent, donor privacy policy); and the Better Business Bureau Wise Giving Alliance reports that the IRC meets all of its 20 Standards for Charity Accountability.

In March 2021, the U.S. Attorney for the District of Columbia fined the International Rescue Committee $6.9 million pursuant to the False Claims Act. The government alleged the IRC failed to maintain adequate oversight over procurement in Turkey for humanitarian assistance to refugees in Syria. Bid-rigging, kickbacks, and other procurement fraud resulted in overcharging the United States Agency for International Development (USAID).

== Finances ==
As of 2019, the IRC reportedly held $224,275,287 in net assets, with funding coming from private and institutional donors. U.S. government funding of the IRC's programs originates from the Office of Foreign Disaster Assistance (OFDA), the Bureau of Population, Refugees and Migration (BPRM), the U.S. Agency for International Development (USAID), and the Department of Health and Human Services (HHS). A breakdown of the IRC's financial report for the year 2016 shows that the largest program service investment was in health services, which absorbed 38% of the IRC's funds for the year. According to Charity Navigator, in 2019, more than 87 cents of every $1 received by IRC went to programs and services that directly affected their clientele.

== Reports ==
- The IRC issued a report in 2008 detailing the plight of Iraqi refugees on the five-year anniversary of the U.S.-led occupation of Iraq.
- The next year, the organization followed up with a report on the plight of Iraqi refugees in the United States. The report argued that while "resettlement continues to be a critical and lifesaving intervention for thousands of at-risk Iraqi refugees who are living in precarious conditions in exile and unable to return home safely…the federal program no longer meets the basic needs of today’s newly arriving refugees and requires urgent reform."
- In 2010, the IRC's Commission on Iraqi Refugees issued a third report on displaced Iraqis entitled, "A Tough Road Home: Uprooted Iraqis in Jordan, Syria and Iraq." The report asserted that Iraqis are trapped in poverty and uncertainty and their needs are growing more acute, even as international attention and assistance wanes. The IRC's recommendations included increasing aid for the displaced, intensifying efforts to create conditions that would enable people to go home safely and accelerating resettlement for those who cannot go back.
- In a series of five mortality surveys between 2000 and 2007, the IRC documented the impact of the crisis in the Democratic Republic of Congo. The most recent report estimated that 5.4 million people had died from conflict-related causes in Congo since 1998, and that 2.1 million of those deaths occurred after the formal end of the war in 2002. These statistics are often cited by media and nongovernmental agencies reporting on the humanitarian crisis in Congo.
- Each year, the IRC publishes its Emergency Watchlist which highlights the 20 countries most at risk of new or worsened humanitarian emergencies.

== See also ==
- Women's Refugee Commission
- Lost Boys of Sudan
- Varian Fry
- VOLAG
