= Refugee Immigration Ministry =

US non-profit organization

- Founded: 1986
- Type: 501(c)(3) non-profit
- Purpose: asylees, asylum seekers
- Location: 6 Pleasant Street, Suite 612, Malden, Massachusetts
- Website: www.r-i-m.net

The Refugee Immigration Ministry is an interfaith, community-based organization that was founded in 1986. It is a 501(c)(3) non-profit based in Malden, Massachusetts, that serves asylum seekers, asylees, and refugees. RIM is part of a national and local network. RIM's volunteers, many who are organized in community Clusters, help integrate clients into their communities through job preparation programs, chaplaincy services to immigrant detainees, and other forms of assistance.

Each client must be legally and medically cleared prior to acceptance in RIM's programs. RIM does not provide funds for clients to send overseas. Ninety-three percent of proceeds from fundraising are used directly for client care and program costs. Only seven percent is used for administrative expenses and the maintenance of general operations, far below the national accepted average.

== Programs ==
=== Community Outreach Program (Clusters) ===
Clusters are made up of representatives from several congregations in a given community that agree to work on a cooperative, interfaith process that offers clients community-based support. Participating congregations include: Lutheran, Episcopal, United Presbyterian, United Methodist, American Baptist, Roman Catholic, United Church of Christ, Unitarian, Baháʼí, Jewish, Buddhist, Sikh, Hindu, Muslim and the Society of Friends.

People seek asylum once their own government can no longer protect them from threats to their lives. When these displaced individuals arrive, they are free to begin their lives, but often lack the resources to effectively do so. RIM's clusters aim to give them the tools to become self-sustaining members of their communities.

=== Case Management ===
All of RIM’s programs are steered by a professional Case Management plan. RIM works with clients to assess their needs and make appropriate referrals for legal services and health care. RIM provides case management services to clients placed in Clusters.

=== Job Preparation ===
RIM trains volunteers to provide ESL tutoring and computer classes for clients that are seeking employment or waiting for work authorization.

==== English as a Second Language Classes ====
Volunteers are trained to tutor clients in English using the Direct Method. Most of the clients are residents of Malden.

=== Spiritual Care Givers ===
RIM’s first program, composed of visiting immigrant detainees in the custody of the U.S. Immigration and Customs Enforcement (ICE). Spiritual Care Givers are from many cultures, speak many languages, and go into the facilities to listen. By offering spiritual care in the detention facilities, those who have been forgotten and are isolated by language are shown that the community has not forgotten.

RIM has trained over 80 people to be Spiritual Care Givers. They see an average of 50 persons per month through their visitation in several New England facilities. The training is offered annually and includes: active listening skills, prison culture, orientation to ICE, culture shock, trauma and legal issues. This training process has been shared across the country at the request of the Church World Service in Tuscan, Arizona, New York, New York, Miami, Florida, and Batavia, New York. Each volunteer is supported by monthly group supervision and individual debriefing.

The Spiritual Care Givers program has been selected by the Detention Watch Network to become the model for the country for this kind of volunteer chaplaincy program. RIM has trained over 80 people to be Spiritual Care Givers. They see an average of 50 persons per month through their visitation in several New England facilities.

== Recognition ==
This program has been recognized by the United Nations High Commissioner for Refugees as a model alternative to detention for asylum seekers. RIM has worked closely with ICE to develop a chaplaincy program for those in detention and removal proceedings. This program has had wide support in the Boston area.

The Boston Theological Institute and the Massachusetts Funeral Directors Association awarded its Annual Humanitarian Award to RIM’s Executive Director, Ruth H. Bersin.

RIM’s Executive Director was awarded the Chime Award in 2009 for humanitarian service.
