= Purappadu =

Purappadu (lit. 'Exodus') may refer to:

- Purappadu (1983 film) Indian Malayalam language film directed by Rajeevnath
- Purappadu (1990 film) Indian Malayalam language film directed by Jeassy

== See also ==
- Exodus (disambiguation)
