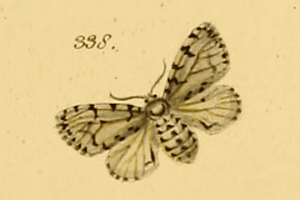

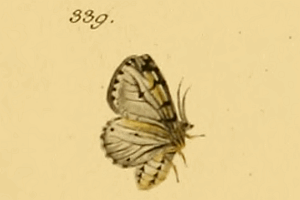

Scientific classification
- Kingdom: Animalia
- Phylum: Arthropoda
- Clade: Pancrustacea
- Class: Insecta
- Order: Lepidoptera
- Superfamily: Noctuoidea
- Family: Erebidae
- Subfamily: Arctiinae
- Genus: Diaphora
- Species: D. luctuosa

Binomial name
- Diaphora luctuosa (Hübner, 1831)

Synonyms
- Bombyx luctuosa Geyer, [1831]; Cycnia luctuosa; Arctia lugubris Herrich-Schäffer, [1844]; Spilosoma luctuosa djamila Schawerda, 1910; Spilosoma luctuosa djamila f. janeckoi Schawerda, 1910

= Diaphora luctuosa =

Species of moth

Diaphora luctuosa is a moth of the family Erebidae. It was described by Jacob Hübner in 1831. It is found in the Alps, on the Balkan Peninsula and in the Black Sea region.

The wingspan is 26–31 mm.

The larvae feed on various low-growing plants.
