= Exodus Refugee Immigration =

US-based nonprofit organization

Coordinates: 39.767375°N 86.119986°W

Exodus Refugee Immigration is a refugee resettlement agency located in Indianapolis, Indiana. Exodus programs focus on receiving refugees as they arrive in the United States, helping them find apartments and jobs, learning English, and becoming financially self-sufficient. It has resettled refugees from Burma, Democratic Republic of Congo, Syria, Central African Republic, Afghanistan, Central African Republic, Eritrea, Iraq, Somalia, and El Salvador, among other countries, and assists people of from many countries, cultures, languages, faiths, and political opinions.

Exodus Refugee Immigration only resettles people who have been granted refugee status by the United Nations and who have been vetted and pre-approved by the United States Government, which issues them valid refugee visas. It is affiliated with a national VOLAGs, Church World Service (CWS), which is assigned by the US Government's Office of Refugee Resettlement, which also provides funds for initial resettlement. These funds are channeled through the VOLAGs into local resettlement agencies such as Exodus, who provide short-term assistance with housing, employment services, ESL and financial services to the incoming refugees.

Refugees resettled by Exodus are assisted by local welcome teams, made up of volunteers from religious organizations and other community groups. These welcome teams help refugees complete required medical exams, enroll their children in schools, and learn English.

== Mission statement ==
Exodus Refugee Immigration works with refugees—worldwide victims of persecution, injustice and war—to establish self-sufficient lives in freedom and sanctuary for themselves and their families in Indiana.

== See also ==
- Refugee
- Chin people
- Karen people
