= Vakhtang Jajanidze =

Georgian film director and screenwriter (born 1987)

- Born: Vakhtang Jajanidze; 16 July 1987 (age 38); Chiatura, Georgia
- Occupation(s): Film director, screenwriter
- Years active: 2010 – present

Vakhtang Jajanidze (Georgian: ვახო ჯაჯანიძე; July 16, 1987) is a Georgian film director and screenwriter. He studied in Shota Rustaveli Theatre and Film University.

== Biography ==
Jajanidze was born in 1987 in Chiatura, Georgia. He graduated from the Faculty of International Business and Law at Ivane Javakhishvili State University in 2010. He continued studying in Shota Rustaveli Theatre and Film University. He made his first student short film in 2010, when he was at the first grade of studying, at age 23.

Jajanidze made several short documentaries between 2010 and 2015 years. His most successful film was Exodus (გამოსვლა), which was screened at many short or major film festivals, including the Tbilisi International Film Festival and Filmfest Dresden. Exodus is the story of two middle-aged sisters, Tatiana and Lili, who live in a small Georgian town.

== Filmography ==
=== Short films ===
- Exodus (2015)
- Tbilisi from Dawn till Dusk (2013)
- Once in a Park (2012)
- From Monday till Monday (2012)
- Short Film on the Declaration of Human Rights (2011)
- Students' Expedition in Tao-Klarjeti (2011)
- I (2010)
