= Exodus (2015 film) =

- Directed by: Vakhtang Jajanidze
- Written by: Vakhtang Jajanidze
- Produced by: Lasha Khalvashi
- Cinematography: Sandro Visotski
- Distributed by: Studio Artizm
- Release date: 22 November 2015 (Tbilisi)
- Running time: 15 minutes
- Country: Georgia
- Language: Georgian

Exodus is a 2015 Georgian short drama film directed by Vakhtang Jajanidze. It was screened in the Tbilisi International Film Festival, where it won Jury special prize.

== Cast ==
- Tatiana Bitsadze
- Lili Bitsadze

== Festival awards /selection ==
- Tbilisi Film Festival, Georgia, 2015 – Special Jury Prize
- Maine International Film Festival, USA, 2016
- Filmfest Dresden: International Short Film Festival, Germany, 2017
