= Weesp (band) =

Belarusian alternative post-metal band

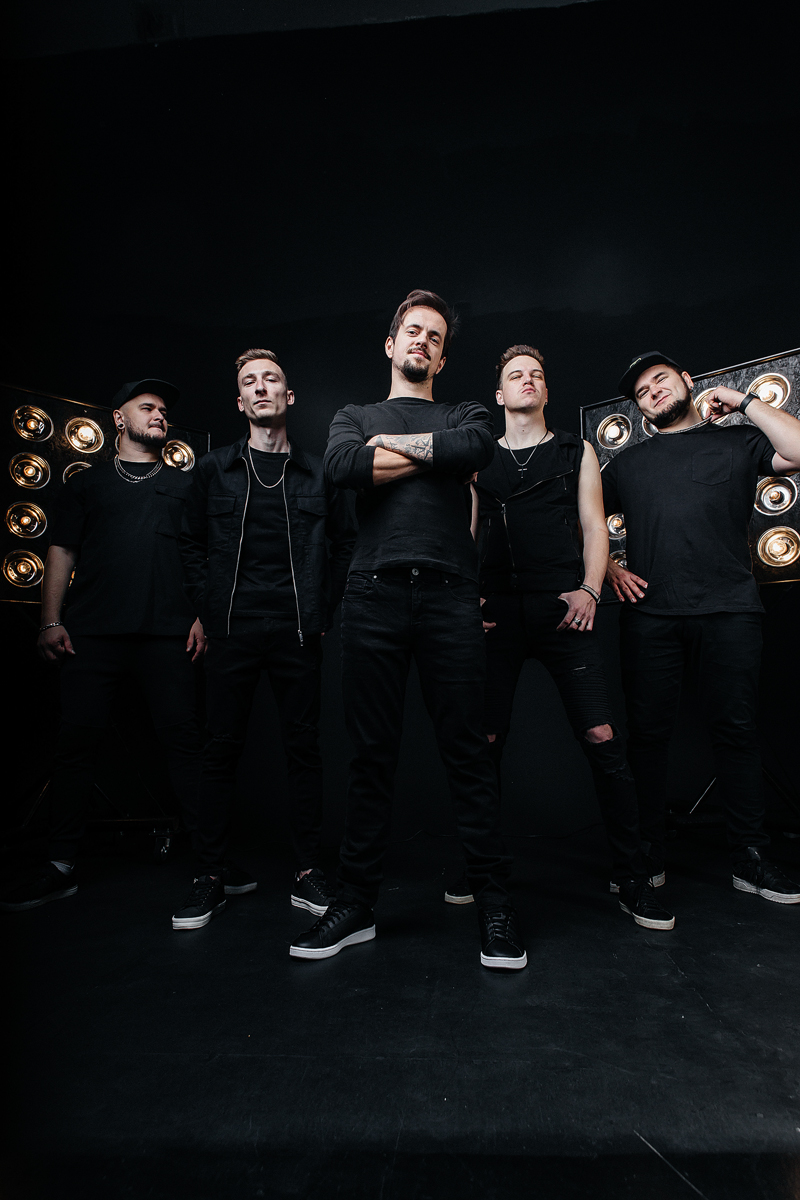

Background information
- Origin: Minsk, Belarus
- Genres: Alternative rock, electronic
- Years active: 2008–present
- Labels: DIY
- Members: Alexei Falco; Dmitry Budzko; Stanislav Budzko; Mikhail Zaluckiy; Max Sudakov
- Website: weespofficial.com

Weesp is an alternative post-metal band from Minsk, Belarus. The band style can be described as a mix of heavy and recognizable riffing, groovy drumming beats, analogue synth sounds, and melodic expressional vocals. Even though band members used to call their style alternative rock, some music journalists describe it as “combination of metal and rock genres”, and some songs they define as nu-metal.

== Early years ==
Band front man Lex Falco together with Michail (Mike) Zalucky (guitar) formed the band in Minsk when they both were studying in high school in the middle of the 2000s. Later, the rest of the members joined and, in 2009, the band finally announced its name - "WEESP" and immediately released the Taste of Steel EP]. ( Weesp is the name of a village in the Netherlands.) Inspired by such bands as The Prodigy, Nine Inch Nails, Red Hot Chili Peppers, Korn and Metallica, they formed their own sound: a combination of heavy riffs with melodic and classic synth sounds.

After the next EP release This will destroy us (2011), Weesp performed at concerts and festivals.

== 2015 - The Void ==
On 20 August 2015, Weesp released their first full album The Void on which they had been working from 2012). The recording had been postponed for a long time. According to frontman, Lex Falco the “album reflects feelings and experience from the last 10 years of our lives. This is why the sound and mood of the album at times differ a lot if you listen to different songs. This album has both vivid teenager impressions and bitter life lessons”.

The album includes a few tracks in collaboration with Cory Brandan from Norma Jean. Brandon features in the "Solar Empire" and “Everything Burns” tracks.

Unlike previous albums, The Void was not recorded in the band's home city but at the Polish studio Hertz by the Wieslawski brothers, who were working with such bands as Behemoth and Vader. The mastering was done at Turtle Tone studio.

== 2018 - Black Sails ==
Weesp released the "Illumination" single at the end of 2017, together with the official video.

The band released two more singles in February and March 2018 - "Not Over" and "Who We Are" and in addition a "Not Over" official music video.

== 2019 - Crystal Clear Waters ==
On September 11, 2019, Weesp released their new album, Crystal Clean Waters. The band filmed music videos for new versions of "Illumination", "Red Neon Glow" and "Monsters" songs, which are on YouTube.

== 2020 - Pain ==
On September 11, Weesp's new album, Pain, was released. It includes 8 tracks in Russian.

== 2022 - The Path in the Dark ==
On September 1, the new single "The Time Will Come" was released from the upcoming album called "The Way in the Dark", which the band will present in the winter of 2023.

On October 6, another single was released called "We will not be found" from the aforementioned album "The Way in the Dark".

On November 30, the group released a single called "Dirt".

On January 31, a new track "The Abyss Looked At Me" was released.

== Discography ==
=== Studio albums ===
- 2009 – tasteofsteel

No.	Title	Length
1.	"Taste of steel"	04:01
2.	"rivalry spirit"	02:28
3.	"Charcoal and chalk"	05:57
4.	"Caves"	04:43
5.	"Tooth-brush"	05:05
6.	"Funny Faces"	03:07

- 2011 – This Will Destroy Us

No.	Title	Length
1.	"This Will Destroy US"	03:38
2.	"There's Like No Tomorrow"	04:39
3.	"Livan"	04:21
4.	"Sub"	03:41
5.	"The Horror"	05:09
6.	"Exodus: remastered"	03:07

- 2015 – The Void

No.	Title	Length
1.	"Livan"	04:26
2.	"Solar Empire (feat Cory Brandan of Norma Jean)"	04:28
3.	"Unstable Matter"	03:18
4.	"Beware the Blind Spots"	03:58
5.	"Icarus Flight"	03:43
6.	"Charcoal and Chalk"	05:16
7.	"Bruises and the Cuts"	04:24
8.	"Murderers"	04:07
9.	"Full Stop"	04:01
10.	"Omen"	03:53
11.	"The Void"	04:14
12.	"Everything Burns (feat Cory Brandan of Norma Jean)"	06:49
13.	"Waves"	04:50

- 2018 - Black Sails

No.	Title	Length
1.	"Who We Are"	05:52
2.	"Red Neon Glow"	04:16
3.	"Monsters"	04:00
4.	"Not Over"	05:14
5.	"Roads, Hotels"	04:40
6.	"The Stream"	03:26
7.	"Illumination"	04:24
8.	"Black Sails"	05:38
9.	"After Us"	04:29

- 2019 – Crystal Clean Waters

No.	Title	Length
1.	"Illumination (Acoustic Version)"	04:24
2.	"Red Neon Glow (Acoustic Version)"	03:31
3.	"Monsters (Acoustic Version)"	04:03
4.	"Beware the Blind Spots (Acoustic Version)"	02:31
5.	"Who We Are (Acoustic Version)"	03:51
6.	"Livan (Acoustic Version)"	03:27
7.	"Roads and Hotels (Acoustic Version)"	03:20
8.	"After Us (Live)"	04:57
9.	"Monsters (Live)"	04:23

- 2020 – Pain
  No.	Title	Length
  1.	"Moths"
  2.	"Iron Region"
  3.	"Real"
  4.	"Shot In The Sky"
  5.	"Emptiness"
  6.	"Red Hallway"
  7.	"Who We Are"
  8.	"Iron Region (Acoustic)"

=== Singles ===
- 2009 — "Exodus: origins"
- 2011 — "Our Own Gale"
- 2013 — "Caves unplugged"
- 2015 — "Murderers"
- 2015 — "Solar Empire"
- 2017 — "Illumination"
- 2018 — "Not Over"
- 2018 — "Who We Are"
- 2020 — «Iron Region»
- 2020 — «Shot In The Sky»
- 2022 — «There Will Come A Time»
- 2022 — «We Won't Be Found»
- 2022 — «Dirt»
- 2023 — «The Abyss Looked At Me»

=== Live ===
- 2010 — Livan
- 2011 — "Omen" (The Prodigy cover)

=== Music videos ===
- 2011 – "Livan"
- 2013 – "Caves unplugged"
- 2013 – "Our Own Gale" (lyric-video)
- 2013 – "Sub"
- 2015 – "Murderers"
- 2015 – "Solar Empire"
- 2017 – "Illumination"
- 2018 – "Not Over"
- 2018 – "Who We Are"
- 2018 – "Black Sails"
- 2019 – "Crystal Clean Waters"

== Members ==
- Alexei (Lex) Falco – vocals, piano
- Michail (Mike) Zalucky – guitars
- Dmitry (Mi) Budzko – bass
- Stanislav (Stak) Budzko – electronics
- Maxim (Max) Sudakov – drums
