= Operation Exodus (Louisiana) =

Operation Exodus is a plan created and publicized by the Sheriff's Department of Bossier Parish, Louisiana. The name is a deliberate reference to the Book of Exodus.

== Overview ==
The goal of the plan is to provide for the parish's self-sufficiency in the event of a crisis, such as a natural disaster or terrorist attack. The sheriff's department plans to train volunteers to defend local resources, such as fuel, from looting that might occur after a disaster. The existence of the ongoing program is anticipated to cost $4500 to pay for training and uniforms, as the weapons expected to be used are already owned by the Sheriff's Department.

== Media reaction ==
Rachel Maddow discussed Operation Exodus with guest Frank Schaeffer on her MSNBC show. Schaeffer claimed the name of the program was a "backhanded comment about the [legitimacy of the] United States government,[and] Barack Obama," as the Israelites fled an unjust leader in the Book of Exodus. The department's own press release states that the name is a reference to "the Israelites...learning to be self-sufficient and handle everything alone, just as the plan provides."

Citing the department's possession of a .50-caliber machine gun, Reason managing editor Jesse Walker described the program as "the intersection of two ugly trends: the militarization of disaster response and the militarization of police work."
