= Diaspora (spice company) =

American spice company

Diaspora Co.
- Company type: Private
- Industry: Food, spices
- Founded: 2017; 9 years ago
- Founder: Sana Javeri Kadri
- Headquarters: Oakland, California, United States
- Key people: Sana Javeri Kadri; Sayed Ishtiyaque (Director of Operations); Wynne McAuley (COO)
- Website: www.diasporaco.com

Diaspora Co., aka Diaspora Spice Co., is a company that trades in spices sourced from small farmers in Southeast Asia. The company was founded in August 2017 by Indian-American Sana Javeri Kadri, and is based in California's Bay Area. The company's mission is "to disrupt the industry with culture, equity, and joy."

== History ==
Javeri Kadri was born in Mumbai but lived in the United States. She attended Pomona College and worked on the Pomona College Organic Farm. In 2016, the "golden milk" drink, made primarily with turmeric, became popular. She realized that Mumbai turmeric was higher quality and more potent, so she left Oakland for India feeling disappointed in the quality of the turmeric for sale in the United States. Her investigation into the spice trade led her to found a company that trades in spice from small family farms.

The first spice marketed by Diaspora was turmeric. After visiting the Indian Institute of Spices Research, Kadri noted many different varietals of turmeric that were aromatic, brightly colored, high yielding, and high in curcumin. But those varietals didn’t exist on the commercial market, so Kadri decided to work directly with Indian farmers, eliminating all of the middle agents, and export these turmeric varieties herself. At the start, aiding in the mission to "[change] centuries-old trade practices left over from colonial times", Kadri sourced the turmeric from Kasaraneni Prabhu, who is a fourth-generation turmeric farmer in the Andhra Pradesh state in Southeast India. Further, unlike all of the neighboring turmeric farms, which spray the turmeric with pesticides, Prabhu’s farm is pesticide-free and utilizes the traditional method of co-planting with marigolds.

After intense publicity in 2017, including an endorsement from cookbook author Julia Turshen, Diaspora had to pick up turmeric orders and launched a Kickstarter campaign to fund the introduction of Baraka cardamom, a domesticated strain of naturally pest-resistant wild cardamom grown in the Kerala rain forest. In 2019, Diaspora added Aranya pepper and Guntur Sannam Chilies. In 2020, Diaspora was selling 10 spices. By the end of 2021, the company carried 20 spices. Since creation, Diaspora has expanded to sell over 40 different spices and spice mixes, from over 200 family farms. In July 2022, the company acquired $2.1 million in funding.

== Equity ==
In merging her Oakland and Indian roots, Kadri's committed to making Diaspora “radically inclusive” as a way of supporting marginalized communities whenever possible. Some methods include hiring queer people, especially those of color, whenever possible; paying the farmers fairly with the "Diaspora Co Model" vs the "Traditional Commodity Model," Instead of working with a large company to pack her turmeric, she decided to intentionally pay her community by hiring locally. Diaspora has made an impact in both Andhra Pradesh and Oakland by directly supporting multiple Indian farmers’ operations, and offering American consumers an equitable model for how spices can be both sourced and sold. In turn, Prabhu’s farming methods are spreading among farmers in his area as others are noticing his good returns on crops, his healthy soil, and his higher curcumin concentrated, less water-intensive turmeric variety. Thus, some additional farmers have moved away from pesticide-heavy farming.
