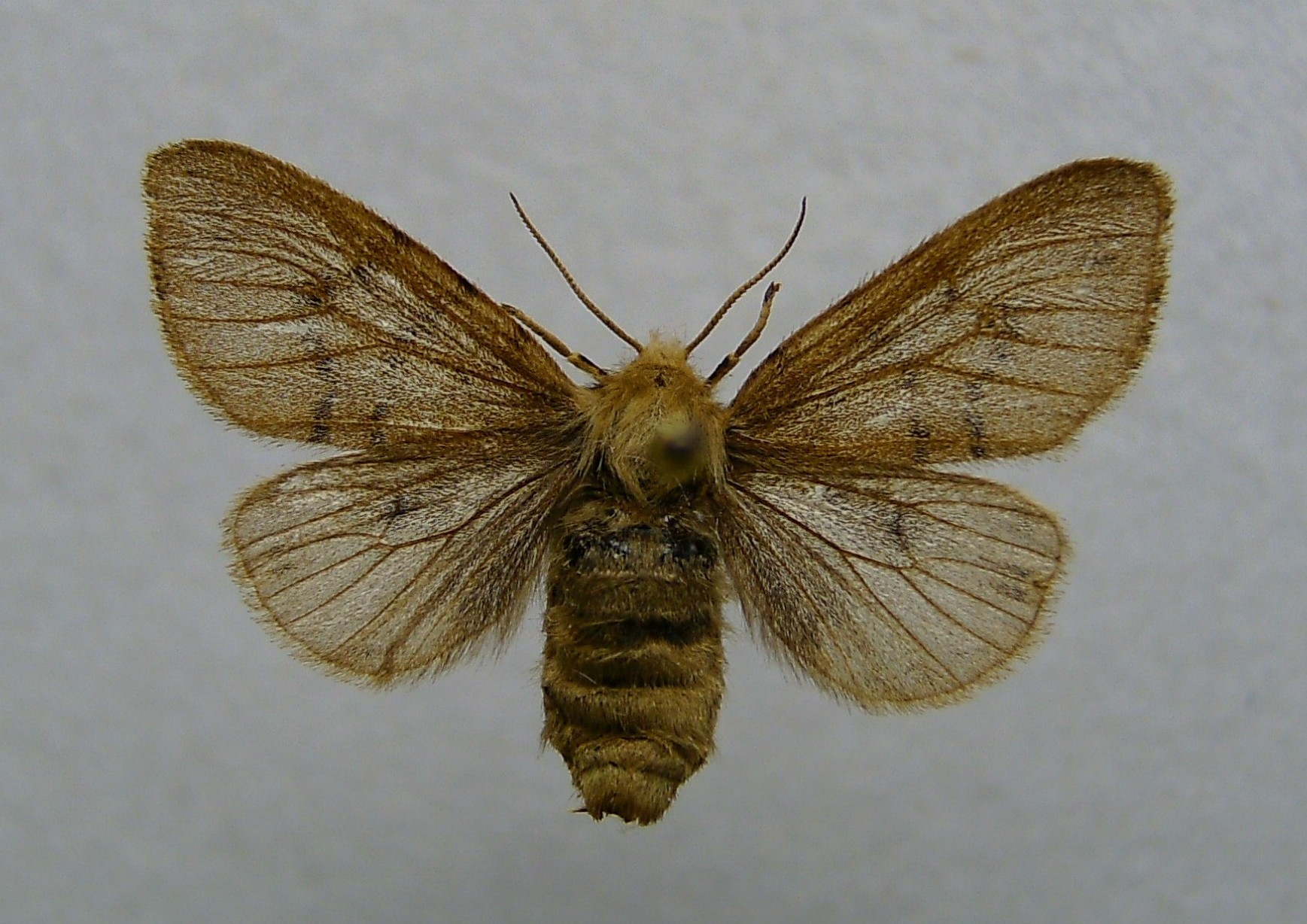
- Female
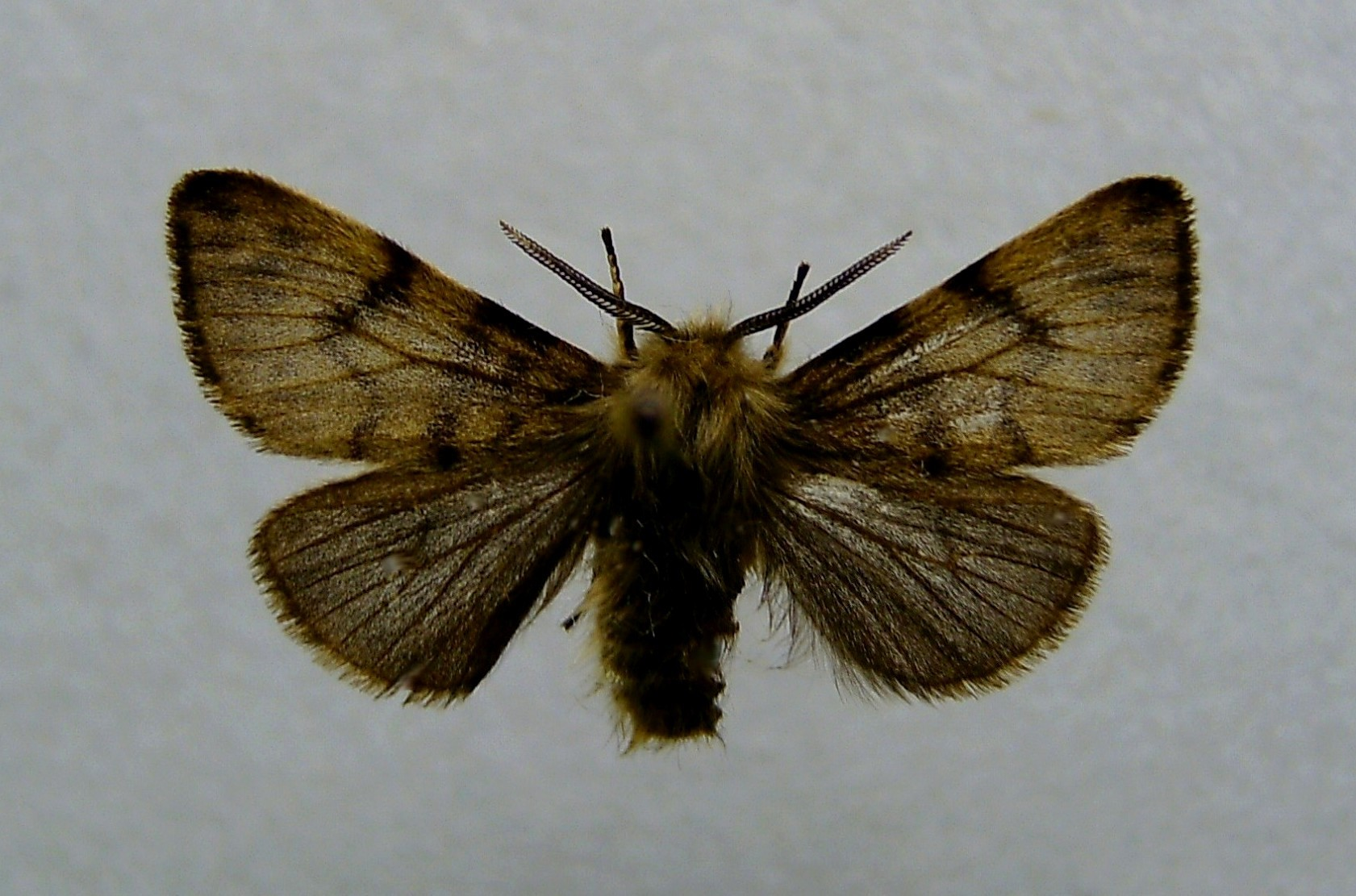
- Male

Scientific classification
- Domain: Eukaryota
- Kingdom: Animalia
- Phylum: Arthropoda
- Class: Insecta
- Order: Lepidoptera
- Superfamily: Noctuoidea
- Family: Erebidae
- Subfamily: Arctiinae
- Genus: Diaphora
- Species: D. sordida

Binomial name
- Diaphora sordida (Hübner, 1803)

Synonyms
- Bombyx sordida Hübner, 1803; Bombyx carbonis Freyer, 1854; Cycnia sordida

= Diaphora sordida =

Species of moth

Diaphora sordida is a moth of the family Erebidae first described by Jacob Hübner in 1803. It is found in the Alps, the Pyrenees and the Apennines.

The wingspan is 21–27 mm. There are two generations per year, with adults on wing from April to June and again from July to August. Adults are day-active.

The larvae feed on various low-growing plants, including Galeopsis, Stellaria, Taraxacum and Plantago species. The larvae can be found in late summer. They overwinter and pupate in spring.
