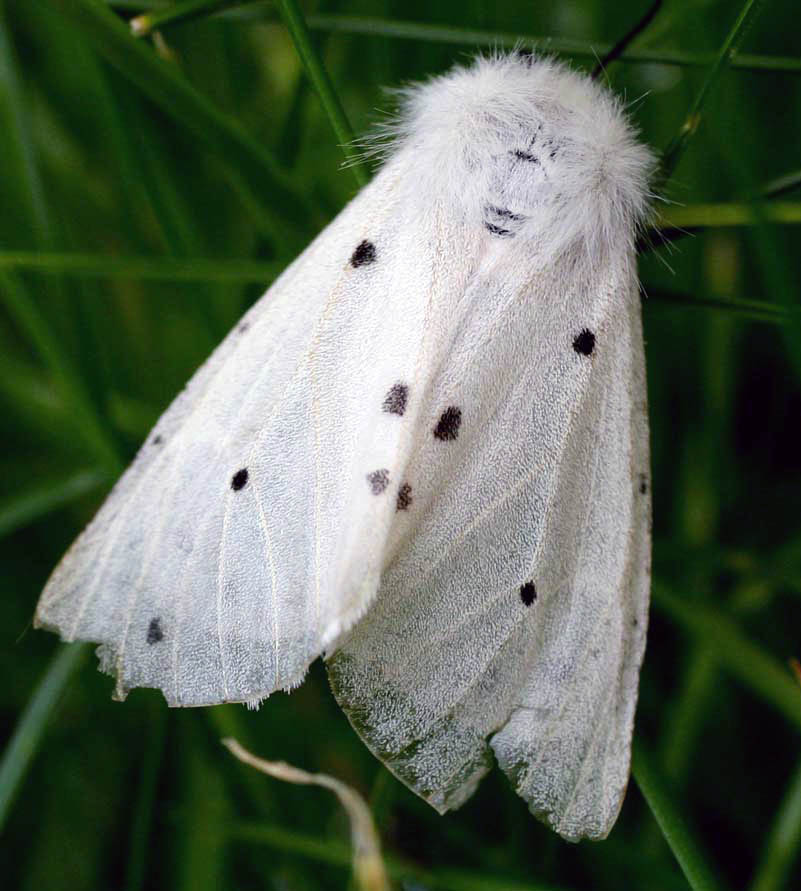
- Diaphora mendica

Scientific classification
- Domain: Eukaryota
- Kingdom: Animalia
- Phylum: Arthropoda
- Class: Insecta
- Order: Lepidoptera
- Superfamily: Noctuoidea
- Family: Erebidae
- Subfamily: Arctiinae
- Subtribe: Spilosomina
- Genus: Diaphora; Stephens, 1827

Type species
- Phalaena mendica Clerck, 1759

= Diaphora =

Genus of moths

Diaphora is a genus of tiger moths in the family Erebidae described by Stephens in 1827. The moths are found in the Palearctic region.

== Species ==
- Diaphora × beata (Caradja, 1898)
- Diaphora × hilaris (Caradja, 1898)
- Diaphora × inversa (Caradja, 1898)
- Diaphora luctuosa (Geyer, [1831])
- Diaphora mendica (Clerck, 1759) – muslin moth
- Diaphora × seileri (Caradja, 1898)
- Diaphora sordida (Hübner, [1803])
