= Exodus (transitional housing) =

Housing organization

Exodus is the name of a number of projects around the world providing supported housing and job training to ex-offenders.

== United States ==
Exodus is a Transitional Housing Campus founded in Grand Rapids, Michigan by Robb Munger. The Exodus House accepts anyone giving men a hand up to learn skills to succeed in life.

The 38,000-square-foot (3,500 m^{2}) building was originally used as a Corrections Facility operated by the State of Michigan. It was one of 14 correction centers the state had built to help convicts transition back to their communities. The facility shut down in February 2008 because of state budget cuts.

== Europe ==
In the Netherlands, Exodus houses are run by Stichting Exodus Nederland. There are `Exodus houses` where (ex-)detainees receive guidance in eleven different municipalities in the Netherlands. On 7 October 2011, Princess Maxima opened Exodus house in Alkmaar.

In the United Kingdom, there are Exodus projects in London and the south east of England, funded by the European Social Fund.
