= VOLAG =

Voluntary refugee reception agencies

VOLAG, sometimes spelled Volag or VolAg, is an abbreviation for "Voluntary Agency". This term refers to any of the nine U.S. private agencies and one state agency that have cooperative agreements with the State Department to provide reception and placement services for refugees arriving in the United States. These agencies use funding from the State Department's Bureau of Population, Refugees, and Migration (PRM) along with self-generated resources to provide refugees with a range of services including sponsorship, initial housing, food and clothing, orientation and counseling. VOLAGs may also contract with the Office of Refugee Resettlement (part of the U.S. Department of Health and Human Services) to provide job placement, English language training and other social services. Each of the ten voluntary agencies recognized by the federal government vary significantly in their history, experience, size, denominational affiliation, philosophy, primary clientele, administrative structure, resettlement capacity, and institutionalized resettlement. Of the ten U.S. resettlement agencies, all of them are religiously affiliated or faith-based with the exception of the U.S. Committee for Refugees and Immigrants and the International Rescue Committee. The tenth VOLAG was added in November 2022, when Bethany Christian Services (BCS) was officially designated as its own resettlement agency by the PRM.

== History ==
Following the end of World War II, President Harry S. Truman issued the Corporate Affidavit Program of 1946 to speed up the admission of thousands of persons displaced by the war. The corporate affidavit guarantees that the U.S. federal government provide financial support to voluntary agencies, ultimately ensuring that displaced persons would not become public charges. Under the Displaced Persons Act of 1948, responsibility for resettling displaced persons was assigned to voluntary agencies and state commissions. The significant influx of Cuban refugees fleeing Fidel Castro's Cuba in the 1960s furthered the partnership between VOLAGs and the federal government. Voluntary agencies initially used private resources, generated by private and public donations, to address the elevated number of Cuban refugees. As a response, in December 1960, President Dwight D. Eisenhower established the Cuban Refugee Emergency Center in Miami and contracted with four voluntary agencies: National Catholic Welfare Conference, Church World Service, International Rescue Committee, and United HIAS Service, providing them with federal funds to assist with their resettlement services. In 1961, President Kennedy implemented a program within the United States Department of Health, Education and Welfare to provide federally funded assistance to Cuban refugees as well as resettlement contracts with the voluntary agencies. In 1978, the passage of a new domestic assistance program, titled the "Soviet and other" refugee program, provided funds to voluntary agencies on a fifty-fifty matching basis, ensuring that refugees not covered by the existing Cuban and Southeast Asian programs would be able to access aid. The Refugee Act of 1980, which established the Office of Refugee Resettlement within the United States Department of Health and Human Services, developed a comprehensive program for domestic refugee resettlement, pinpointing voluntary agencies as a necessary and needed entity for refugee resettlement in the United States. The Office of Refugee Resettlement is currently examining the role of the voluntary agencies in domestic refugee resettlement and is attempting to more clearly define the complex relationship between the VOLAGs and the federal, state, and local governments.

In January 2023, The U.S. Department of State announced the creation of the Welcome Corps, a new private sponsorship program that allows everyday American citizens to sponsor refugees and provide reception and placement support in lieu of VOLAG assistance. The program is still in the initial stages, so any impacts the Welcome Corps may have on VOLAGs or the resettlement program as a whole are yet to be determined.

== Funding ==
Newly-arriving refugees are particularly dependent upon the services of voluntary agencies, especially those who do not have family already living in the United States. According to a 2006 study focused on the role of faith-based refugee resettlement agencies, resettlement agency staff have consistently expressed concern and frustration surrounding the lack of federal funding for voluntary agencies, explicitly stating that the amount of funding provided is not adequate to address the needs of their clients. The U.S. Department of State requires voluntary agencies to conduct a cost analysis of their refugee resettlement services to assess their monetary needs and discern the annual amount of funding that will be provided. A 2008 study conducted by Lutheran Immigration and Refugee Service explained that the federal contributions provided by the U.S. Department of State had provided $850 per-person funding to the organization which, after calculating the actual expenses associated with providing refugee clients with basic needs, cultural orientation, and case management, amounted to only 39 percent of the total cost accrued. The remaining funds were covered by private and public donations, volunteer hours, and direct contributions from affiliate agencies.

The U.S. Senate Committee on Foreign Relations released a report in 2010 criticizing the governmental failure to increase federal funding in order to meet the needs of newly-arriving refugees, stating that ‘the decades-old grant level had declined by more than 50 percent in real terms due to inflation’. Currently, the Department of State provides a one-time payment of $2,375 per individual refugee for local resettlement, of which $1,275 is available for agencies to use to fund the critical assistance needs of refugees, such as food, clothing, and furnishings.

== List of VOLAGs ==
- Church World Service
- Episcopal Migration Ministries
- Ethiopian Community Development Council
- HIAS (formerly Hebrew Immigrant Aid Society)
- International Rescue Committee
- Global Refuge (formerly Lutheran Immigration and Refugee Service)
- U.S. Committee for Refugees and Immigrants
- United States Conference of Catholic Bishops
- World Relief
- Bethany Christian Services
