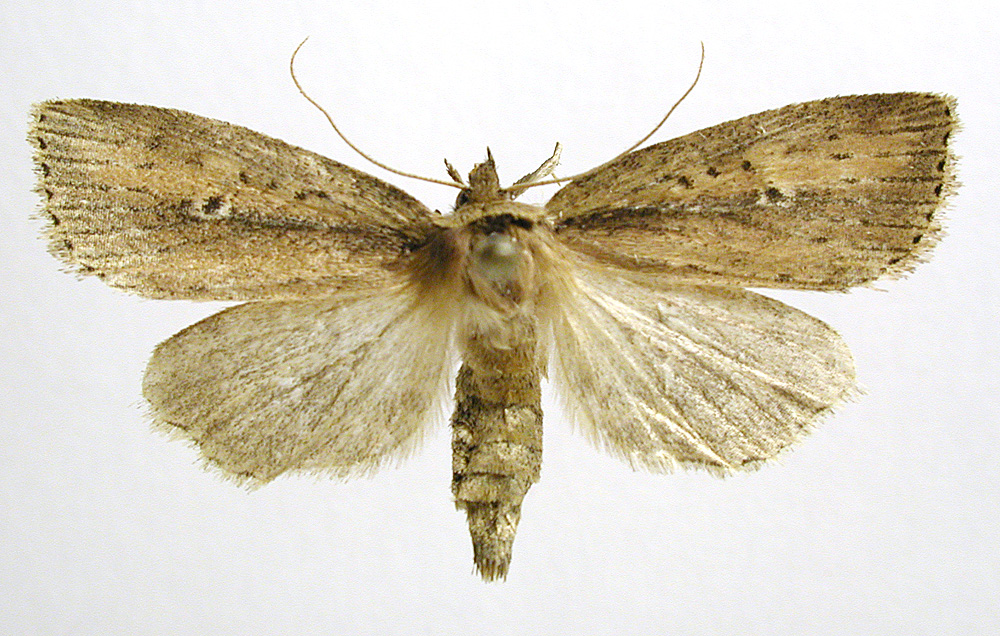

Scientific classification
- Kingdom: Animalia
- Phylum: Arthropoda
- Class: Insecta
- Order: Lepidoptera
- Superfamily: Noctuoidea
- Family: Noctuidae
- Tribe: Apameini
- Genus: Archanara; Walker, 1866

= Archanara =

Genus of moths

Archanara is a genus of moths of the family Noctuidae.

== Species ==
- Archanara aerata (Butler, 1878)
- Archanara affinis Rothschild, 1920
- Archanara cervina Warren, 1911
- Archanara dissoluta – brown-veined wainscot (Treitschke, 1825)
- Archanara geminipuncta Haworth, 1809
- Archanara gigantea Osthelder, 1935
- Archanara insoluta Warren, 1911
- Archanara neurica (Hübner, [1808])
- Archanara phragmiticola (Staudinger, 1892)
- Archanara polita (Walker, 1865)
- Archanara punctilinea Wileman, 1912
- Archanara punctivena Wileman, 1914
- Archanara resoluta Hampson, 1910
- Archanara staettermayeri Schawerda, 1934
- Archanara striata Wileman & South, 1916

== Former species ==
The following species have been transferred via genus Capsula to the genus Globia:

- Globia alameda (Smith, 1903)
- Globia algae Esper, 1789
- Globia laeta Morrison, 1875
- Globia oblonga Grote, 1882
- Globia sparganii Esper, 1790
- Globia subflava Grote, 1882
