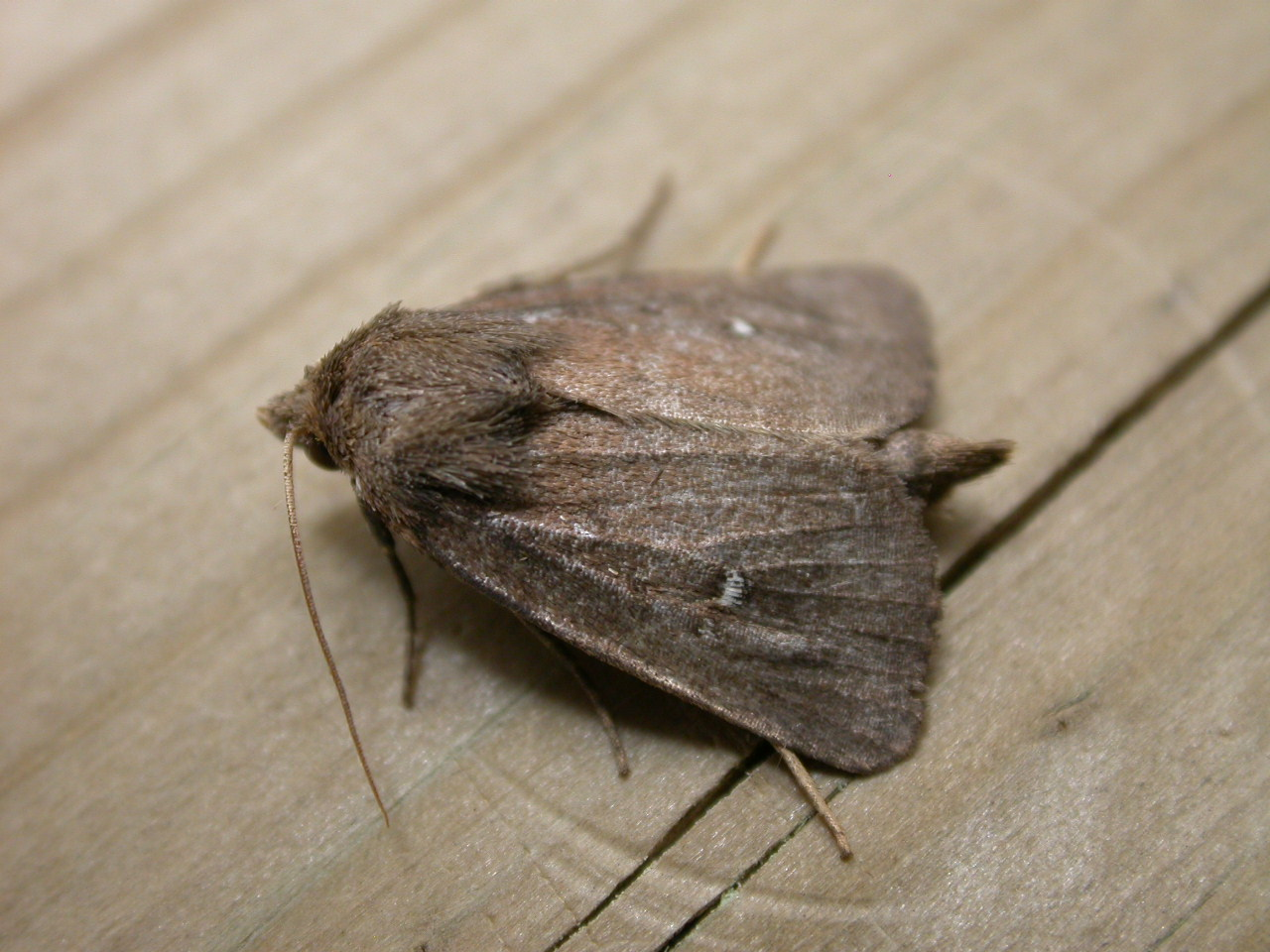

Scientific classification
- Kingdom: Animalia
- Phylum: Arthropoda
- Clade: Pancrustacea
- Class: Insecta
- Order: Lepidoptera
- Superfamily: Noctuoidea
- Family: Noctuidae
- Subfamily: Xyleninae
- Genus: Lenisa; Fibiger, Zilli & Ronkay, 2005
- Species: L. geminipuncta

Binomial name
- Lenisa geminipuncta (Haworth, 1809)

= Lenisa =

Genus of moths

Lenisa is a monotypic genus of moth in the family Noctuidae erected by Michael Fibiger, Alberto Zilli and László Aladár Ronkay in 2005. Its only species, Lenisa geminipuncta, was first described by Adrian Hardy Haworth in 1809. It is found in southern and central Europe, Lebanon, Israel, Turkey, Iraq and in the Caucasus. Some authors place this genus name as a synonym Archanara, and the species as Archanara geminipuncta.
