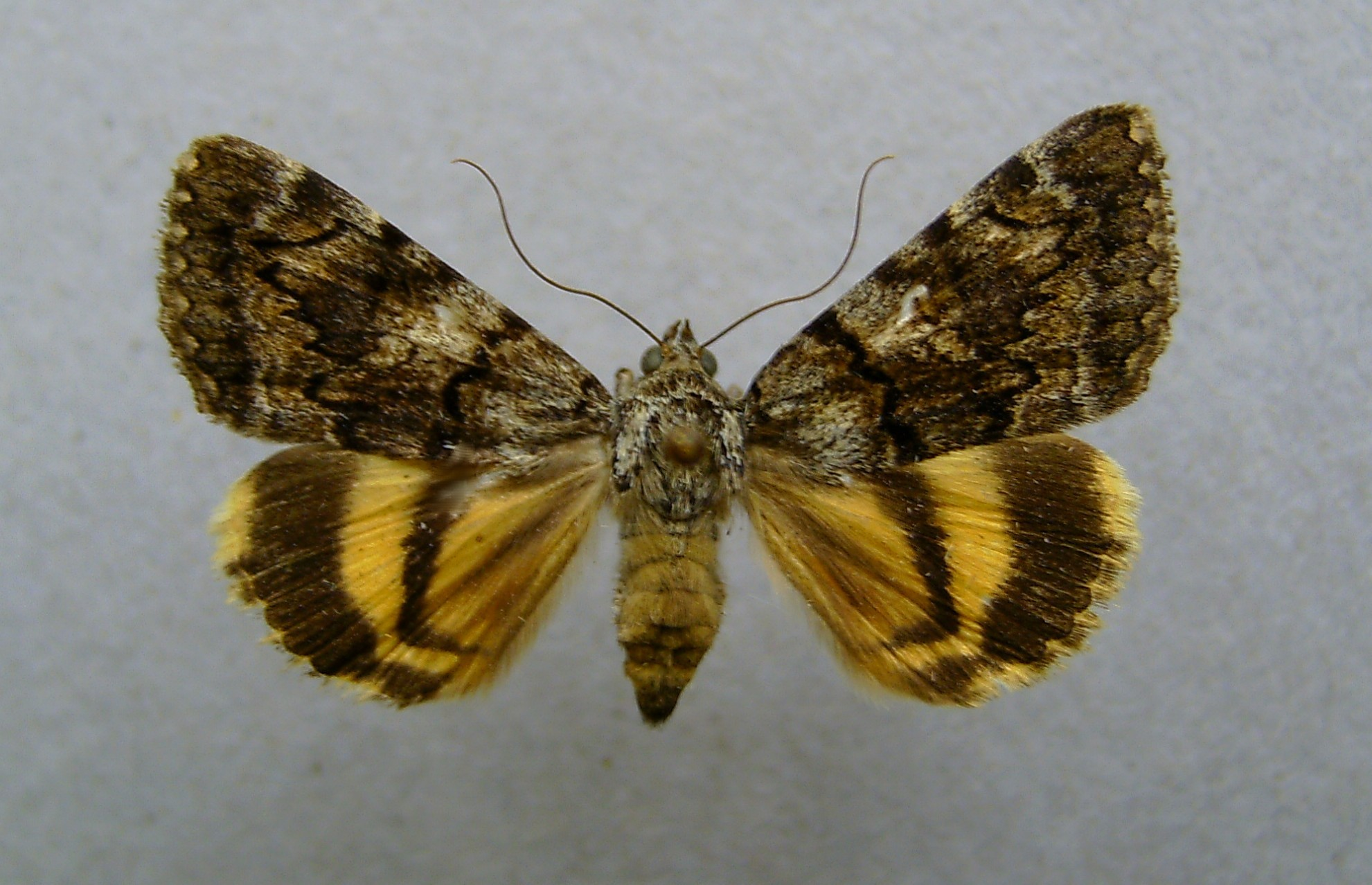

Scientific classification
- Kingdom: Animalia
- Phylum: Arthropoda
- Class: Insecta
- Order: Lepidoptera
- Superfamily: Noctuoidea
- Family: Erebidae
- Genus: Catocala
- Species: C. nymphagoga

Binomial name
- Catocala nymphagoga (Esper, 1787)

Synonyms
- Noctua nymphagoga Esper, 1787; Phalaena uxor Hübner, [1788]; Catocala tmolia Lederer, 1865; Catocala vallantini Oberthür, 1894; Catocala contorta Warren, 1913; Catocala nymphagoga albimixta Warren, 1913; Catocala nymphagoga grisea Warren, 1913

= Catocala nymphagoga =

Species of moth

Catocala nymphagoga, the oak yellow underwing, is a moth of the family Erebidae. It is found in Southern Europe, from Bulgaria up to the Iberian Peninsula and sometimes further north as a migrant. It is also found in North Africa and Asia Minor.

== Technical description and variation ==
Forewing grey more or less wholly suffused with blackish brown, the basal area, or at least its lower half, a costal patch beyond inner line, a streak from costa before outer line, and the submarginal line itself remaining pale; inner and outer lines velvety black, distinct, sometimes doubled; the inner oblique, dentate inwards on the veins; the outer biangulate externally (in vein 5, forming a deep sinus inwards, its end below the reniform pale, and an inward angle on vein 1: reniform indistinct, obscured by the brown median shade, with dark centre and outline; subterminal line waved, distinct, with darker dentate edges; hindwing yellow, with broad black terminal border, containing a small yellow spot at apex and a sinus inwardly in submedian interval: the median band narrow and straight, acutely or squarely angled on the submedian fold, the base of wing often darkened with olive fuscous; - the darkest specimens, with the forewings almost unicolorous black brown, form the ab. anthracita Thierry-Mieg : tmolia Led. has the forewing pale grey; the black median band of hindwing not angled but obscure, acutely zigzag between the veins, which are black; reniform stigma followed by a dark grey cloud, and containing a pale yellowish lunule at centre: hindwing dull red, with a narrow nearly straight black median band, shortly angled inwards on submedian fold; terminal border black, broad at apex, evenly curved on inner edge, and with a deep sinus on submedian interval. Specimens from Uralsk are all smaller, uniform brownish grey, without any black and white shading; the lines line and slight; the black streak from base above and below the submedian fold well marked; hindwing with medianband curved, thinner; terminal border nearly or quite interrupted across submedian interval. They may be distinguished for the present as subsp. detrita subsp. nov.[now full species Catocala detritaWarren, 1913'. Larva extremely like that of electa, pale yellowish grey, finely black-dotted, with two obscure dorsal streaks; hump on segment 9 small, yellowish; that on 12 slight and bifid; head small, grey with dark marks and two small reddish protuberances. The wingspan is 35–43 millimetres (1.4–1.7 in).

== Biology ==
Adults are on wing from June to August depending on the location.

The larvae feed on Quercus species.
