= N. laeta =

N. laeta may refer to:

- Naticopsis laeta, an extinct snail
- Neptis laeta, a Subsaharan African butterfly
- Nigma laeta, a Central Asian spider
- Nonagria laeta, a North American moth
