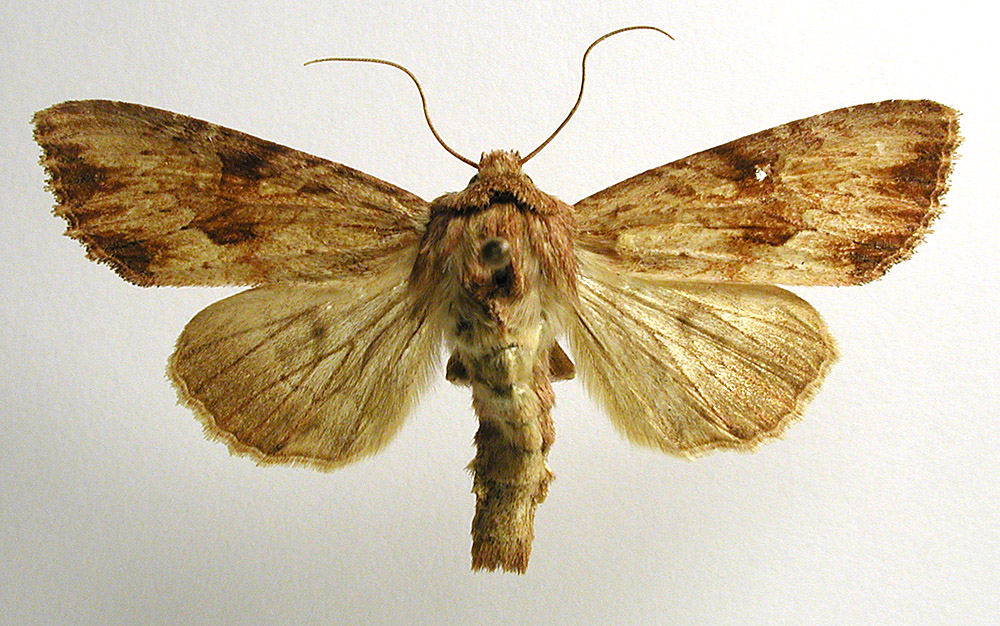

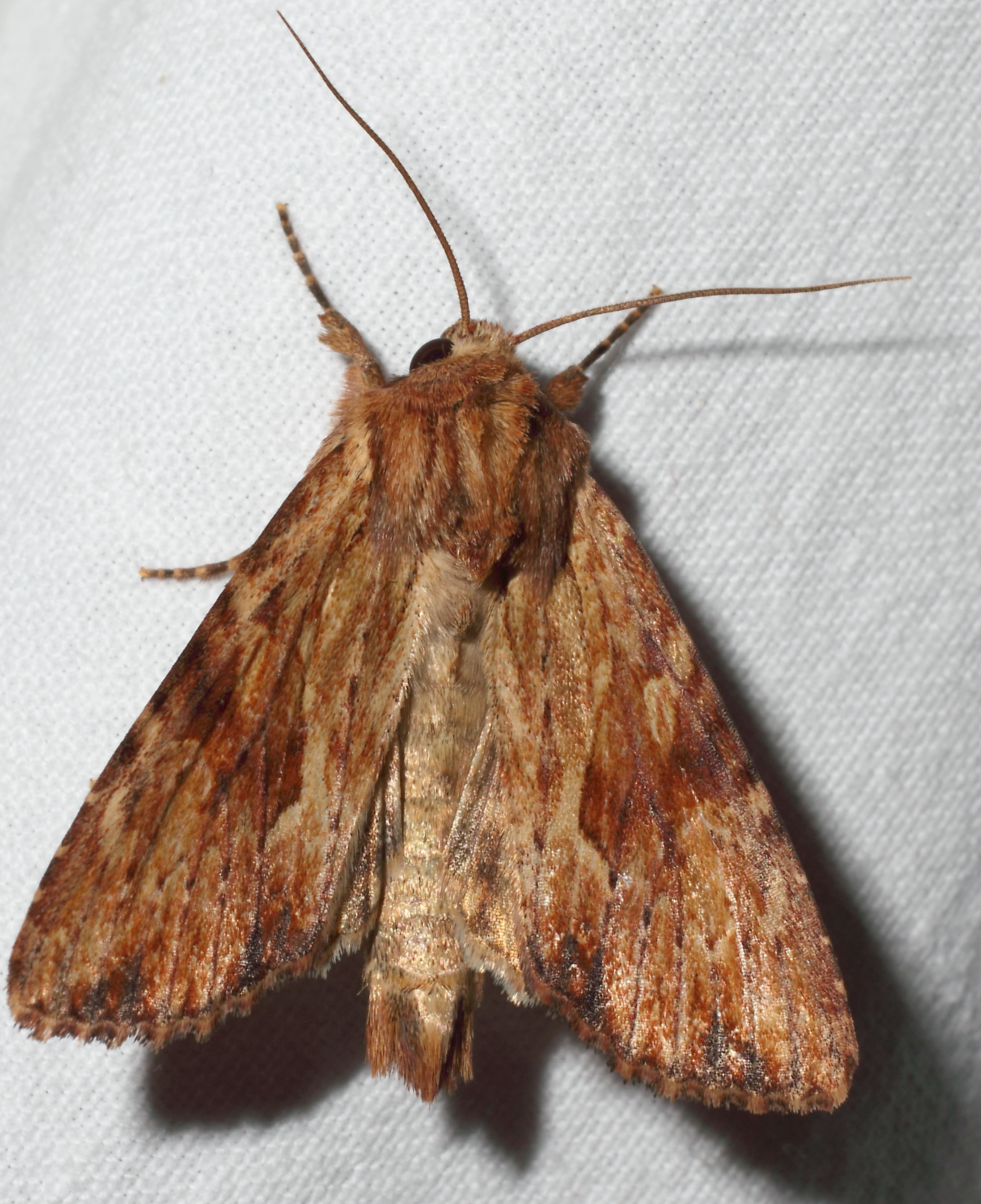

Scientific classification
- Domain: Eukaryota
- Kingdom: Animalia
- Phylum: Arthropoda
- Class: Insecta
- Order: Lepidoptera
- Superfamily: Noctuoidea
- Family: Noctuidae
- Genus: Apamea
- Species: A. sublustris

Binomial name
- Apamea sublustris (Esper, 1788)

Synonyms
- Phalaena (Noctua) sublustris Esper, 1788

= Apamea sublustris =

Reddish light arches

Species of moth

Apamea sublustris, the reddish light arches, is a moth of the family Noctuidae. The species was first described by Eugenius Johann Christoph Esper in 1788. It is found in central and southern Europe (including southern Great Britain), Turkey and the Caucasus.

== Description ==
The wingspan is 42–48 mm. It differs from the very similar Apamea lithoxylaea in having the forewing shorter, more strongly suffused with brown, or brownish grey, especially along costa which in A. lithoxylaea is whitish: stigmata much plainer; outer line more continuously lunulate-dentate, the median shade at its lower extremity extending from inner to outer line; the terminal brown shades more distinct; the brown clouding on submedian fold before submarginal line absent; hindwing with better-defined markings.

== Biology ==
Adults are on wing from June to July.

The larvae feed on the roots of various grasses, including fescues.
