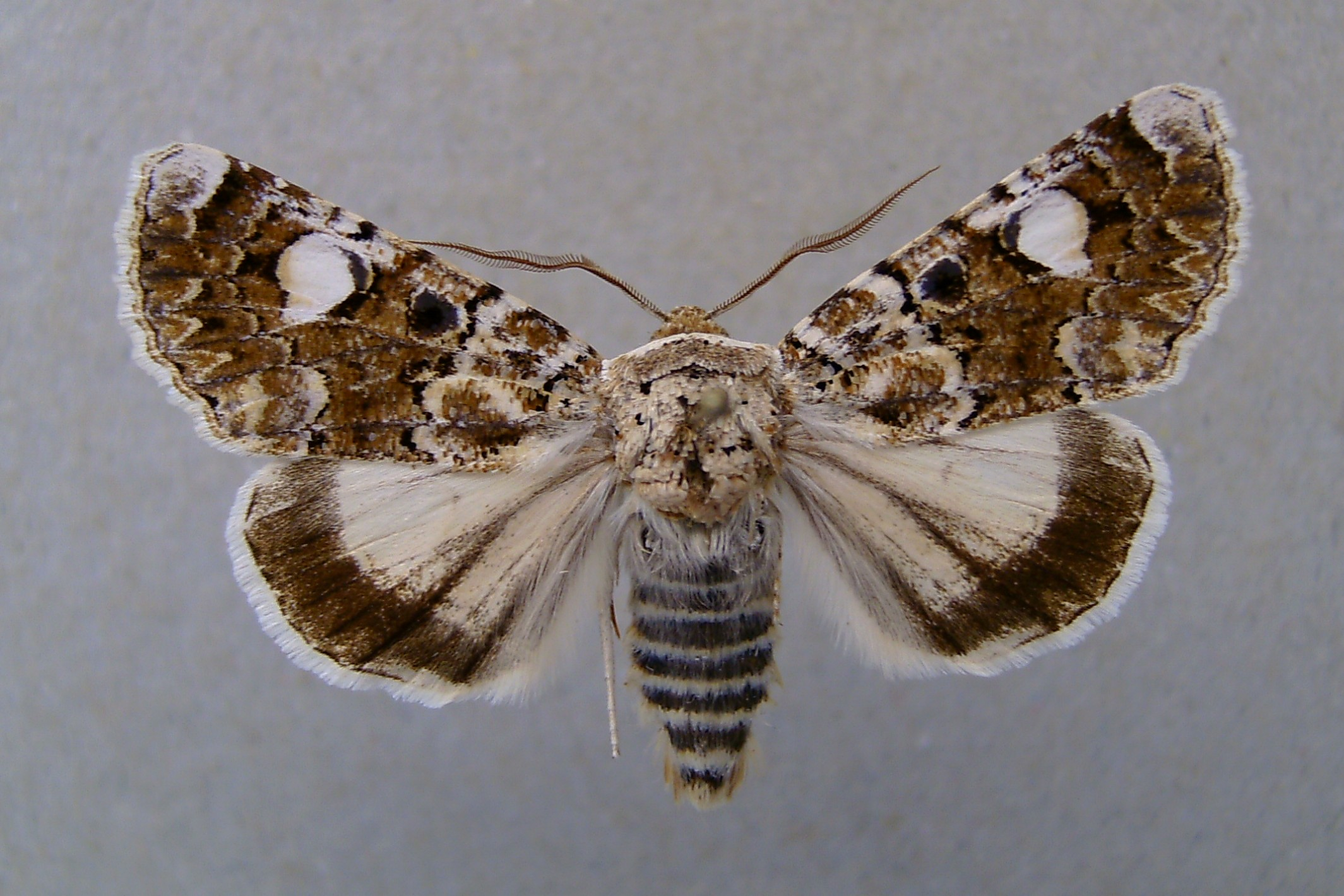
- Male

Scientific classification
- Domain: Eukaryota
- Kingdom: Animalia
- Phylum: Arthropoda
- Class: Insecta
- Order: Lepidoptera
- Superfamily: Noctuoidea
- Family: Noctuidae
- Genus: Oxytripia
- Species: O. orbiculosa

Binomial name
- Oxytripia orbiculosa (Esper, 1799)

Synonyms
- Phalaena (Bombyx) orbiculosa Esper, [1800]; Oxytrypia obriculosa var. ussurica Schawerda, 1923; Oxytripia noctivolans Pinker, 1980

= Oxytripia orbiculosa =

Species of moth

Oxytripia orbiculosa is a moth of the family Noctuidae. It is found in most of the Palearctic realm.

The wingspan is 31–59 mm. Adults are on wing in October in one generation per year.

The larvae feed on Iris species. Young larvae mine while older larvae feed within the Rhizome, where pupation also takes place. Larvae can be found from April to August. The species overwinters as an egg.

== Subspecies ==
- Oxytripia orbiculosa orbiculosa (Spain to Japan)
- Oxytripia orbiculosa noctivolans Pinker, 1980 (Asia Minor through Iran and Turkmenistan to the Tian Shan mountains)
