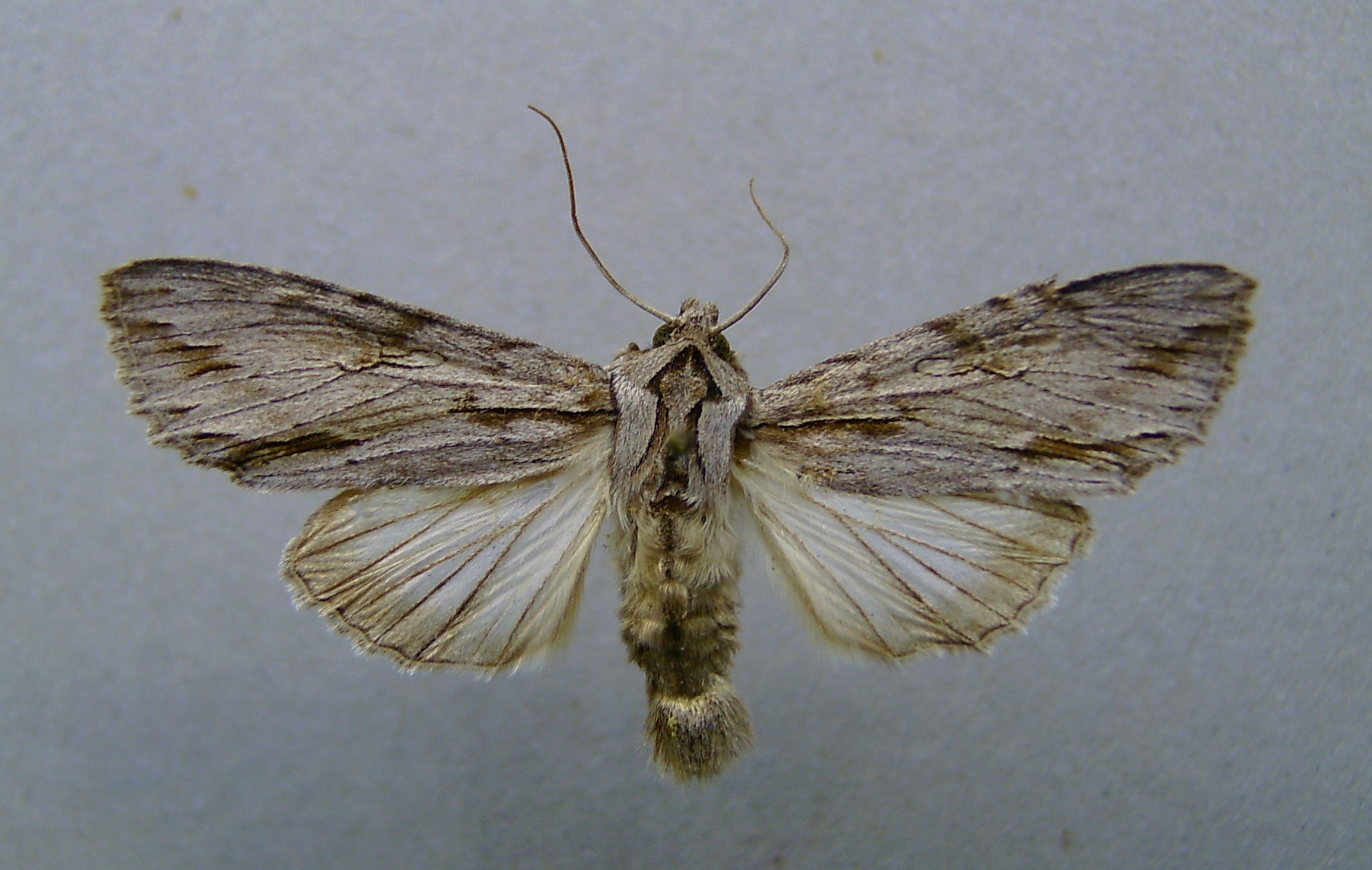

Scientific classification
- Domain: Eukaryota
- Kingdom: Animalia
- Phylum: Arthropoda
- Class: Insecta
- Order: Lepidoptera
- Superfamily: Noctuoidea
- Family: Noctuidae
- Genus: Auchmis
- Species: A. detersa

Binomial name
- Auchmis detersa (Esper, 1791)

Synonyms
- Rhizogramma detersa; Auchmis comma; Phalaena (Noctua) detersa Esper, 1791; Noctua comma Denis & Schiffermüller, 1775 (preocc.); Phalaena Noctua petroriza Borkhausen, 1792; Xylina indicatura Walker, 1858; Auchmis comma andalusica Rungs, 1967; Rhizogramma detersa argentea Caradja, 1932

= Auchmis detersa =

Species of moth

Auchmis detersa is a moth of the family Noctuidae first described by Eugenius Johann Christoph Esper in 1791. It is found from north-western Africa through southern and central Europe to Anatolia, Iran, Afghanistan and through Siberia to Lake Baikal.

The wingspan is 40–51 mm. Adults are on wing from June to September.

The young larvae feed on Berberis vulgaris. The larvae overwinter and pupate in May of the following year.

== Subspecies ==
- Auchmis detersa detersa (central and southern Europe)
- Auchmis detersa demavendi Schwingenschuss, 1955
- Auchmis detersa margarita Ronkay & Varga, 1997
- Auchmis detersa minoica Reisser, 1958 (Crete)
