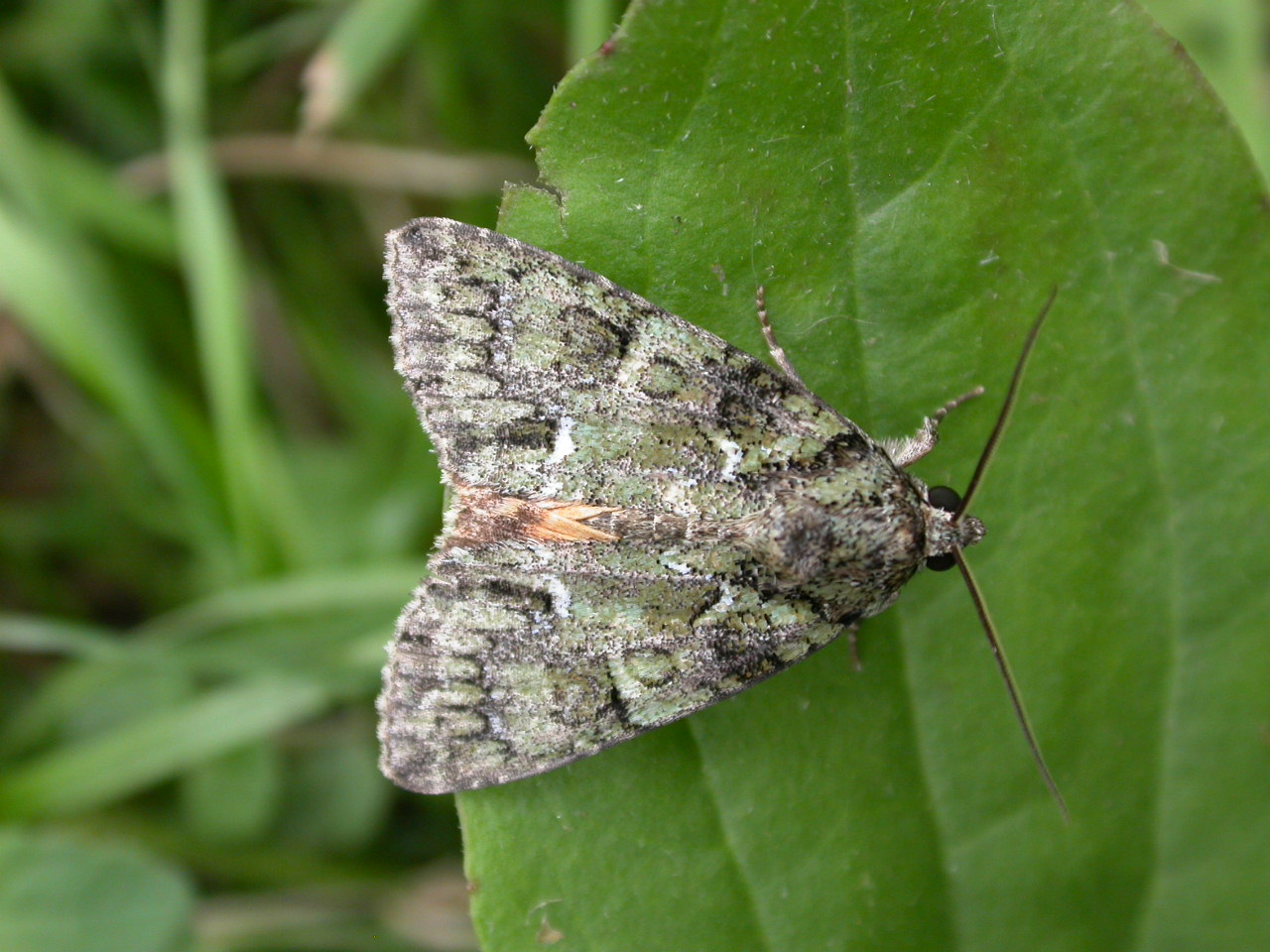

Scientific classification
- Domain: Eukaryota
- Kingdom: Animalia
- Phylum: Arthropoda
- Class: Insecta
- Order: Lepidoptera
- Superfamily: Noctuoidea
- Family: Noctuidae
- Genus: Polyphaenis
- Species: P. sericata

Binomial name
- Polyphaenis sericata (Esper, 1787)

= Polyphaenis sericata =

Species of moth

Polyphaenis sericata, the Guernsey underwing, is a moth of the family Noctuidae. The species was first described by Eugenius Johann Christoph Esper in 1787. It is found in Europe and Asia.

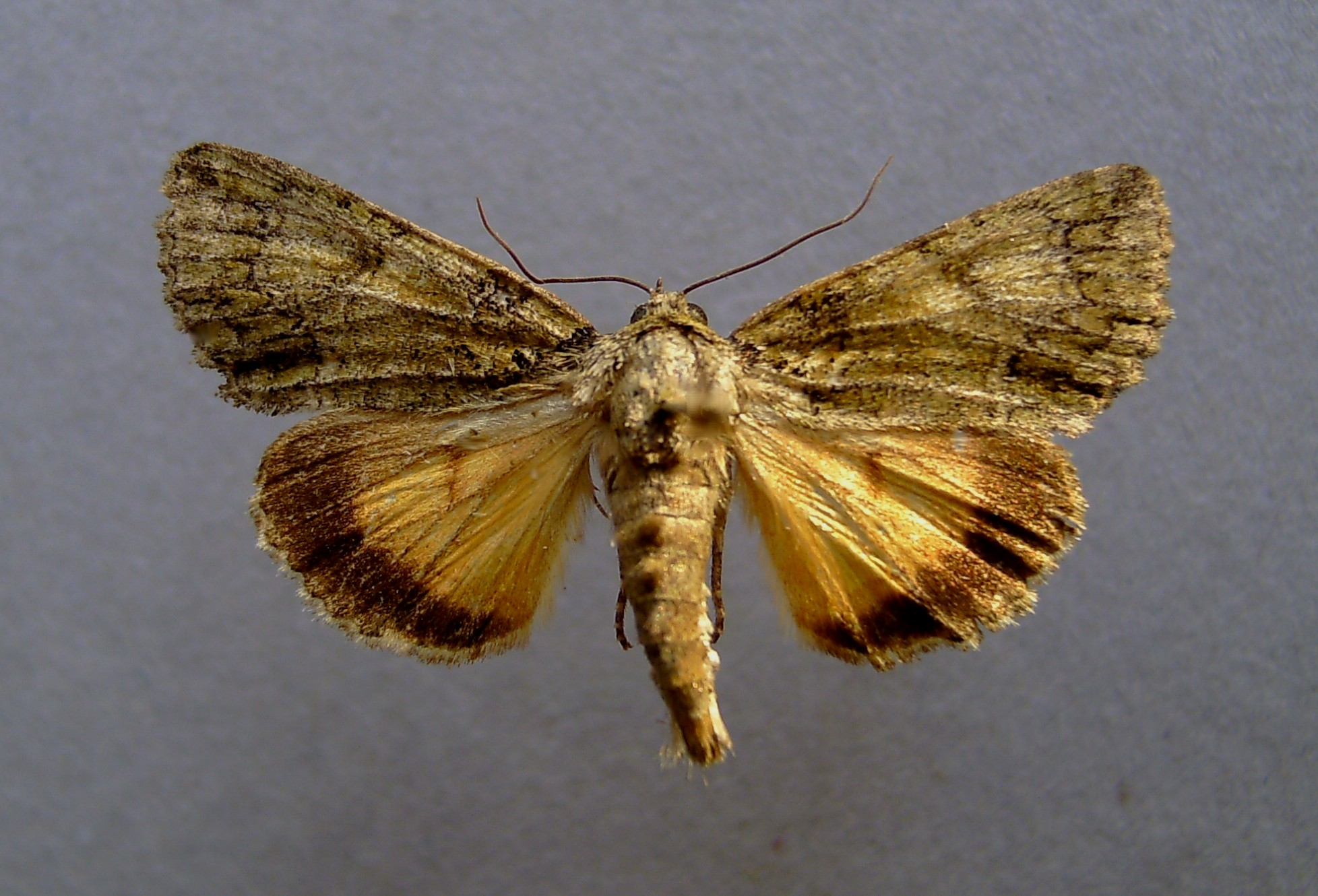
Mounted

The wingspan is 38–44 millimetres (1.5–1.7 in).

The larvae feed on various herbaceous plants, including privet, honeysuckle and dogwood.
