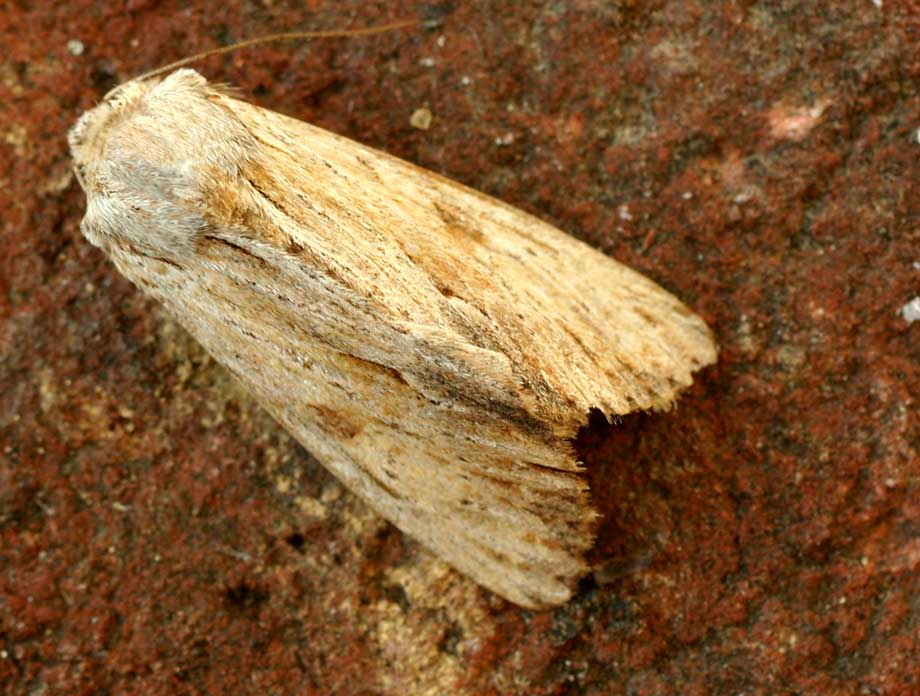

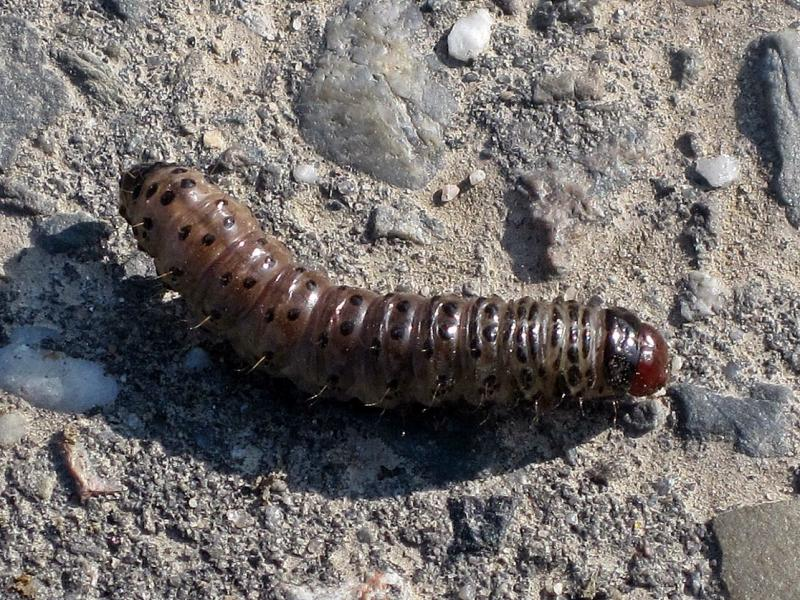

Scientific classification
- Kingdom: Animalia
- Phylum: Arthropoda
- Clade: Pancrustacea
- Class: Insecta
- Order: Lepidoptera
- Superfamily: Noctuoidea
- Family: Noctuidae
- Genus: Apamea
- Species: A. lithoxylaea

Binomial name
- Apamea lithoxylaea (Denis & Schiffermüller, 1775)

= Apamea lithoxylaea =

Light arches

Species of moth

Apamea lithoxylaea, the light arches, is a moth of the family Noctuidae. The species was first described by Michael Denis and Ignaz Schiffermüller in 1775. It is distributed throughout Europe, the Caucasus, Armenia, Asia Minor, Turkey, and ranges east to the Altai Mountains.

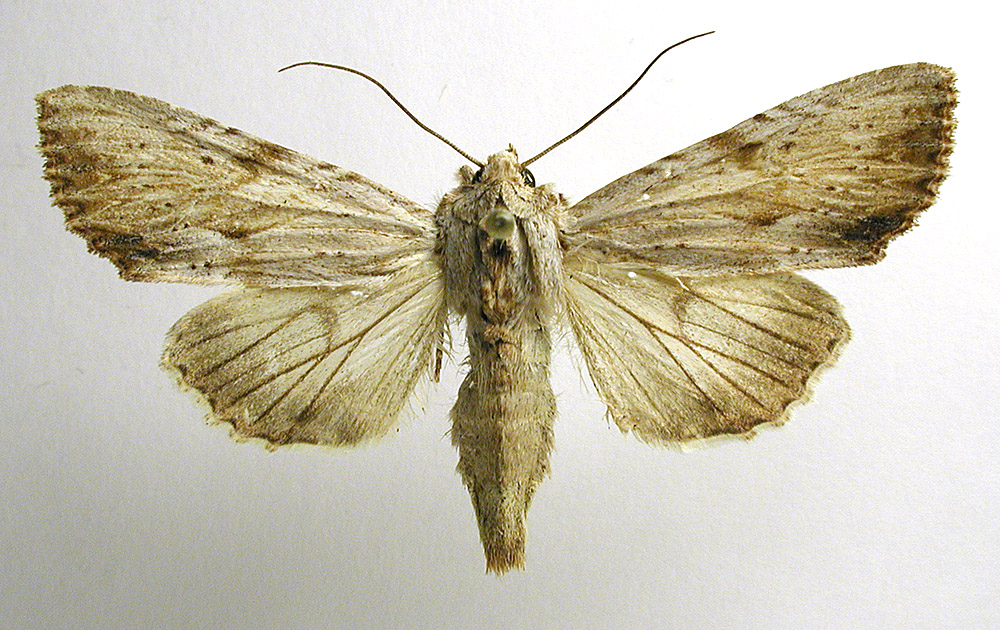
Museum specimen

== Description ==
This species has a wingspan of 43 to 50 mm (1.7 to 2.0 in). Forewing whitish ochreous, faintly washed with pale brown; veins brown before termen; inner and outer lines pale, brown edged, more or less interrupted except on the costa; the inner with sharp long teeth outwards between veins, the outer marked by a double row of brown vein dots; a broad diffuse brown median shade ending on submedian fold where it is margined distinctly with brown; submarginal line acutely dentate, preceded by olive brown wedge-shaped marks, and followed by darker brown dentate marks to margin, strongest on both folds; orbicular and reniform hardly marked, separated by the brown median shade; hindwing whitish ochreous, with the veins and cell spot brown; a diffuse brownish submarginal cloud. See also the very similar Apamea sublustris.

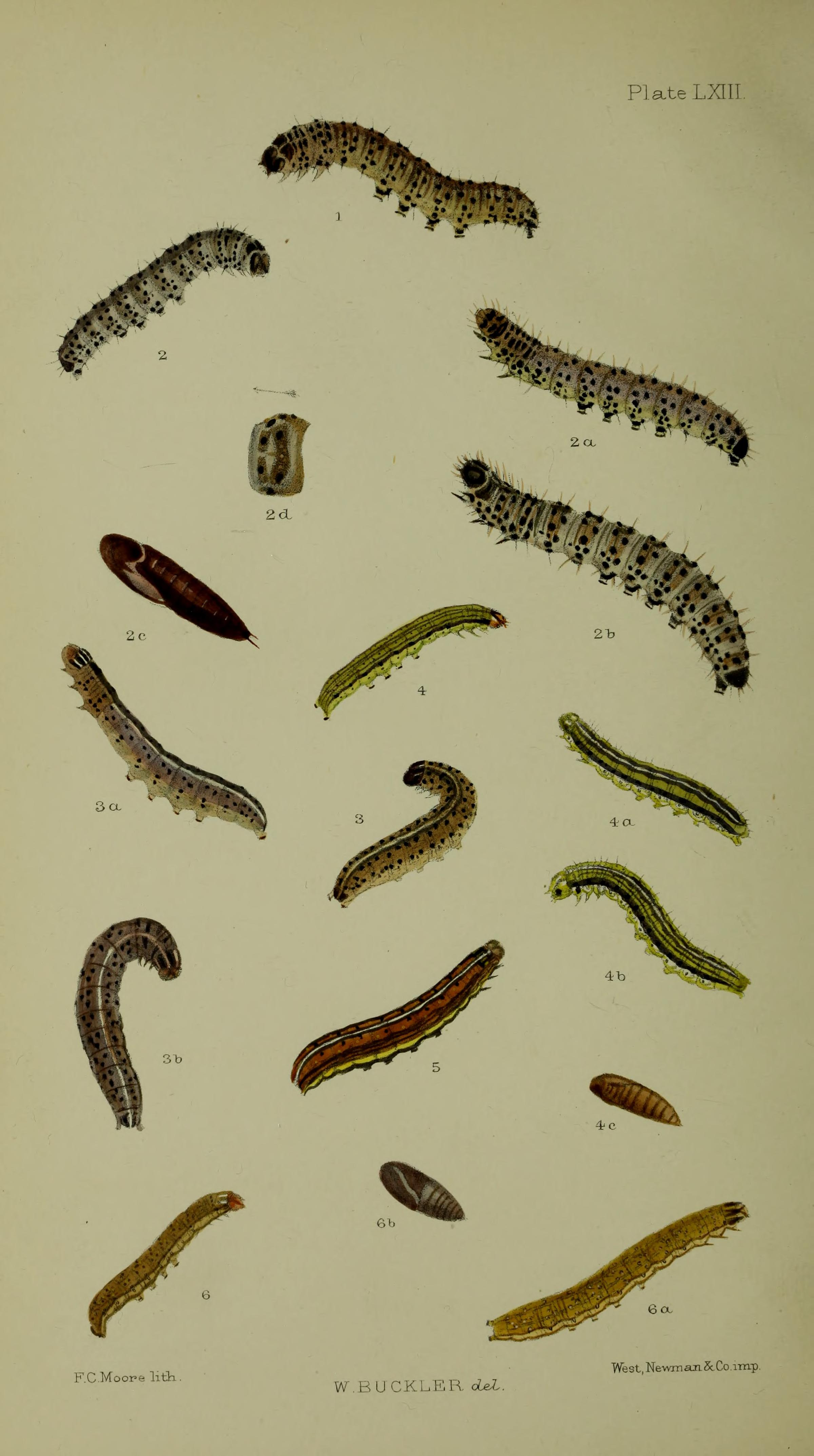
Fig.1 larvae after final moult

== Biology ==
It flies at night from June to August and is attracted to light and sugar. It usually produces a single brood from June to mid-August, but it may have a second brood in September to November.

The larva is ochreous or greenish grey, with dark tubercles; head and thoracic plate black. It feeds on various grasses, especially the stems and roots.
