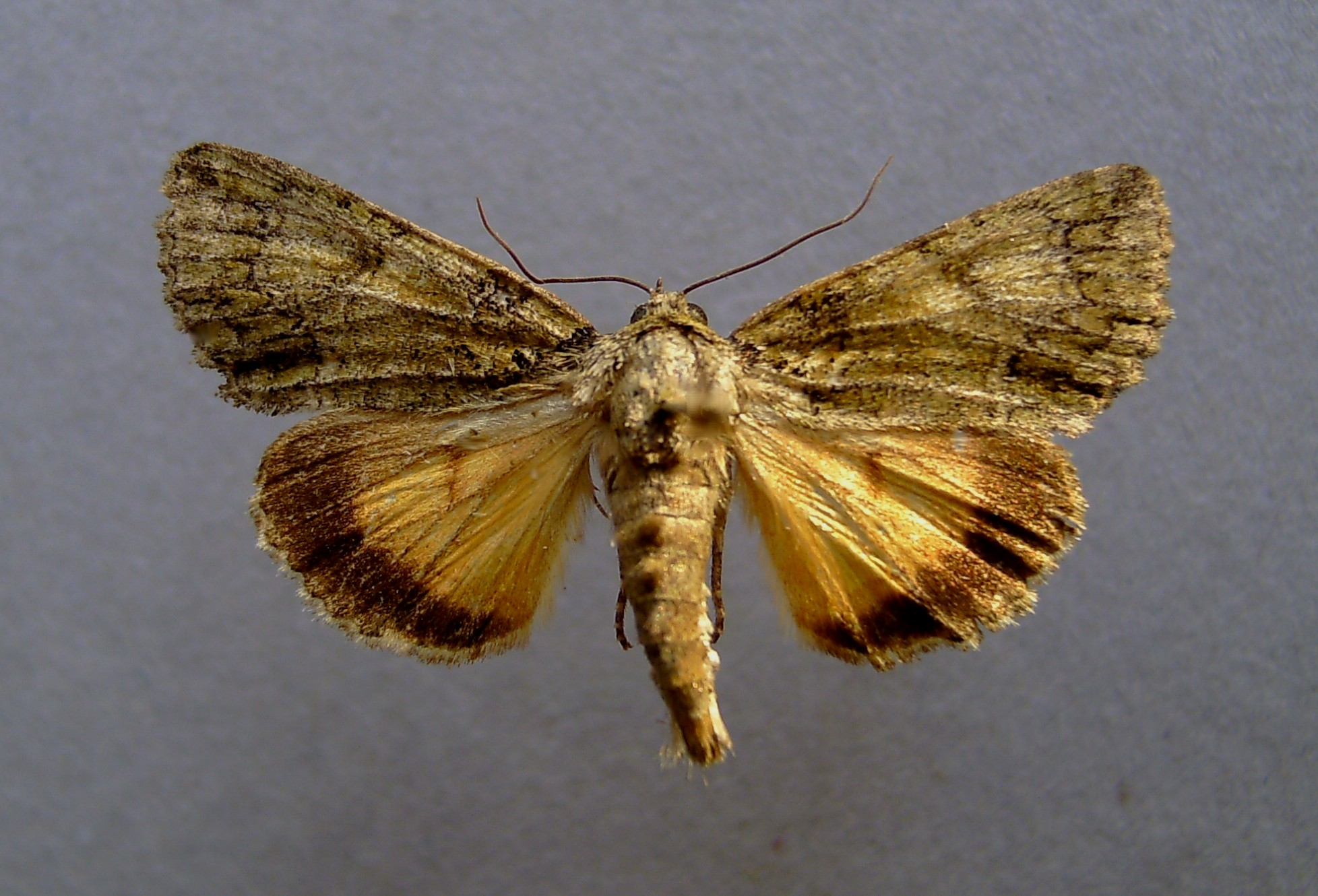
- Polyphaenis sericata

Scientific classification
- Domain: Eukaryota
- Kingdom: Animalia
- Phylum: Arthropoda
- Class: Insecta
- Order: Lepidoptera
- Superfamily: Noctuoidea
- Family: Noctuidae
- Subfamily: Xyleninae
- Genus: Polyphaenis; Boisduval, 1840

= Polyphaenis =

Genus of moths

Polyphaenis is a genus of moths of the family Noctuidae.

== Species ==
- Polyphaenis hemiphaenis Boursin, 1970
- Polyphaenis monophaenis Brandt, 1938
- Polyphaenis propinqua Staudinger, 1895
- Polyphaenis sericata (Esper, [1787])
- Polyphaenis subviridis (Butler, 1878)
