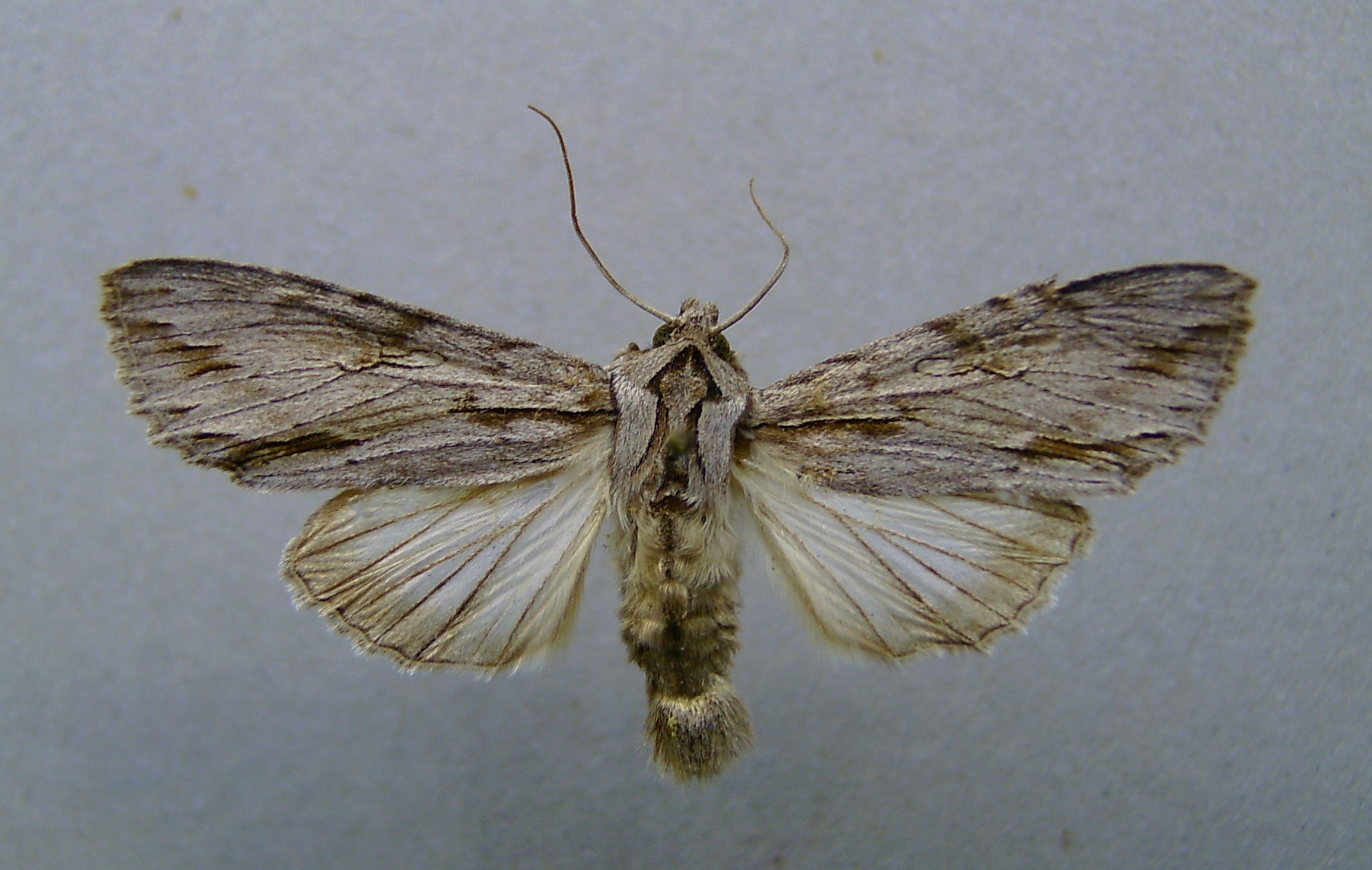
- Auchmis detersa

Scientific classification
- Kingdom: Animalia
- Phylum: Arthropoda
- Clade: Pancrustacea
- Class: Insecta
- Order: Lepidoptera
- Superfamily: Noctuoidea
- Family: Noctuidae
- Subfamily: Acronictinae
- Genus: Auchmis; Hübner, [1821]

Synonyms
- Euscotia Butler, 1889; Rhizogramma Lederer, 1857; Stenostigma Warren, 1911; Trichorhiza Hampson, 1905

= Auchmis =

Genus of moths

Auchmis is a genus of moths of the family Noctuidae.

== Description ==
Its eyes are naked and without lashes. The proboscis is well developed. Palpi porrect (extending forward), where the second joint evenly scaled and third joint prominent. Antennae ciliated in male. Thorax tuftless. Abdomen with small dorsal tufts on proximal segments. Mid tibia very rarely spined. Wings with crenulate cilia. Hindwings with obsolescent vein 5.

== Species ==
- Auchmis composita Plante, 1989
- Auchmis crassicornis Boursin, 1960
- Auchmis curva (Staudinger, 1889)
- Auchmis detersa (Esper, 1791)
- Auchmis detersina (Staudinger, 1896)
- Auchmis hannemanni Plante, 1989
- Auchmis imbi Ronkay & Varga, 1993
- Auchmis incognita Ronkay & Varga, 1990
- Auchmis indica (Walker, 1865)
- Auchmis inextricata (Moore, 1881)
- Auchmis isolata Hacker, 1999
- Auchmis manfredi Hreblay & Ronkay, 1998
- Auchmis martini Ronkay & Varga, 1997
- Auchmis mongolica (Staudinger, 1896)
- Auchmis opulenta Hreblay & Ronkay, 1998
- Auchmis paucinotata (Hampson, 1894)
- Auchmis peterseni (Christoph, 1887)
- Auchmis poliorhiza (Hampson, 1902)
- Auchmis restricta (Sukhareva, 1976)
- Auchmis ronkayi Hacker & Weigert, 1990
- Auchmis saga (Butler, 1878)
- Auchmis subdetersa (Staudinger, 1895)
