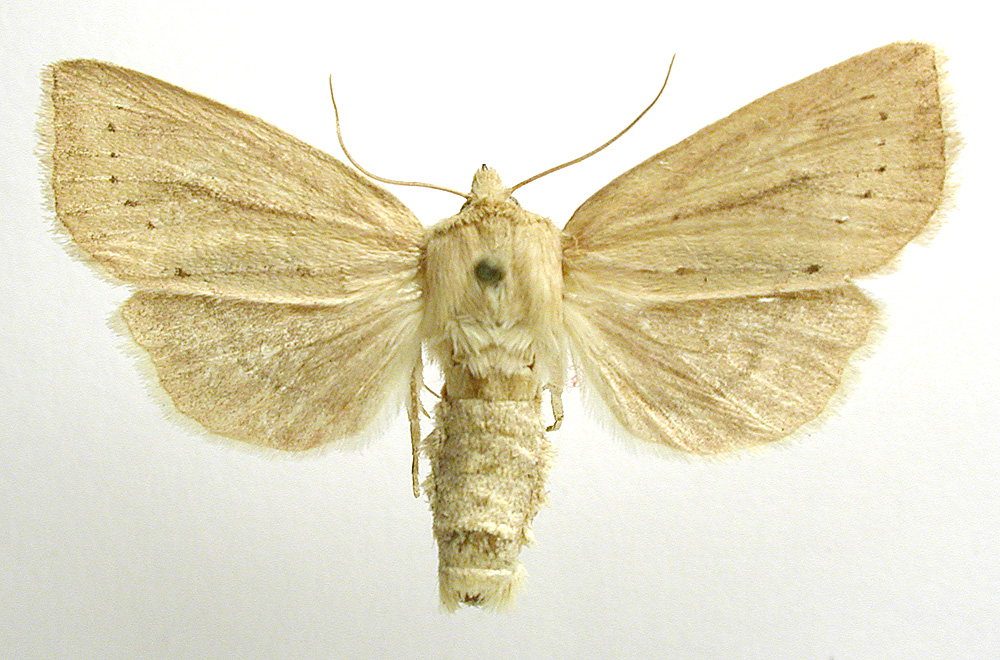

Scientific classification
- Domain: Eukaryota
- Kingdom: Animalia
- Phylum: Arthropoda
- Class: Insecta
- Order: Lepidoptera
- Superfamily: Noctuoidea
- Family: Noctuidae
- Genus: Globia
- Species: G. algae

Binomial name
- Globia algae (Esper, 1789)

Synonyms
- Capsula algae; Archanara algae; Phalaena Noctua algae Esper, [1789]; Nonagria cannae Treitschke, 1825; Nonagria russa Eversmann, 1847

= Globia algae =

Rush wainscot

Species of moth

Globia algae, the rush wainscot, is a moth of the family Noctuidae. The species was first described by Eugenius Johann Christoph Esper in 1789. It is found in central and southern Europe (and very sporadically in north-western Europe), Turkey, Armenia, northern Caucasus, south-west Siberia.

The genus Capsula was renamed Globia because of a naming conflict with a mollusk.

== Technical description and variation ==
The wingspan is 32–45 mm. Forewing yellowish rufous, the rufous tint predominating in the male, the yellowish in the female; veins more or less tinged with grey; a dark smudge at lower angle of cell; an outer row of dark vein-dots; hindwing grey with a dark paler-edged outer line; a rare form, ab. liturata ab. nov. [Warren] has both lines complete and dentate throughout, the median vein thickly black; - in the Norfolk Fens a very dark form occurs, ab. fumata ab. nov. [Warren] with the wings, especially in the male, dark brown or black brown.

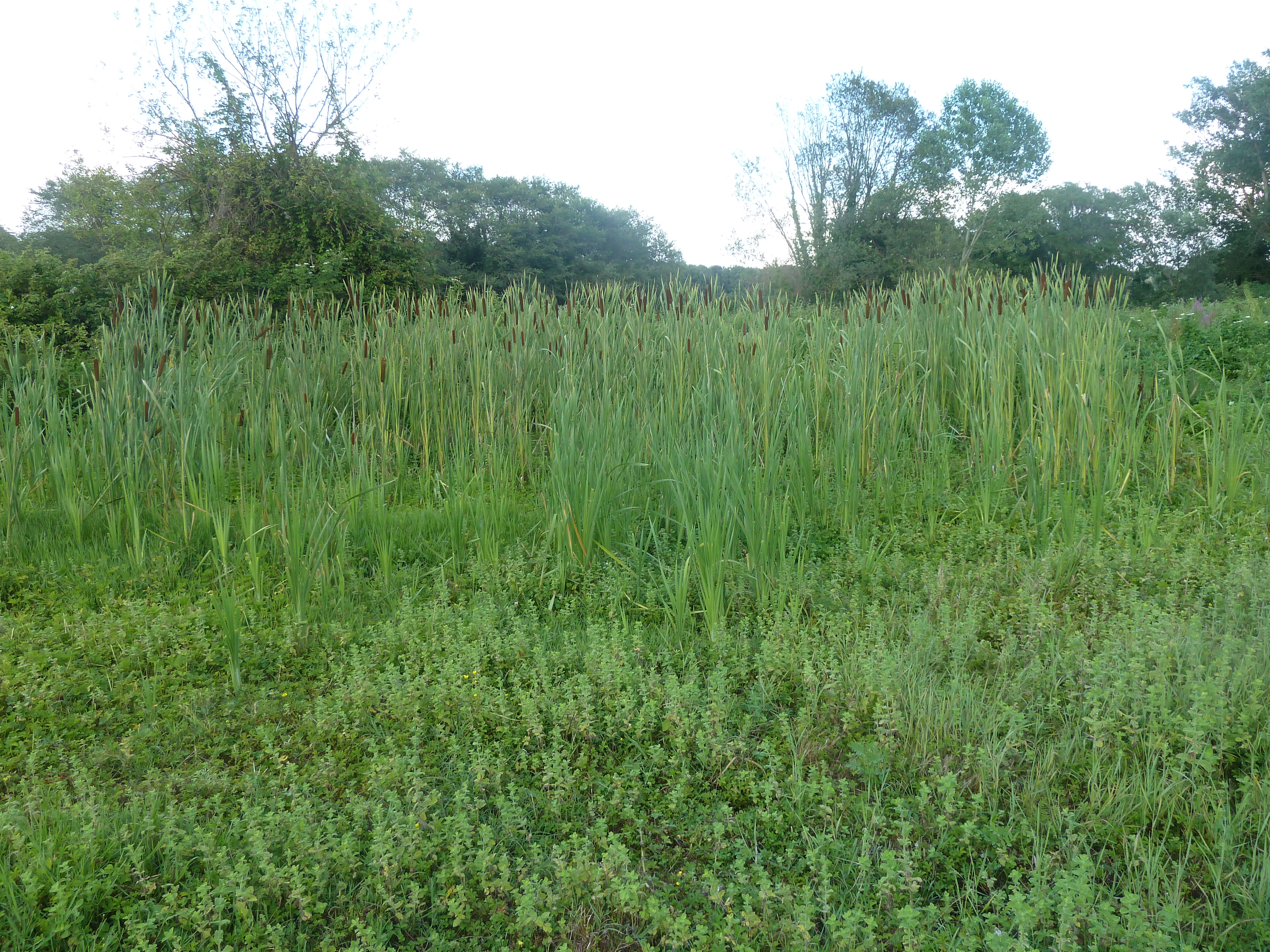
Habitat in Italy

== Biology ==
Adults are on wing from July to September depending on the location. There is one generation per year.

The larvae are greenish dotted with black; head brown; thoracic plate pale green. The larvae bore the stems of Scirpus lacustris, Typha species and Iris pseudacorus.
