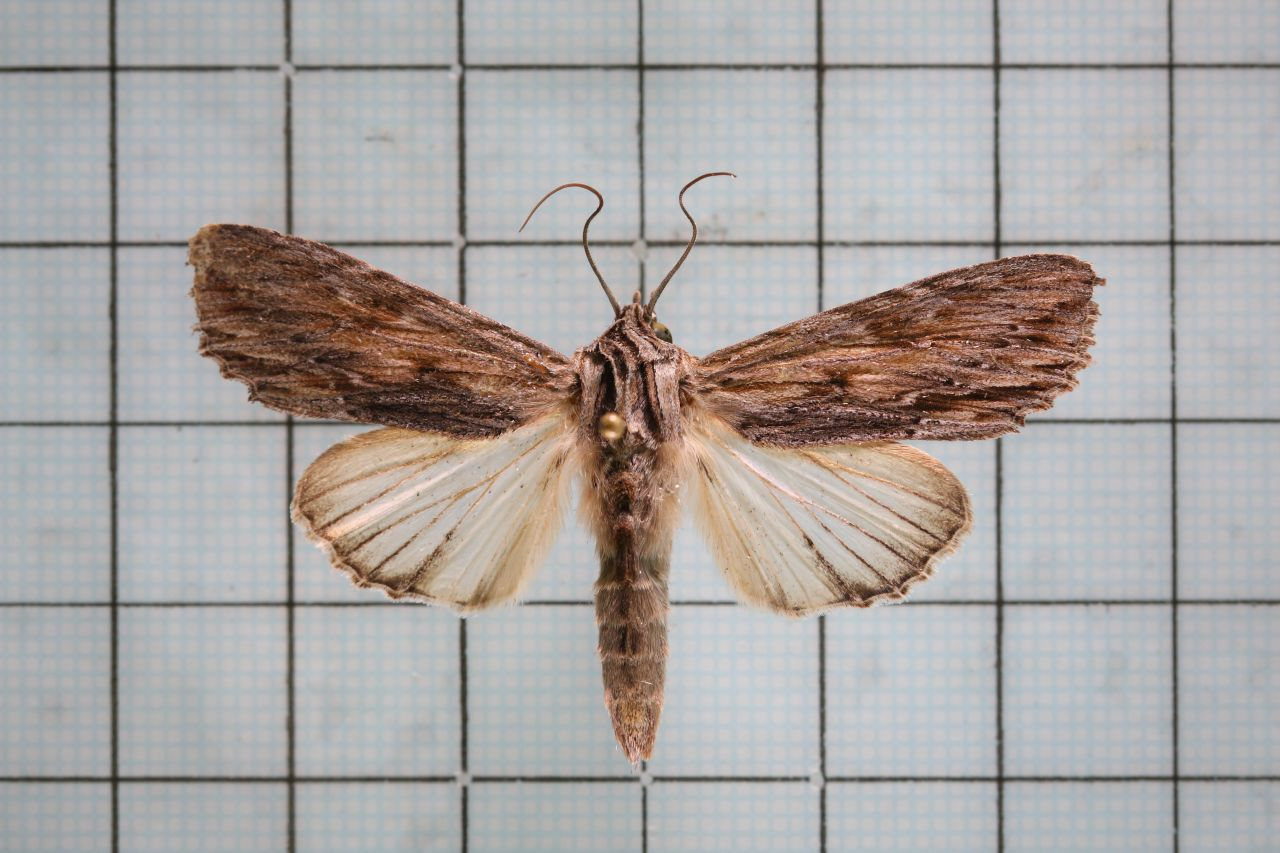

Scientific classification
- Domain: Eukaryota
- Kingdom: Animalia
- Phylum: Arthropoda
- Class: Insecta
- Order: Lepidoptera
- Superfamily: Noctuoidea
- Family: Noctuidae
- Genus: Auchmis
- Species: A. inextricata

Binomial name
- Auchmis inextricata (Moore, 1881)

Synonyms
- Rhizogramma inextricata Moore, 1881

= Auchmis inextricata =

Species of moth

Auchmis inextricata is a moth of the family Noctuidae first described by Frederic Moore in 1881. It is found in India, China and Taiwan.
