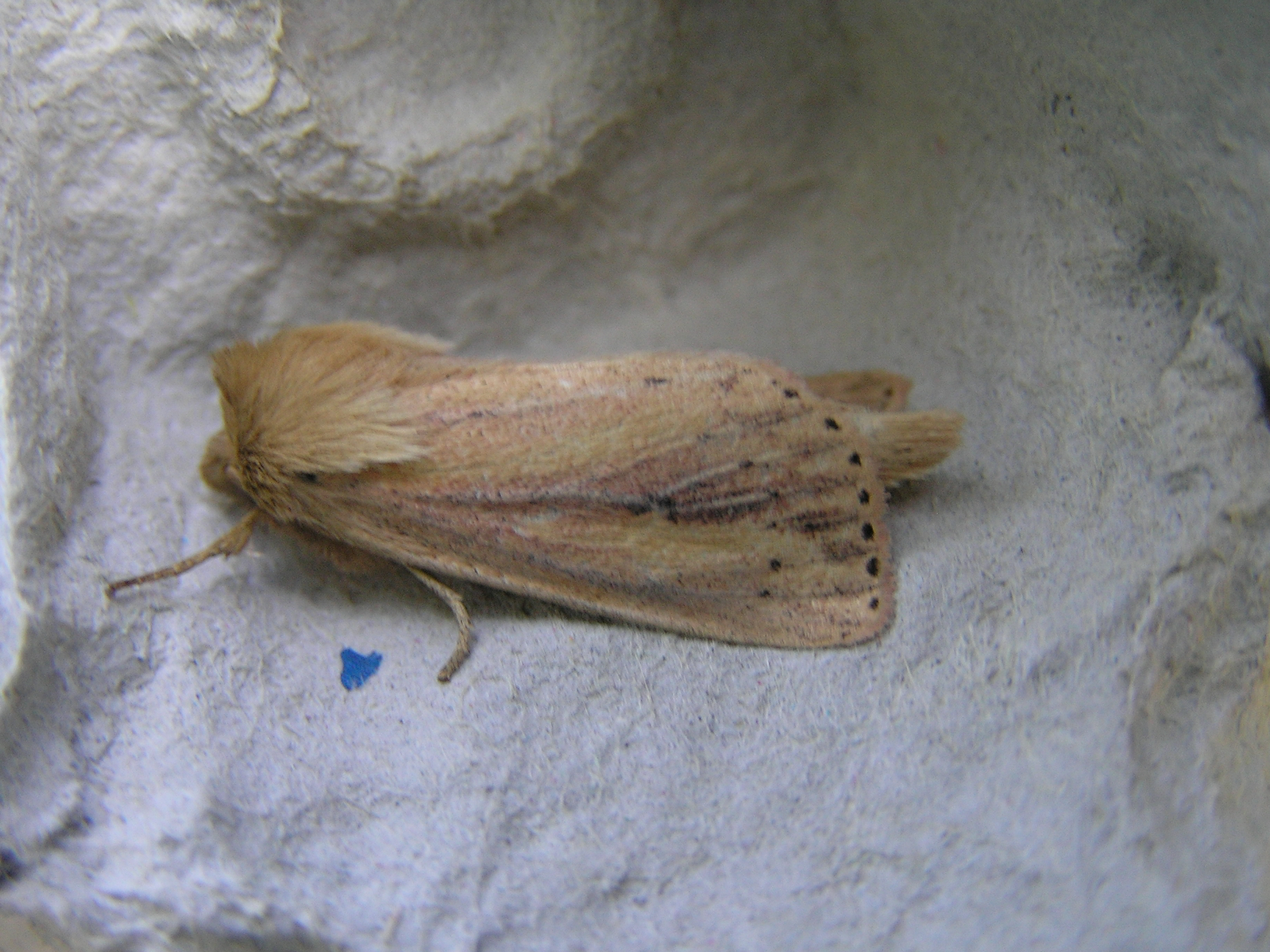

Scientific classification
- Kingdom: Animalia
- Phylum: Arthropoda
- Class: Insecta
- Order: Lepidoptera
- Superfamily: Noctuoidea
- Family: Noctuidae
- Subfamily: Noctuinae
- Tribe: Apameini
- Genus: Globia
- Species: G. sparganii

Binomial name
- Globia sparganii (Esper, 1790)

Synonyms
- Capsula sparganii; Archanara sparganii; Phalaena sparganii; Noctua sparganii

= Globia sparganii =

Species of moth

Globia sparganii, or Webb's wainscot, is a moth of the family Noctuidae. The species was first described by Eugenius Johann Christoph Esper in 1790. It is found in Europe, Central Asia, from southern Siberia to Manchuria, Korea, Turkey, Syria and Iran.

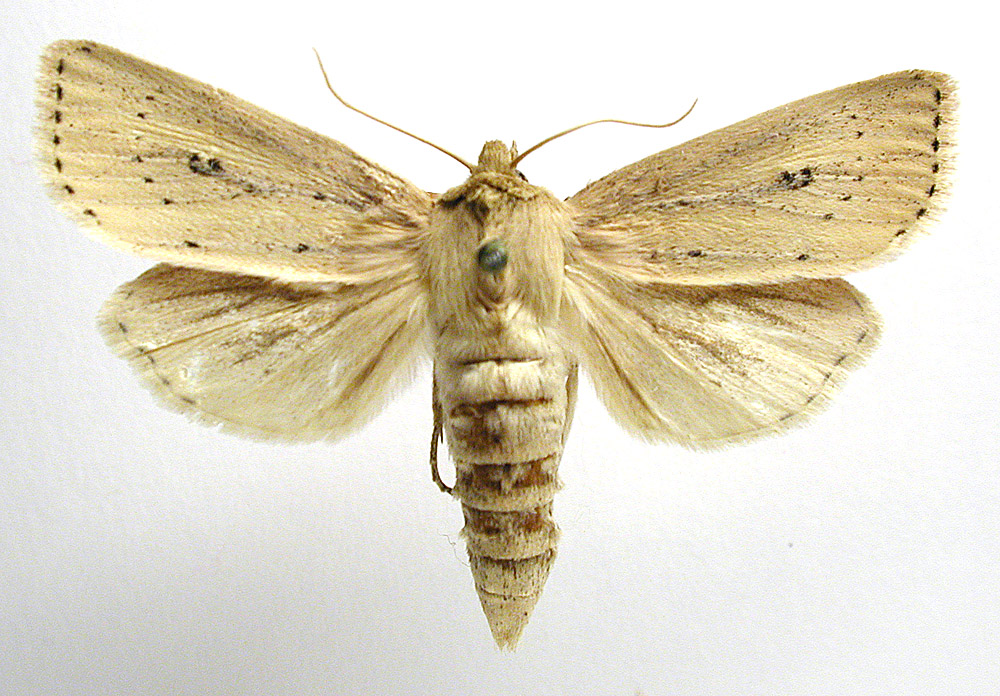
Mounted specimen

== Technical description and variation ==
The wingspan is 32–40 mm. Forewing light yellowish ochreous flushed with rufous, especially in the male; veins paler, and sprinkled with dark fuscous, especially the median vein; lines represented by series of black spots, the outer only distinct and complete; reniform stigma marked by two or more blackish dots at its lower end; a series of black terminal dots; hindwing pale dull yellowish, more or less suffused with fuscous, except towards inner and outer margins. The species is variable both in colour and clearness of markings; thus ab. obsoleta Tutt is an ochreous form dusted with grey and without any reddish or yellowish admixture; ab. rufescens Tutt has the forewing more or less strongly reddish and the hindwing suffused with fuscous to outer line; while ab. bipunctata Tutt has a black dash above median vein, representing the base of an otherwise unmarked orbicular stigma, as the black crescent with its pale centre at end of cell represents the reniform; this form is independent of colour.

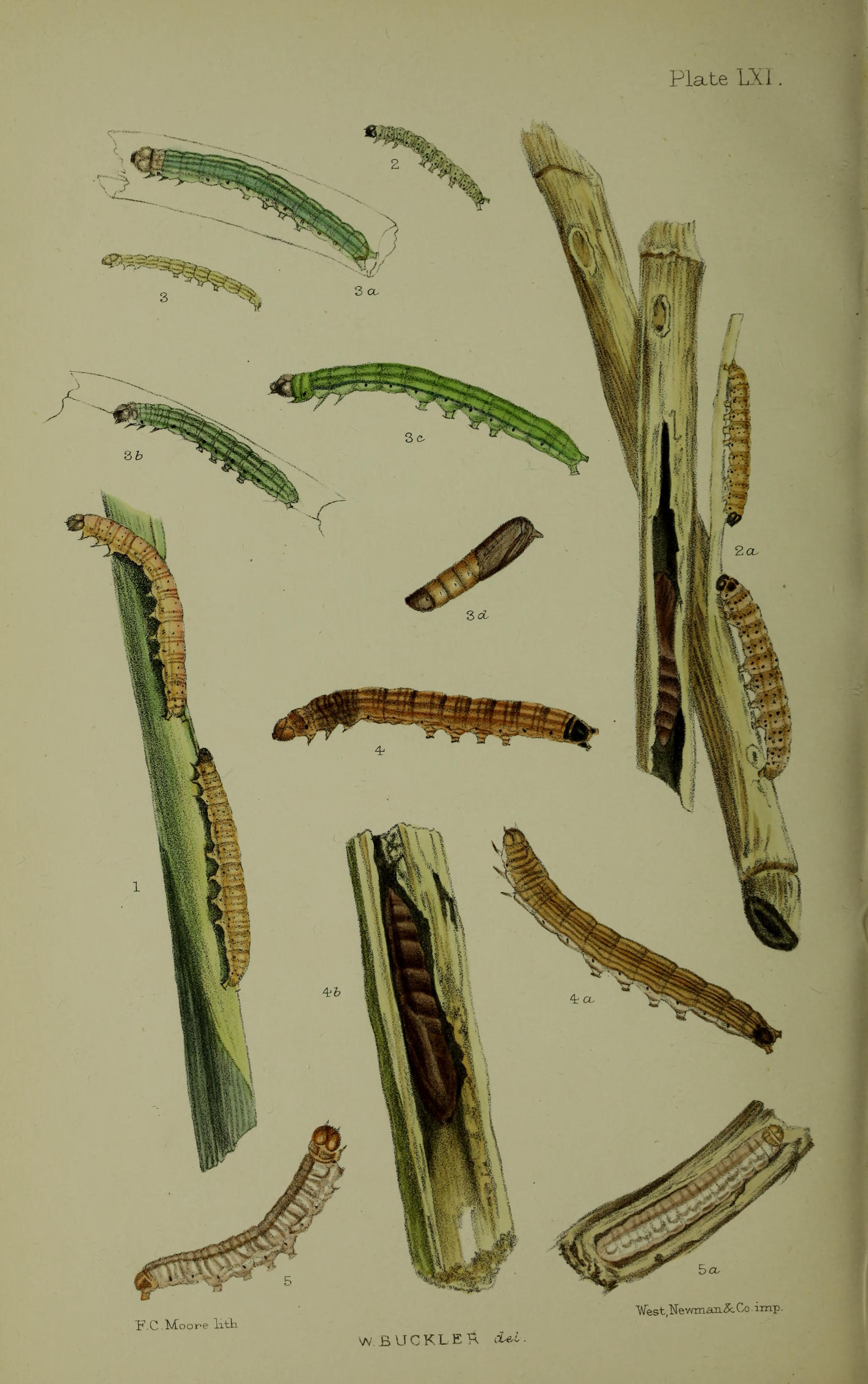
young larva 3a, 3b, 3c larvae after final moult 3d pupa

== Biology ==
The moth flies in one generation from July to October and are attracted to light.

Larvae are slender, pale yellow green; subdorsal and lateral lines darker; head and thoracic plate pale brown. They feed in the stems of Iris pseudacorus, Typha and similar watery plants.

== Subspecies ==
- Globia sparganii sparganii
- Globia sparganii algaeoides (Iran)

== Notes ==
1. The flight season refers to Belgium and the Netherlands. This may vary in other parts of the range.
