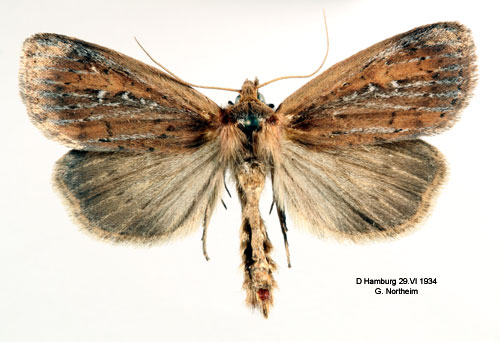

Scientific classification
- Kingdom: Animalia
- Phylum: Arthropoda
- Class: Insecta
- Order: Lepidoptera
- Superfamily: Noctuoidea
- Family: Noctuidae
- Genus: Archanara
- Species: A. neurica

Binomial name
- Archanara neurica (Hübner, 1808)

Synonyms
- Noctua neurica Hübner, [1808]; Nonagria edelsteni Tutt, 1908

= Archanara neurica =

White-mantled wainscot

Species of moth

Archanara neurica, the white-mantled wainscot, is a nocturnal moth of the family Noctuidae described by Jacob Hübner in 1808. It is found in Austria, Belgium, Bosnia and Herzegovina, Great Britain, Bulgaria, Croatia, the Czech Republic, Denmark, France, Germany, Hungary, Italy, Latvia, Liechtenstein, North Macedonia, Poland, Romania, Sicily, Slovakia, Slovenia, Switzerland, the Netherlands and Serbia. In the UK, its only regular sites are at RSPB Minsmere and Walberswick National Nature Reserve in Suffolk.

== Technical description and variation ==
A. neurica Hbn. (= edelsteni Tutt) (49 h).[Adults are predominantly light brown, with a pale fringe along the front edge of the thorax]. Forewing brownish fawn colour, hardly dusted with darker; no distinct dark streak along middle; edges of stigmata marked by pairs of black dots above and below, interrupted in cell; the upper half of each broader than the lower; (in arundineta this is not the case;) median vein marked with black and white scales; lower lobe of reniform not black, but some black scales above median vein on each side of it; inner and outer lines complete, the latter strongly lunulate-dentate; a row of black marginal lunules; hindwing brownish grey, with dark outer line and terminal border; tips of shoulders white; underside without cellspots or other markings. Larva dull bluish green, with 3 faint pale grey dorsal lines and fine black tubercles; spiracles black; head black-brown; thoracic plate yellowish brown with darker edge and dots. The wingspan is 26–29 mm.

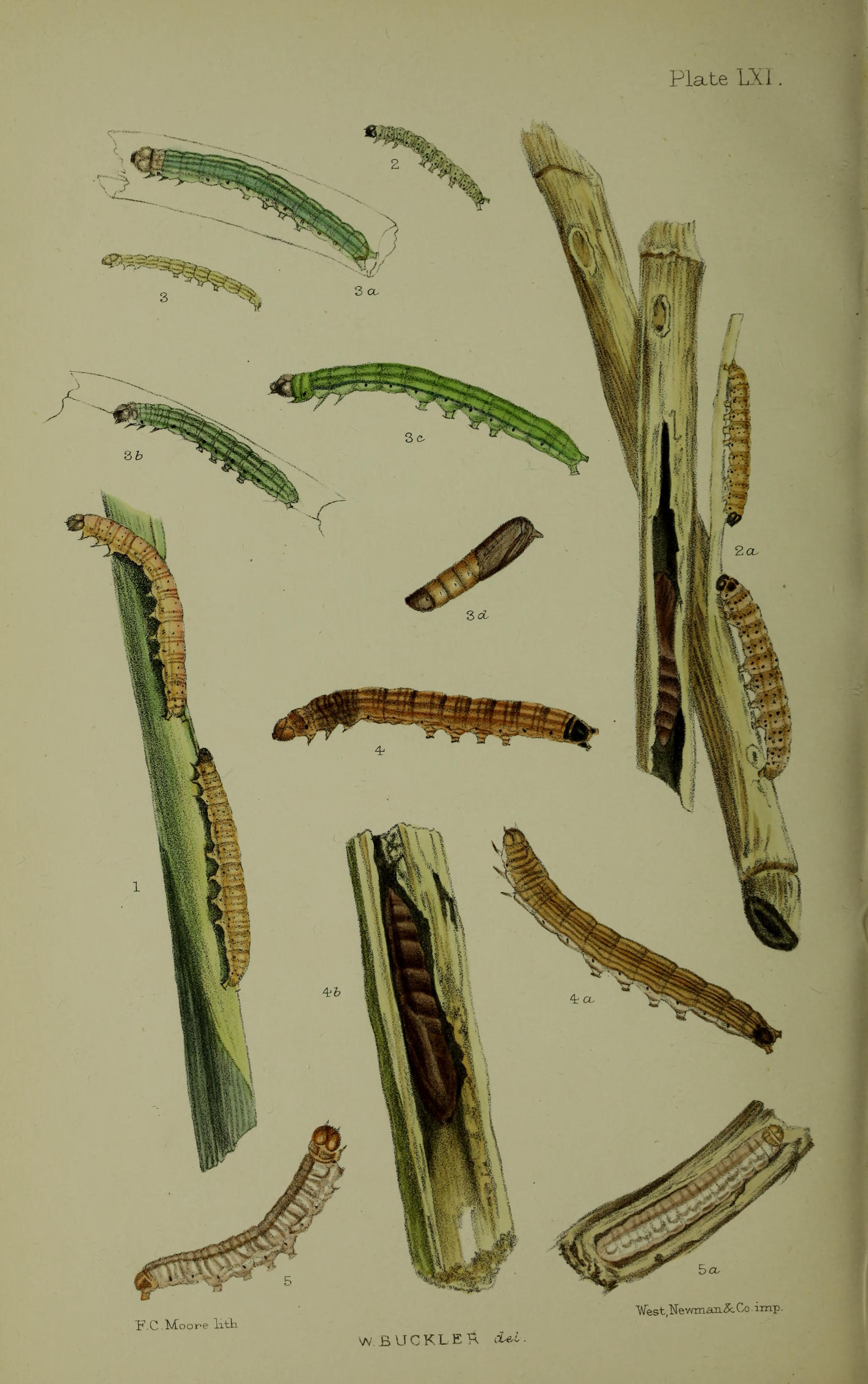
Figs 1 larva after last moult on stem of reed

== Biology ==
Adults are on wing in July and August in one generation in western Europe.

The eggs overwinter and hatch into larvae that feed on common reed species, including Phragmites communis and Phalaris arundinacea. They feed internally in the stems of their host plant.
