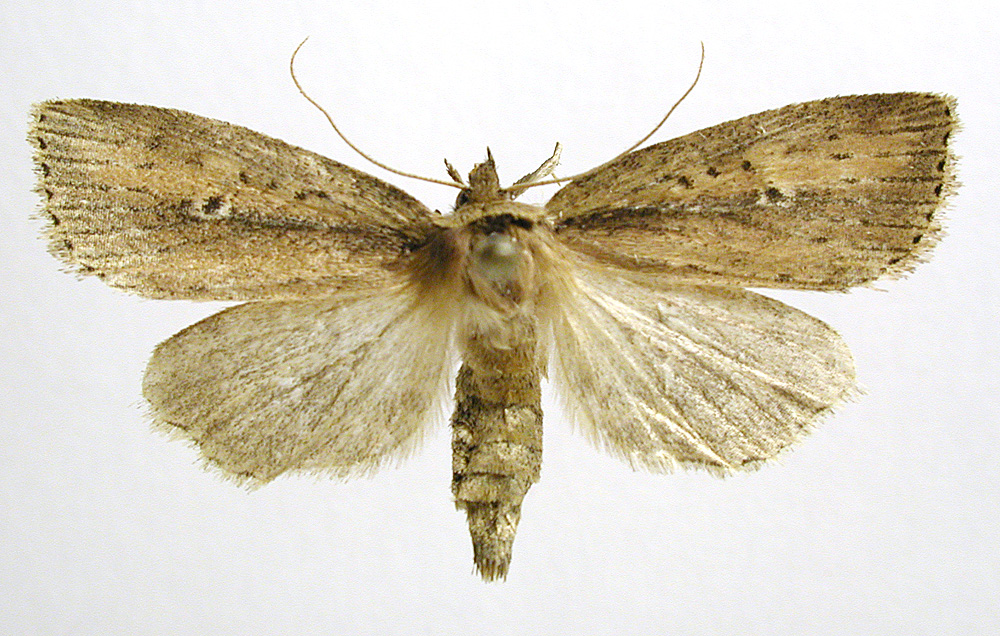

Scientific classification
- Domain: Eukaryota
- Kingdom: Animalia
- Phylum: Arthropoda
- Class: Insecta
- Order: Lepidoptera
- Superfamily: Noctuoidea
- Family: Noctuidae
- Genus: Archanara
- Species: A. dissoluta

Binomial name
- Archanara dissoluta (Treitschke, 1825)

Synonyms
- Nonagria dissoluta Treitschke, 1825; Nonagria hessei Boisduval, 1840; Nonagria arundineta Schmidt, 1858

= Archanara dissoluta =

Brown-veined wainscot

Species of moth

Archanara dissoluta, the brown-veined wainscot, is a moth of the family Noctuidae. The species was first described by Georg Friedrich Treitschke in 1825. It is found in most of Europe (except Iceland, Slovenia and Croatia), east into Russia and Siberia.

== Description ==
The wingspan is 27–33 mm. It was first described as a comparatively rare dark-reddish suffused form of the much commoner and paler arundineta Schmidt [now synonym of dissoluta]; the more general form, at least in Britain, has the forewing greyish ochreous dusted with fuscous, the two folds with a slight reddish tinge, separated by a black streak from base below cell, which runs as a more diffuse shade sometimes to termen; veins often dark grey or blackish; outer line represented by black vein-dashes; the upper stigmata interrupted in middle by the reddish tint of the cell; their upper portions marked by black dots; the lower lobe of reniform filled with black and edged with white scales, sometimes complete throughout; a series of black marginal lunules; hindwing dirty grey; the female is paler, narrower winged, without any red tinge, dusted with grey instead of fuscous, without the strong black median streak; the two folds olive fawn colour; the black in lower lobe of reniform strong and edged with white; the hindwing paler, showing more clearly a dark outer line and terminal shade; the underside of both wings with a distinct dark cell spot.

== Biology ==
Adults are on wing from July to September.

The larvae feed internally on the stems of the common reed (Phragmites australis) and pupation takes place within the stem.

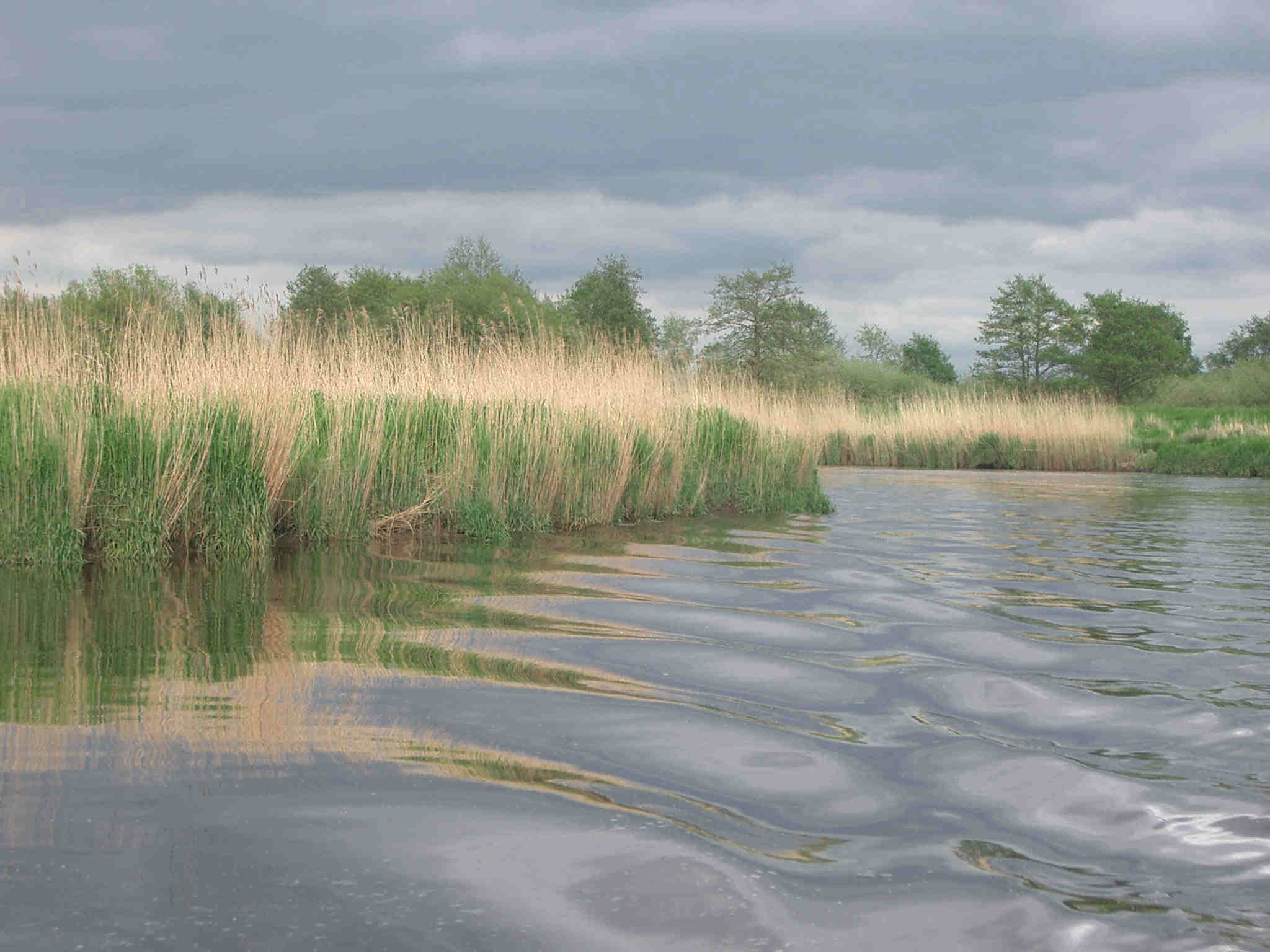
Habitat, Germany

== Habitat ==
Reed beds.
