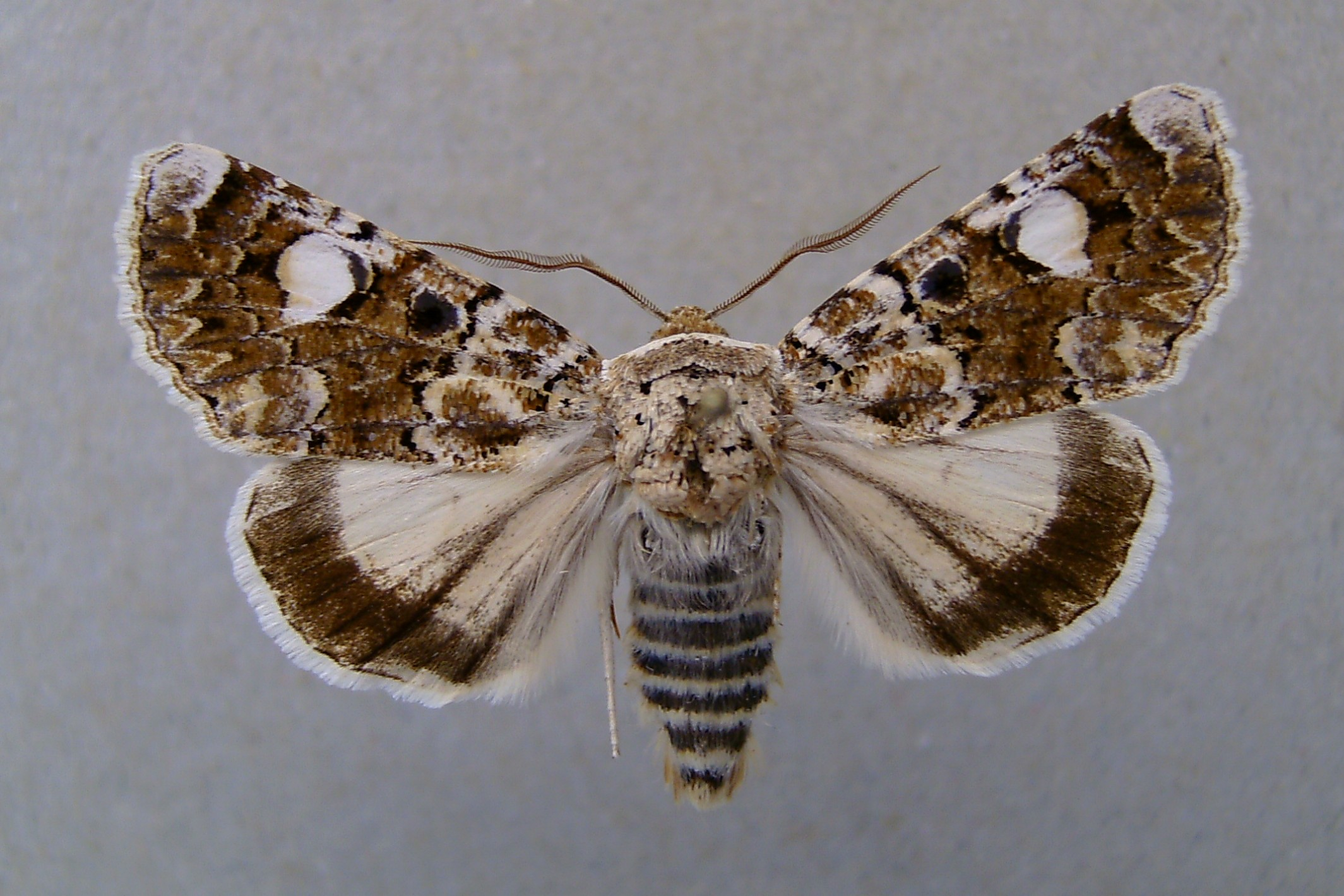
- Oxytripia orbiculosa

Scientific classification
- Domain: Eukaryota
- Kingdom: Animalia
- Phylum: Arthropoda
- Class: Insecta
- Order: Lepidoptera
- Superfamily: Noctuoidea
- Family: Noctuidae
- Subfamily: Noctuinae
- Genus: Oxytripia; Staudinger, 1871

= Oxytripia =

Genus of moths

Oxytripia is a genus of moths of the family Noctuidae.

== Species ==
- Oxytripia orbiculosa (Esper, [1800])
- Oxytripia stephania Sutton, 1964
