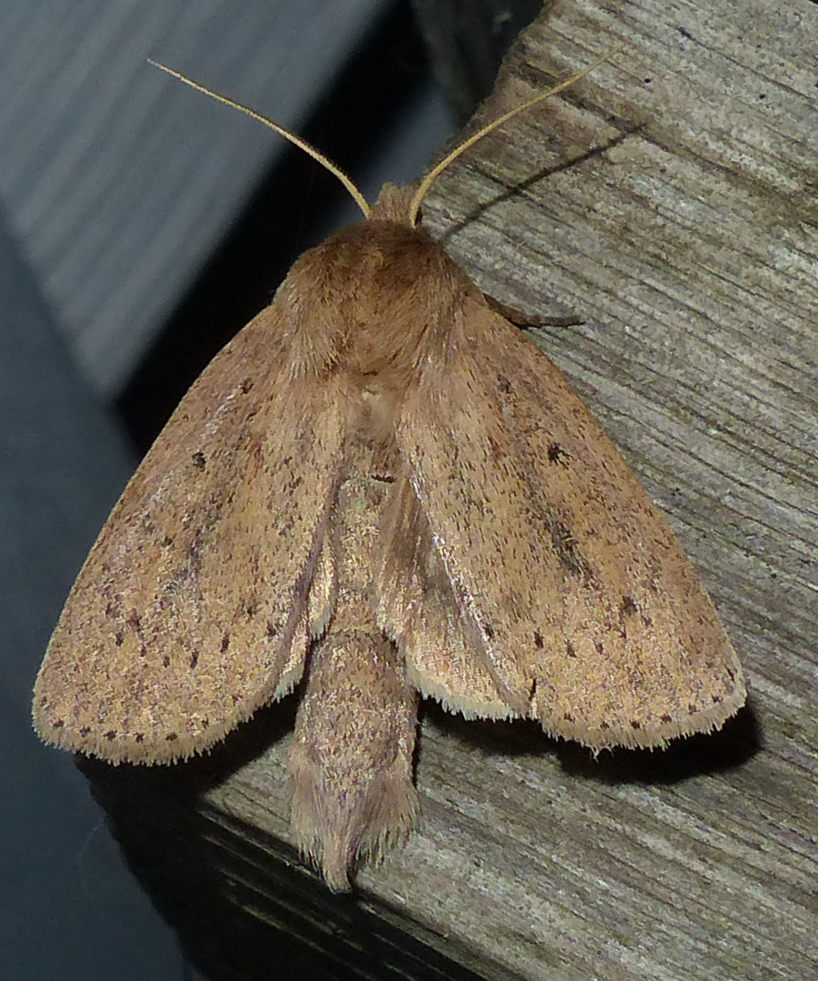
- Globia oblonga, oblong sedge borer, New York

Scientific classification
- Domain: Eukaryota
- Kingdom: Animalia
- Phylum: Arthropoda
- Class: Insecta
- Order: Lepidoptera
- Superfamily: Noctuoidea
- Family: Noctuidae
- Subfamily: Noctuinae
- Tribe: Apameini
- Genus: Globia; Fibiger, Zilli, Ronkay & Goldstein, 2010

Synonyms
- Capsula

= Globia =

Genus of moths

Globia is a genus of moths called "arches", in the family Noctuidae. There are about seven described species in Globia. They are found in the holarctic.

This genus was formerly called Capsula, but the name was replaced with Globia because of a naming conflict with a mollusk. Prior to that, the species were classified in the genus Archanara.

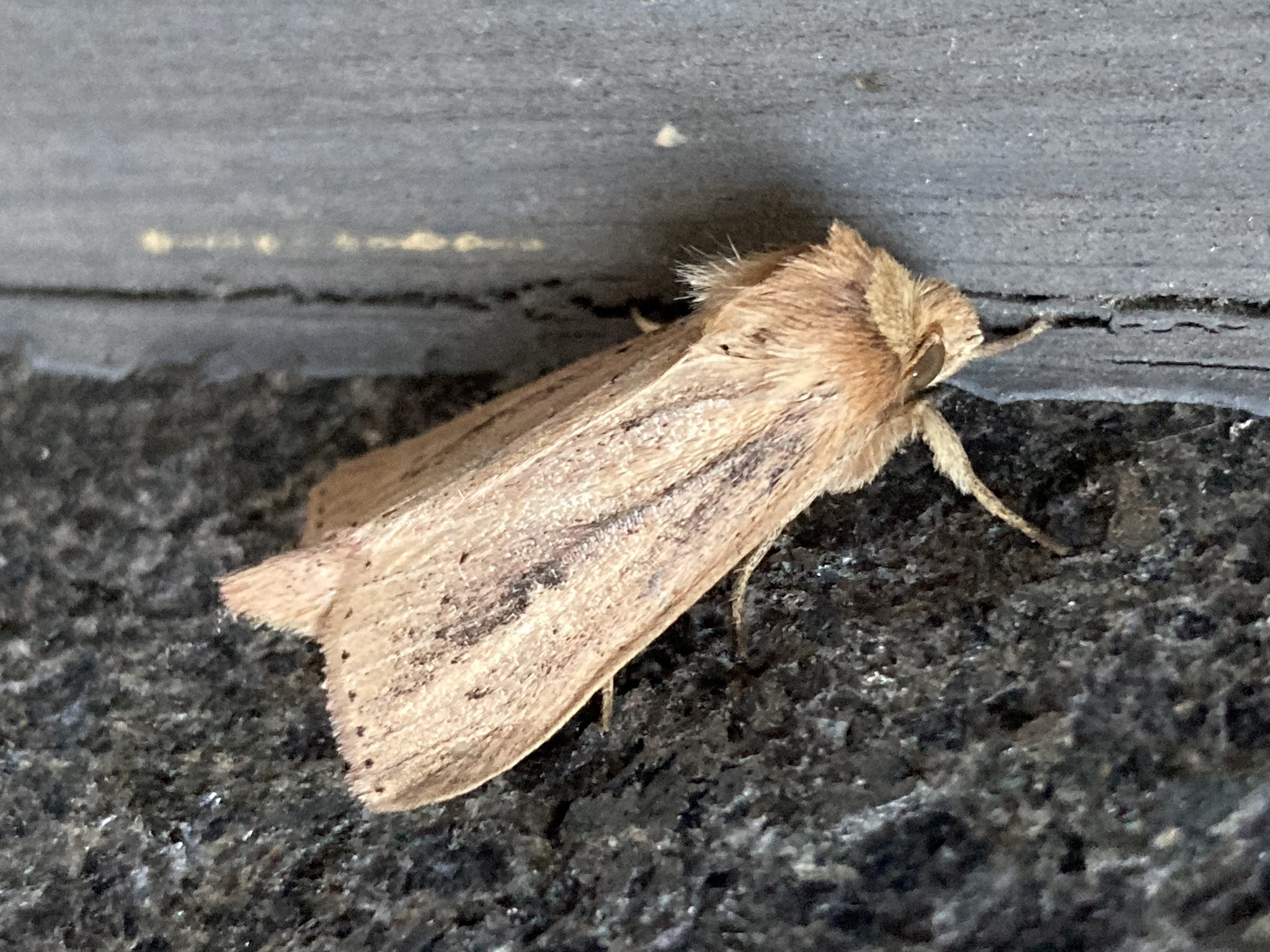
Globia sparganii, Webb's wainscot, Finland

== Species ==
These seven species belong to the genus Globia:

- Globia aerata (Butler, 1878)
- Globia alameda (Smith, 1903)
- Globia algae (Esper, 1789) (rush wainscot)
- Globia laeta (Morrison, 1875)
- Globia oblonga (Grote, 1882) (oblong sedge borer)
- Globia sparganii (Esper, 1790) (Webb's wainscot)
- Globia subflava (Grote, 1882) (subflava sedge borer)
