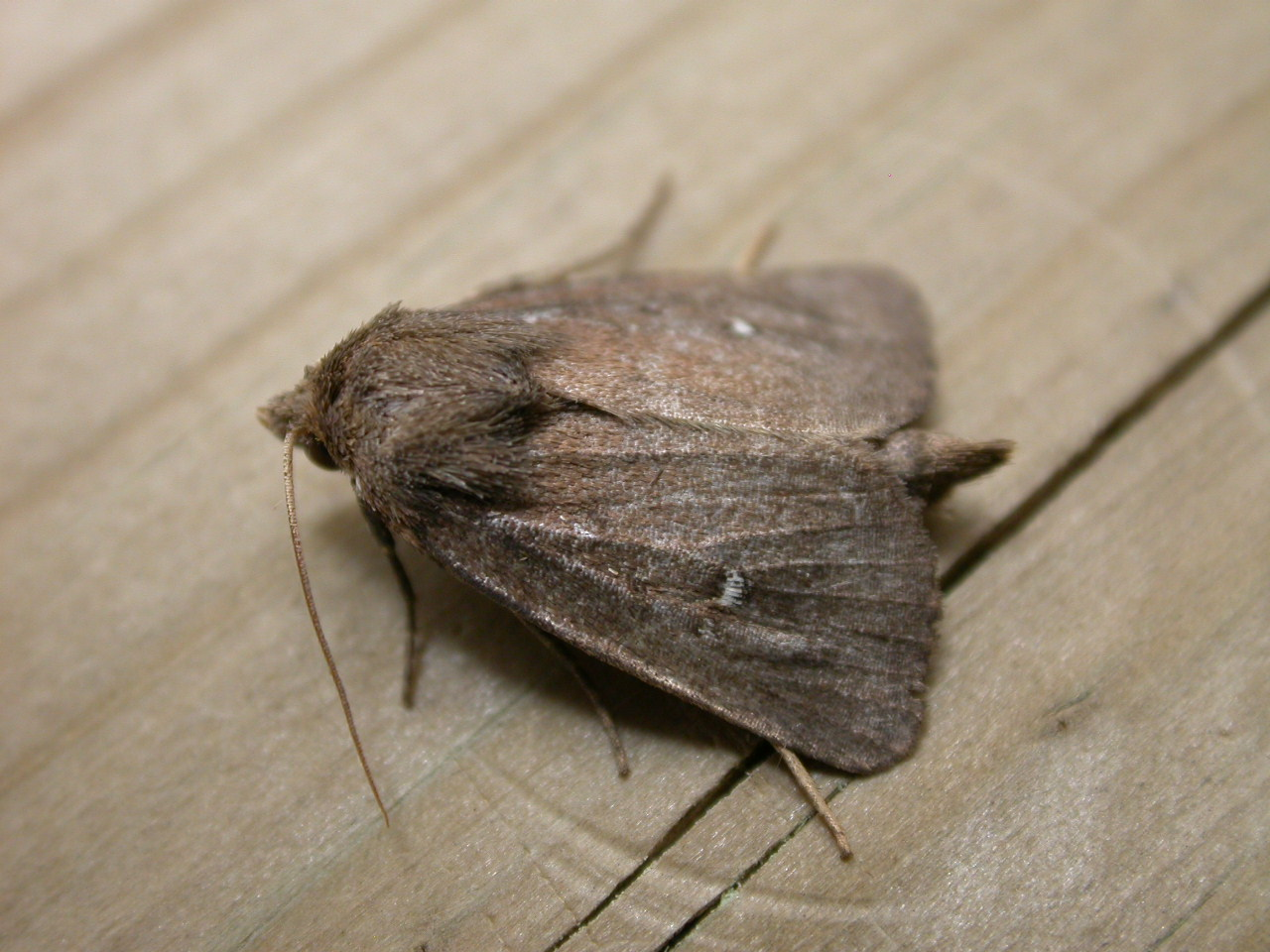

Scientific classification
- Domain: Eukaryota
- Kingdom: Animalia
- Phylum: Arthropoda
- Class: Insecta
- Order: Lepidoptera
- Superfamily: Noctuoidea
- Family: Noctuidae
- Genus: Archanara
- Species: A. geminipuncta

Binomial name
- Archanara geminipuncta (Haworth, 1809)

Synonyms
- Lenisa geminipuncta

= Archanara geminipuncta =

Species of moth

Archanara geminipuncta, the twin-spotted wainscot, is a moth of the family Noctuidae which is found in Europe, Lebanon, Israel, Turkey, Iraq and the Caucasus. The species was first described by Adrian Hardy Haworth in 1809.

== Technical description and variation ==
A. geminipuncta Haw. (= guttans Hbn., paludicola Hbn. f. 637, arundinis Sepp.) (49 g). Forewing reddish fuscous, with a broad paler space along the inner margin; the reniform stigma with two white spots; hindwing fuscous; the ground colour is very variable; — in ab. pallida Tutt it is reddish-or greyish ochreous; in rufa Tutt uniform reddish brown; and in nigricans Stgr. (= fusca Tutt) (49 g) sooty-black; from another point of view, the reniform stigma may contain, only one, — the lower, — white spot, or neither; ab. unipuncta Tutt (49 h) and ab. obsoleta Tutt (49 g) respectively; ab. paludicola Hbn. f. 624, if the figure is not exaggerated, represents a dark reddish brown specimen, with the median and costal veins white; a small black orbicular stigma and large black reniform with a white lunule on its inner edge; and all the veins white before termen; the hindwing grey, with paler base and a dark cellspot. Larva pinkish ochreous; the spiracular line paler; head dark brown. Its wingspan is 27–32 mm.

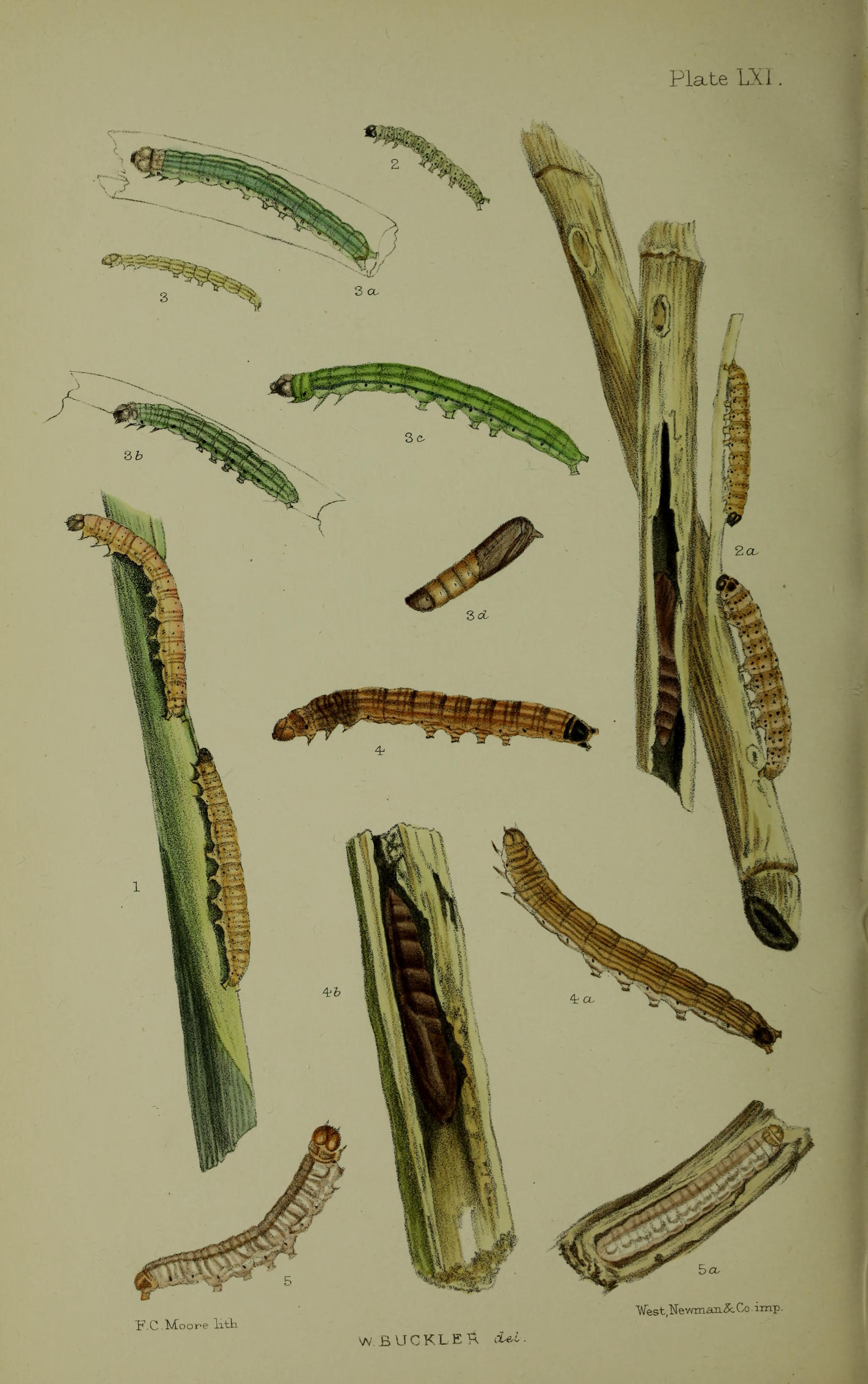
2 young larva 2a larvae after final moult, the pupa is seen inside the hollow stem

== Biology ==
The moth flies from June to October depending on location. The larvae feed on Phragmites species.
