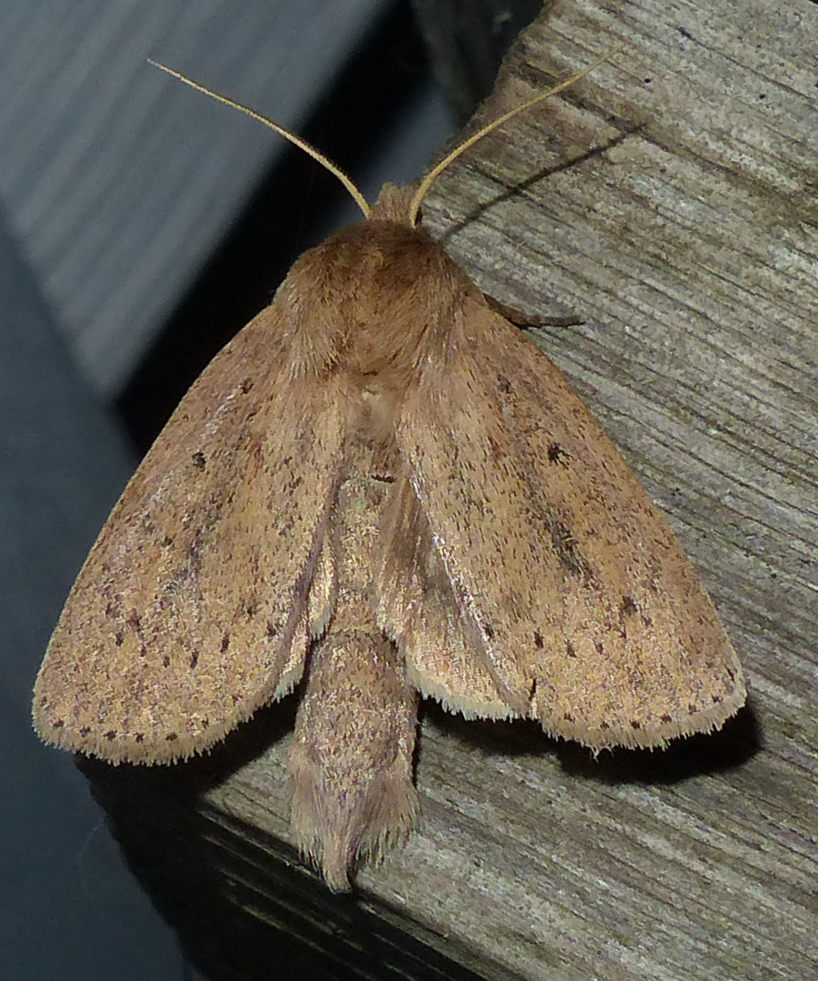
- Globia oblonga, oblong sedge borer, New York

Scientific classification
- Domain: Eukaryota
- Kingdom: Animalia
- Phylum: Arthropoda
- Class: Insecta
- Order: Lepidoptera
- Superfamily: Noctuoidea
- Family: Noctuidae
- Subfamily: Noctuinae
- Tribe: Apameini
- Genus: Globia
- Species: G. oblonga

Binomial name
- Globia oblonga Grote, 1882

Synonyms
- Capsula oblonga (Grote, 1882); Archanara oblonga; Nonagria oblonga; Nonagria permagna; Nonagria subcarnea

= Globia oblonga =

Species of moth

Globia oblonga, the oblong sedge borer, is a moth of the family Noctuidae. The species was first described by Augustus Radcliffe Grote in 1882. It is found in parts of Canada and the United States

The wingspan is 35–50 mm. Adults are on wing from June to September depending on the location. There is one generation per year.

The larvae initially leaf mine and later bore the stems of Typha and Scirpus species below the water line.

This species was formerly in the genus Capsula, but Capsula was renamed Globia because of a naming conflict with a mollusk.

== Range ==
The range of the oblong sedge borer includes Southern Canada, notably the area between British Columbia and the Maritimes, The Gulf of Mexico, and Southern California.
