= Catocala detrita =

Scientific classification
- Kingdom: Animalia
- Phylum: Arthropoda
- Class: Insecta
- Order: Lepidoptera
- Superfamily: Noctuoidea
- Family: Erebidae
- Genus: Catocala
- Species: C. detrita

Binomial name
- Catocala detrita Warren, 1913

Synonyms
- Catocala lupina detrita Warren, 1913

Species of moth

Catocala detrita is a moth in the family Erebidae first described by Warren in 1913. It is found in the Ural Mountains of Russia.

The larvae possibly feed on Salix species.
