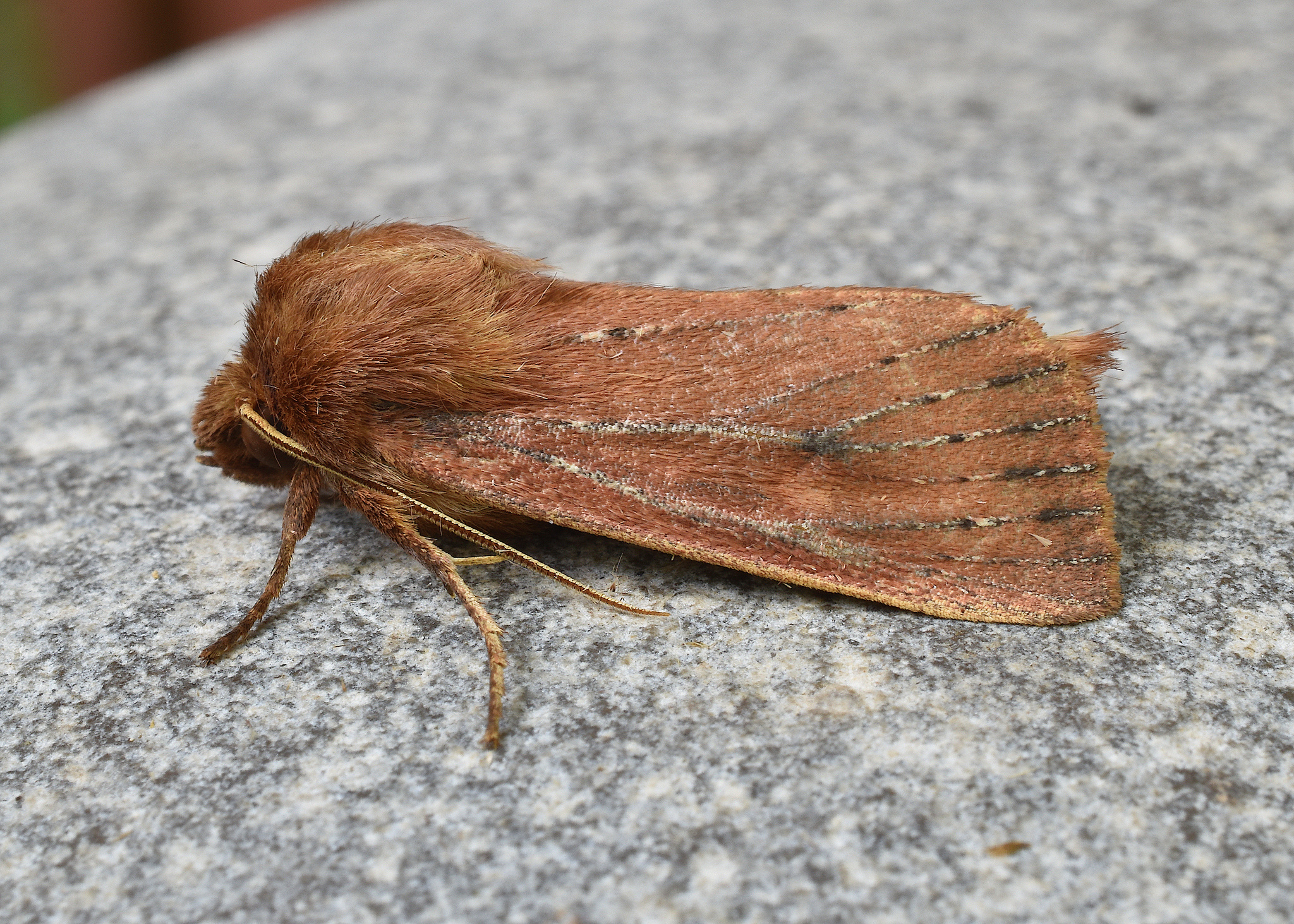
- Globia subflava, subflava sedge borer, Canada

Scientific classification
- Kingdom: Animalia
- Phylum: Arthropoda
- Class: Insecta
- Order: Lepidoptera
- Superfamily: Noctuoidea
- Family: Noctuidae
- Subfamily: Noctuinae
- Tribe: Apameini
- Genus: Globia
- Species: G. subflava

Binomial name
- Globia subflava Grote, 1882

Synonyms
- Capsula subflava (Grote, 1882); Archanara subflava; Nonagria subflava

= Globia subflava =

Species of moth

Globia subflava, the subflava sedge borer or yellow sedge borer, is a moth of the family Noctuidae. The species was first described by Augustus Radcliffe Grote in 1882. It is found in North America from Nova Scotia west to British Columbia, south to New Jersey in the east and Utah and California in the west.

The wingspan is 35–40 mm. Adults are on wing in July depending on the location. There is one generation per year.

The larvae bore the stems of Typha and Scirpus species.
