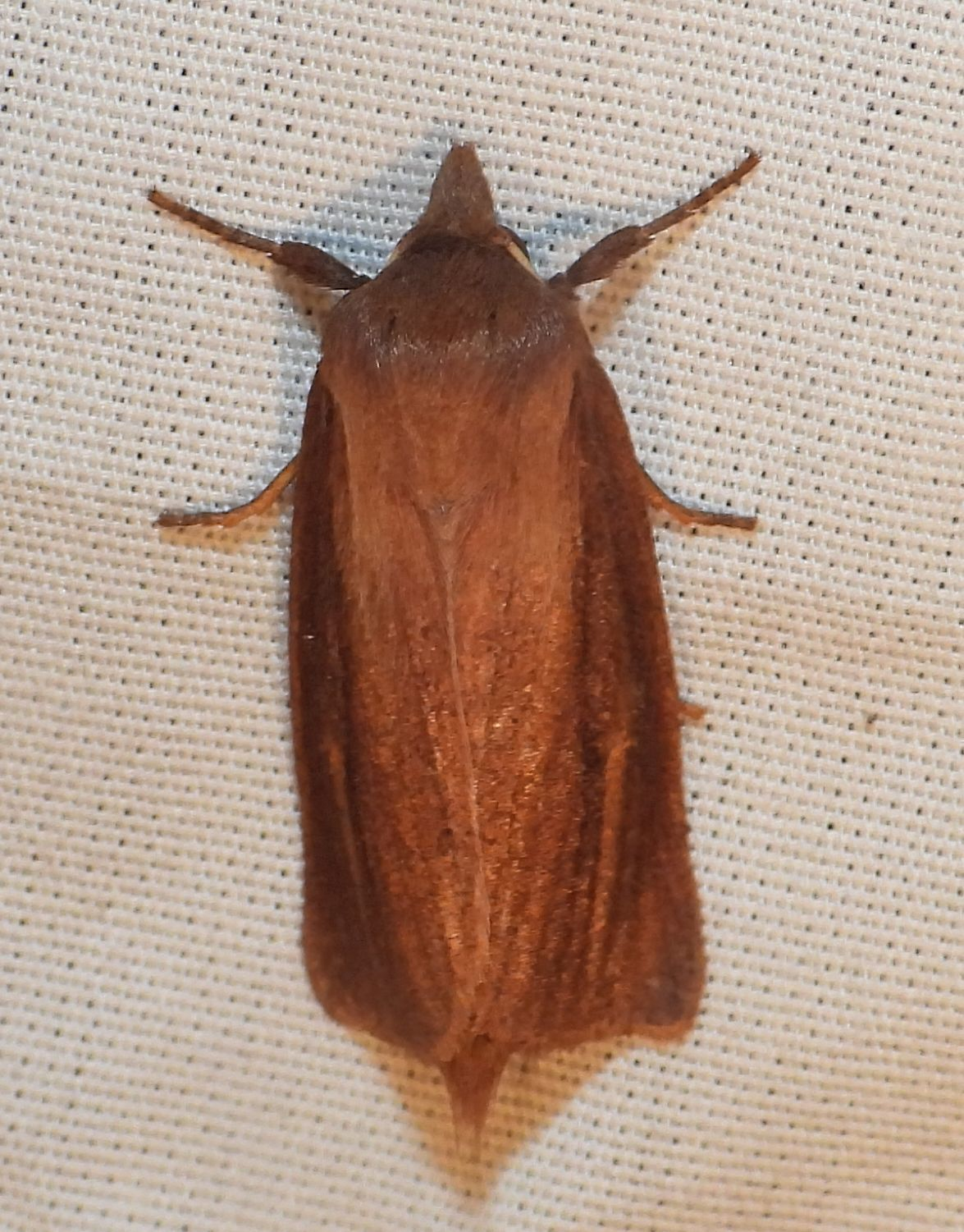
- Globia laeta, Canada

Scientific classification
- Domain: Eukaryota
- Kingdom: Animalia
- Phylum: Arthropoda
- Class: Insecta
- Order: Lepidoptera
- Superfamily: Noctuoidea
- Family: Noctuidae
- Genus: Globia
- Species: G. laeta

Binomial name
- Globia laeta Morrison, 1875

Synonyms
- Capsula laeta (Morrison, 1875); Nonagria laeta; Archanara laeta

= Globia laeta =

Species of moth

Globia laeta, the red sedge borer, is a moth of the family Noctuidae. The species was first described by Herbert Knowles Morrison in 1875. It is found in North America, including Ohio, Illinois, New Jersey and Ontario.

The wingspan is about 28 mm. Adults are on wing from July to September depending on the location.

The larvae bore the stems of Sparganium species.

This species was formerly in the genus Capsula, but Capsula was renamed Globia because of a naming conflict with a mollusk.
