= Eugenius Johann Christoph Esper =

German naturalist (1742–1810)

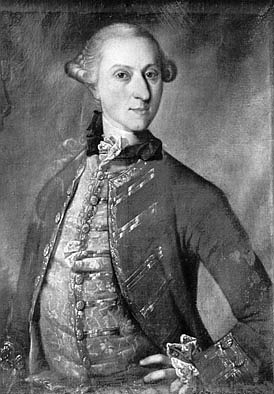
Eugen Johann Christoph Esper

Eugenius Johann Christoph Esper (2 June 1742 – 27 July 1810) was a German zoologist and naturalist. Born in Wunsiedel in Bavaria, he was professor of zoology at Erlangen university.

== Life and work ==
Eugen and his brother Friedrich were introduced to natural history at an early age by their father Friedrich Lorenz Esper, an amateur botanist. Encouraged to abandon his theology course by his professor of botany Casimir Christoph Schmidel (1718–1792) Eugen Esper, instead, took instruction in natural history.

He obtained his doctorate of philosophy at the university of Erlangen in 1781 with a thesis entitled De varietatibus specierum in naturale productis. The following year, he started to teach at the university initially as extraordinary professor, a poorly paid position, then in 1797 as the professor of philosophy. He directed the department of natural history in Erlangen from 1805. Thanks to him the university collections of minerals, birds, plants, shells and insects grew very rapidly.

During his leisure hours Esper devoted himself to the study of nature and the preparation of manuscripts relating to natural history. He was the author of a series of booklets entitled Die Schmetterlinge in Abbildungen nach der Natur mit Beschreibungen which were published between 1776 and 1807. These were richly illustrated; minerals, birds, plants, shells and insects being presented on 438 hand-coloured plates. A second work was published in 1829–1830 with Toussaint de Charpentier (1779–1847). This is an important work on the butterflies of Germany, following the Linnean System. Esper was also the first person to research palaeopathology.

He was elected as a member of the German National Academy of Sciences Leopoldina in 1789.

The review of entomology, Esperiana, Buchreihe zur Entomologie, created in 1990, commemorates his name and work.

Esper's collection is in the Zoologische Staatssammlung München and the Museum Wiesbaden
