= List of Lepidoptera of Bosnia and Herzegovina =

Location of Bosnia and Herzegovina

Lepidoptera of Bosnia and Herzegovina consist of both the butterflies and moths recorded from Bosnia and Herzegovina.

== Butterflies ==
=== Hesperiidae ===
- Carcharodus alceae (Esper, 1780)
- Carcharodus floccifera (Zeller, 1847)
- Carcharodus lavatherae (Esper, 1783)
- Carterocephalus palaemon (Pallas, 1771)
- Erynnis tages (Linnaeus, 1758)
- Hesperia comma (Linnaeus, 1758)
- Heteropterus morpheus (Pallas, 1771)
- Ochlodes sylvanus (Esper, 1777)
- Pyrgus alveus (Hübner, 1803)
- Pyrgus andromedae (Wallengren, 1853)
- Pyrgus armoricanus (Oberthur, 1910)
- Pyrgus carthami (Hübner, 1813)
- Pyrgus malvae (Linnaeus, 1758)
- Pyrgus serratulae (Rambur, 1839)
- Pyrgus sidae (Esper, 1784)
- Spialia orbifer (Hübner, 1823)
- Spialia sertorius (Hoffmannsegg, 1804)
- Thymelicus acteon (Rottemburg, 1775)
- Thymelicus lineola (Ochsenheimer, 1808)
- Thymelicus sylvestris (Poda, 1761)

=== Lycaenidae ===
- Agriades dardanus (Freyer, 1844)
- Aricia agestis (Denis & Schiffermuller, 1775)
- Aricia anteros (Freyer, 1838)
- Aricia artaxerxes (Fabricius, 1793)
- Callophrys rubi (Linnaeus, 1758)
- Celastrina argiolus (Linnaeus, 1758)
- Cupido minimus (Fuessly, 1775)
- Cupido osiris (Meigen, 1829)
- Cupido alcetas (Hoffmannsegg, 1804)
- Cupido argiades (Pallas, 1771)
- Cupido decolorata (Staudinger, 1886)
- Cyaniris semiargus (Rottemburg, 1775)
- Eumedonia eumedon (Esper, 1780)
- Favonius quercus (Linnaeus, 1758)
- Glaucopsyche alexis (Poda, 1761)
- Iolana iolas (Ochsenheimer, 1816)
- Lampides boeticus (Linnaeus, 1767)
- Leptotes pirithous (Linnaeus, 1767)
- Lycaena alciphron (Rottemburg, 1775)
- Lycaena candens (Herrich-Schäffer, 1844)
- Lycaena dispar (Haworth, 1802)
- Lycaena hippothoe (Linnaeus, 1761)
- Lycaena ottomanus (Lefebvre, 1830)
- Lycaena phlaeas (Linnaeus, 1761)
- Lycaena thersamon (Esper, 1784)
- Lycaena tityrus (Poda, 1761)
- Lycaena virgaureae (Linnaeus, 1758)
- Lysandra bellargus (Rottemburg, 1775)
- Lysandra coridon (Poda, 1761)
- Phengaris alcon (Denis & Schiffermuller, 1775)
- Phengaris arion (Linnaeus, 1758)
- Plebejus argus (Linnaeus, 1758)
- Plebejus argyrognomon (Bergstrasser, 1779)
- Plebejus idas (Linnaeus, 1761)
- Polyommatus admetus (Esper, 1783)
- Polyommatus damon (Denis & Schiffermuller, 1775)
- Polyommatus ripartii (Freyer, 1830)
- Polyommatus daphnis (Denis & Schiffermuller, 1775)
- Polyommatus amandus (Schneider, 1792)
- Polyommatus dorylas (Denis & Schiffermuller, 1775)
- Polyommatus eros (Ochsenheimer, 1808)
- Polyommatus escheri (Hübner, 1823)
- Polyommatus icarus (Rottemburg, 1775)
- Pseudophilotes vicrama (Moore, 1865)
- Satyrium acaciae (Fabricius, 1787)
- Satyrium ilicis (Esper, 1779)
- Satyrium pruni (Linnaeus, 1758)
- Satyrium spini (Denis & Schiffermuller, 1775)
- Satyrium w-album (Knoch, 1782)
- Scolitantides orion (Pallas, 1771)
- Tarucus balkanica (Freyer, 1844)
- Thecla betulae (Linnaeus, 1758)

=== Nymphalidae ===
- Aglais io (Linnaeus, 1758)
- Aglais urticae (Linnaeus, 1758)
- Apatura ilia (Denis & Schiffermuller, 1775)
- Apatura iris (Linnaeus, 1758)
- Apatura metis Freyer, 1829
- Aphantopus hyperantus (Linnaeus, 1758)
- Araschnia levana (Linnaeus, 1758)
- Argynnis paphia (Linnaeus, 1758)
- Argynnis pandora (Denis & Schiffermuller, 1775)
- Boloria graeca (Staudinger, 1870)
- Boloria pales (Denis & Schiffermuller, 1775)
- Boloria dia (Linnaeus, 1767)
- Boloria euphrosyne (Linnaeus, 1758)
- Boloria selene (Denis & Schiffermuller, 1775)
- Boloria titania (Esper, 1793)
- Brenthis daphne (Bergstrasser, 1780)
- Brenthis hecate (Denis & Schiffermuller, 1775)
- Brenthis ino (Rottemburg, 1775)
- Brintesia circe (Fabricius, 1775)
- Charaxes jasius (Linnaeus, 1767)
- Chazara briseis (Linnaeus, 1764)
- Coenonympha arcania (Linnaeus, 1761)
- Coenonympha glycerion (Borkhausen, 1788)
- Coenonympha orientalis Rebel, 1910
- Coenonympha pamphilus (Linnaeus, 1758)
- Coenonympha rhodopensis Elwes, 1900
- Coenonympha tullia (Muller, 1764)
- Erebia aethiops (Esper, 1777)
- Erebia cassioides (Reiner & Hochenwarth, 1792)
- Erebia epiphron (Knoch, 1783)
- Erebia euryale (Esper, 1805)
- Erebia gorge (Hübner, 1804)
- Erebia ligea (Linnaeus, 1758)
- Erebia manto (Denis & Schiffermuller, 1775)
- Erebia medusa (Denis & Schiffermuller, 1775)
- Erebia melas (Herbst, 1796)
- Erebia oeme (Hübner, 1804)
- Erebia ottomana Herrich-Schäffer, 1847
- Erebia pandrose (Borkhausen, 1788)
- Erebia pronoe (Esper, 1780)
- Erebia triarius (de Prunner, 1798)
- Euphydryas aurinia (Rottemburg, 1775)
- Euphydryas maturna (Linnaeus, 1758)
- Fabriciana adippe (Denis & Schiffermuller, 1775)
- Fabriciana niobe (Linnaeus, 1758)
- Hipparchia fagi (Scopoli, 1763)
- Hipparchia syriaca (Staudinger, 1871)
- Hipparchia fatua Freyer, 1844
- Hipparchia statilinus (Hufnagel, 1766)
- Hipparchia semele (Linnaeus, 1758)
- Hyponephele lupinus (O. Costa, 1836)
- Hyponephele lycaon (Rottemburg, 1775)
- Issoria lathonia (Linnaeus, 1758)
- Kirinia roxelana (Cramer, 1777)
- Lasiommata maera (Linnaeus, 1758)
- Lasiommata megera (Linnaeus, 1767)
- Lasiommata petropolitana (Fabricius, 1787)
- Libythea celtis (Laicharting, 1782)
- Limenitis camilla (Linnaeus, 1764)
- Limenitis populi (Linnaeus, 1758)
- Limenitis reducta Staudinger, 1901
- Lopinga achine (Scopoli, 1763)
- Maniola jurtina (Linnaeus, 1758)
- Melanargia galathea (Linnaeus, 1758)
- Melanargia larissa (Geyer, 1828)
- Melitaea athalia (Rottemburg, 1775)
- Melitaea aurelia Nickerl, 1850
- Melitaea cinxia (Linnaeus, 1758)
- Melitaea diamina (Lang, 1789)
- Melitaea didyma (Esper, 1778)
- Melitaea phoebe (Denis & Schiffermuller, 1775)
- Minois dryas (Scopoli, 1763)
- Neptis rivularis (Scopoli, 1763)
- Neptis sappho (Pallas, 1771)
- Nymphalis antiopa (Linnaeus, 1758)
- Nymphalis polychloros (Linnaeus, 1758)
- Nymphalis xanthomelas (Esper, 1781)
- Pararge aegeria (Linnaeus, 1758)
- Polygonia c-album (Linnaeus, 1758)
- Polygonia egea (Cramer, 1775)
- Pseudochazara anthelea (Hübner, 1824)
- Pyronia tithonus (Linnaeus, 1767)
- Satyrus ferula (Fabricius, 1793)
- Speyeria aglaja (Linnaeus, 1758)
- Vanessa atalanta (Linnaeus, 1758)
- Vanessa cardui (Linnaeus, 1758)

=== Papilionidae ===
- Iphiclides podalirius (Linnaeus, 1758)
- Papilio machaon Linnaeus, 1758
- Parnassius apollo (Linnaeus, 1758)
- Parnassius mnemosyne (Linnaeus, 1758)
- Zerynthia cerisy (Godart, 1824)
- Zerynthia polyxena (Denis & Schiffermuller, 1775)

=== Pieridae ===
- Anthocharis cardamines (Linnaeus, 1758)
- Aporia crataegi (Linnaeus, 1758)
- Colias alfacariensis Ribbe, 1905
- Colias caucasica Staudinger, 1871
- Colias croceus (Fourcroy, 1785)
- Colias hyale (Linnaeus, 1758)
- Colias myrmidone (Esper, 1781)
- Euchloe ausonia (Hübner, 1804)
- Gonepteryx rhamni (Linnaeus, 1758)
- Leptidea morsei (Fenton, 1882)
- Leptidea sinapis (Linnaeus, 1758)
- Pieris balcana Lorkovic, 1970
- Pieris brassicae (Linnaeus, 1758)
- Pieris ergane (Geyer, 1828)
- Pieris mannii (Mayer, 1851)
- Pieris napi (Linnaeus, 1758)
- Pieris rapae (Linnaeus, 1758)
- Pontia edusa (Fabricius, 1777)

=== Riodinidae ===
- Hamearis lucina (Linnaeus, 1758)

== Moths ==
=== Adelidae ===
- Adela croesella (Scopoli, 1763)
- Adela homalella Staudinger, 1859
- Adela reaumurella (Linnaeus, 1758)
- Cauchas fibulella (Denis & Schiffermuller, 1775)
- Cauchas rufifrontella (Treitschke, 1833)
- Cauchas rufimitrella (Scopoli, 1763)
- Nematopogon adansoniella (Villers, 1789)
- Nematopogon robertella (Clerck, 1759)
- Nematopogon schwarziellus Zeller, 1839
- Nematopogon swammerdamella (Linnaeus, 1758)
- Nemophora cupriacella (Hübner, 1819)
- Nemophora degeerella (Linnaeus, 1758)
- Nemophora istrianellus (Heydenreich, 1851)
- Nemophora metallica (Poda, 1761)
- Nemophora minimella (Denis & Schiffermuller, 1775)
- Nemophora pfeifferella (Hübner, 1813)
- Nemophora raddaella (Hübner, 1793)
- Nemophora violellus (Herrich-Schäffer in Stainton, 1851)

=== Alucitidae ===
- Alucita bidentata Scholz & Jackh, 1994
- Alucita cymatodactyla Zeller, 1852
- Alucita grammodactyla Zeller, 1841
- Alucita hexadactyla Linnaeus, 1758

=== Argyresthiidae ===
- Argyresthia albistria (Haworth, 1828)
- Argyresthia bonnetella (Linnaeus, 1758)
- Argyresthia prenjella Rebel, 1901
- Argyresthia pruniella (Clerck, 1759)
- Argyresthia pygmaeella (Denis & Schiffermuller, 1775)
- Argyresthia semitestacella (Curtis, 1833)
- Argyresthia sorbiella (Treitschke, 1833)
- Argyresthia spinosella Stainton, 1849

=== Autostichidae ===
- Aprominta designatella (Herrich-Schäffer, 1855)
- Nukusa praeditella (Rebel, 1891)

=== Bedelliidae ===
- Bedellia somnulentella (Zeller, 1847)

=== Blastobasidae ===
- Blastobasis phycidella (Zeller, 1839)
- Hypatopa segnella (Zeller, 1873)

=== Brahmaeidae ===
- Lemonia dumi (Linnaeus, 1761)
- Lemonia taraxaci (Denis & Schiffermuller, 1775)

=== Bucculatricidae ===
- Bucculatrix thoracella (Thunberg, 1794)

=== Chimabachidae ===
- Diurnea fagella (Denis & Schiffermuller, 1775)

=== Choreutidae ===
- Anthophila fabriciana (Linnaeus, 1767)
- Choreutis nemorana (Hübner, 1799)
- Choreutis pariana (Clerck, 1759)
- Prochoreutis myllerana (Fabricius, 1794)
- Tebenna bjerkandrella (Thunberg, 1784)
- Tebenna pretiosana (Duponchel, 1842)

=== Coleophoridae ===
- Coleophora kuehnella (Goeze, 1783)
- Coleophora mayrella (Hübner, 1813)
- Coleophora obviella Rebel, 1914
- Coleophora virgatella Zeller, 1849
- Coleophora wockeella Zeller, 1849

=== Cosmopterigidae ===
- Eteobalea isabellella (O. G. Costa, 1836)
- Eteobalea serratella (Treitschke, 1833)
- Pancalia leuwenhoekella (Linnaeus, 1761)
- Pancalia nodosella (Bruand, 1851)
- Pancalia schwarzella (Fabricius, 1798)

=== Cossidae ===
- Cossus cossus (Linnaeus, 1758)
- Dyspessa ulula (Borkhausen, 1790)
- Parahypopta caestrum (Hübner, 1808)
- Phragmataecia castaneae (Hübner, 1790)
- Zeuzera pyrina (Linnaeus, 1761)

=== Crambidae ===
- Achyra nudalis (Hübner, 1796)
- Agriphila dalmatinellus (Hampson, 1900)
- Agriphila deliella (Hübner, 1813)
- Agriphila geniculea (Haworth, 1811)
- Agriphila inquinatella (Denis & Schiffermuller, 1775)
- Agriphila latistria (Haworth, 1811)
- Agriphila paleatellus (Zeller, 1847)
- Agriphila straminella (Denis & Schiffermuller, 1775)
- Agriphila tristella (Denis & Schiffermuller, 1775)
- Agrotera nemoralis (Scopoli, 1763)
- Anania coronata (Hufnagel, 1767)
- Anania crocealis (Hübner, 1796)
- Anania funebris (Strom, 1768)
- Anania fuscalis (Denis & Schiffermuller, 1775)
- Anania hortulata (Linnaeus, 1758)
- Anania lancealis (Denis & Schiffermuller, 1775)
- Anania luctualis (Hübner, 1793)
- Anania stachydalis (Germar, 1821)
- Anania terrealis (Treitschke, 1829)
- Anania testacealis (Zeller, 1847)
- Anania verbascalis (Denis & Schiffermuller, 1775)
- Anarpia incertalis (Duponchel, 1832)
- Ancylolomia tentaculella (Hübner, 1796)
- Antigastra catalaunalis (Duponchel, 1833)
- Aporodes floralis (Hübner, 1809)
- Calamotropha paludella (Hübner, 1824)
- Cataclysta lemnata (Linnaeus, 1758)
- Catoptria acutangulellus (Herrich-Schäffer, 1847)
- Catoptria captiva Bassi, 1999
- Catoptria domaviellus (Rebel, 1904)
- Catoptria falsella (Denis & Schiffermuller, 1775)
- Catoptria languidellus (Zeller, 1863)
- Catoptria lythargyrella (Hübner, 1796)
- Catoptria myella (Hübner, 1796)
- Catoptria mytilella (Hübner, 1805)
- Catoptria pauperellus (Treitschke, 1832)
- Catoptria pinella (Linnaeus, 1758)
- Catoptria speculalis Hübner, 1825
- Catoptria verellus (Zincken, 1817)
- Cholius luteolaris (Scopoli, 1772)
- Chrysocrambus craterella (Scopoli, 1763)
- Chrysocrambus linetella (Fabricius, 1781)
- Chrysoteuchia culmella (Linnaeus, 1758)
- Cornifrons ulceratalis Lederer, 1858
- Crambus lathoniellus (Zincken, 1817)
- Crambus pascuella (Linnaeus, 1758)
- Crambus perlella (Scopoli, 1763)
- Crambus pratella (Linnaeus, 1758)
- Crambus uliginosellus Zeller, 1850
- Cynaeda dentalis (Denis & Schiffermuller, 1775)
- Cynaeda gigantea (Wocke, 1871)
- Diasemia reticularis (Linnaeus, 1761)
- Diasemiopsis ramburialis (Duponchel, 1834)
- Dolicharthria punctalis (Denis & Schiffermuller, 1775)
- Donacaula forficella (Thunberg, 1794)
- Donacaula mucronella (Denis & Schiffermuller, 1775)
- Ecpyrrhorrhoe diffusalis (Guenee, 1854)
- Ecpyrrhorrhoe rubiginalis (Hübner, 1796)
- Elophila nymphaeata (Linnaeus, 1758)
- Epascestria pustulalis (Hübner, 1823)
- Euchromius bella (Hübner, 1796)
- Euchromius ocellea (Haworth, 1811)
- Eudonia delunella (Stainton, 1849)
- Eudonia lacustrata (Panzer, 1804)
- Eudonia laetella (Zeller, 1846)
- Eudonia mercurella (Linnaeus, 1758)
- Eudonia murana (Curtis, 1827)
- Eudonia petrophila (Standfuss, 1848)
- Eudonia phaeoleuca (Zeller, 1846)
- Eudonia truncicolella (Stainton, 1849)
- Eurrhypis guttulalis (Herrich-Schäffer, 1848)
- Eurrhypis pollinalis (Denis & Schiffermuller, 1775)
- Evergestis aenealis (Denis & Schiffermuller, 1775)
- Evergestis alborivulalis (Eversmann, 1844)
- Evergestis caesialis (Herrich-Schäffer, 1849)
- Evergestis forficalis (Linnaeus, 1758)
- Evergestis pallidata (Hufnagel, 1767)
- Evergestis politalis (Denis & Schiffermuller, 1775)
- Evergestis sophialis (Fabricius, 1787)
- Friedlanderia cicatricella (Hübner, 1824)
- Heliothela wulfeniana (Scopoli, 1763)
- Hellula undalis (Fabricius, 1781)
- Hydriris ornatalis (Duponchel, 1832)
- Loxostege fascialis (Hübner, 1796)
- Loxostege manualis (Geyer, 1832)
- Loxostege sticticalis (Linnaeus, 1761)
- Mecyna flavalis (Denis & Schiffermuller, 1775)
- Mecyna trinalis (Denis & Schiffermuller, 1775)
- Metasia carnealis (Treitschke, 1829)
- Metasia ophialis (Treitschke, 1829)
- Metaxmeste phrygialis (Hübner, 1796)
- Nascia cilialis (Hübner, 1796)
- Nomophila noctuella (Denis & Schiffermuller, 1775)
- Nymphula nitidulata (Hufnagel, 1767)
- Ostrinia nubilalis (Hübner, 1796)
- Palpita vitrealis (Rossi, 1794)
- Paracorsia repandalis (Denis & Schiffermuller, 1775)
- Parapoynx nivalis (Denis & Schiffermuller, 1775)
- Parapoynx stratiotata (Linnaeus, 1758)
- Paratalanta hyalinalis (Hübner, 1796)
- Paratalanta pandalis (Hübner, 1825)
- Pediasia contaminella (Hübner, 1796)
- Pediasia luteella (Denis & Schiffermuller, 1775)
- Platytes cerussella (Denis & Schiffermuller, 1775)
- Pleuroptya balteata (Fabricius, 1798)
- Pleuroptya ruralis (Scopoli, 1763)
- Psammotis pulveralis (Hübner, 1796)
- Pyrausta aurata (Scopoli, 1763)
- Pyrausta castalis Treitschke, 1829
- Pyrausta cingulata (Linnaeus, 1758)
- Pyrausta coracinalis Leraut, 1982
- Pyrausta despicata (Scopoli, 1763)
- Pyrausta falcatalis Guenee, 1854
- Pyrausta nigrata (Scopoli, 1763)
- Pyrausta obfuscata (Scopoli, 1763)
- Pyrausta ostrinalis (Hübner, 1796)
- Pyrausta porphyralis (Denis & Schiffermuller, 1775)
- Pyrausta purpuralis (Linnaeus, 1758)
- Pyrausta sanguinalis (Linnaeus, 1767)
- Pyrausta virginalis Duponchel, 1832
- Scirpophaga praelata (Scopoli, 1763)
- Scoparia ambigualis (Treitschke, 1829)
- Scoparia ingratella (Zeller, 1846)
- Scoparia manifestella (Herrich-Schäffer, 1848)
- Scoparia pyralella (Denis & Schiffermuller, 1775)
- Scoparia subfusca Haworth, 1811
- Sitochroa palealis (Denis & Schiffermuller, 1775)
- Sitochroa verticalis (Linnaeus, 1758)
- Thisanotia chrysonuchella (Scopoli, 1763)
- Udea alpinalis (Denis & Schiffermuller, 1775)
- Udea cyanalis (La Harpe, 1855)
- Udea ferrugalis (Hübner, 1796)
- Udea fimbriatralis (Duponchel, 1834)
- Udea fulvalis (Hübner, 1809)
- Udea languidalis (Eversmann, 1842)
- Udea lutealis (Hübner, 1809)
- Udea nebulalis (Hübner, 1796)
- Udea olivalis (Denis & Schiffermuller, 1775)
- Udea prunalis (Denis & Schiffermuller, 1775)
- Uresiphita gilvata (Fabricius, 1794)
- Xanthocrambus lucellus (Herrich-Schäffer, 1848)
- Xanthocrambus saxonellus (Zincken, 1821)

=== Douglasiidae ===
- Klimeschia transversella (Zeller, 1839)

=== Drepanidae ===
- Asphalia ruficollis (Denis & Schiffermuller, 1775)
- Cymatophorina diluta (Denis & Schiffermuller, 1775)
- Drepana falcataria (Linnaeus, 1758)
- Habrosyne pyritoides (Hufnagel, 1766)
- Polyploca ridens (Fabricius, 1787)
- Tethea ocularis (Linnaeus, 1767)
- Tethea or (Denis & Schiffermuller, 1775)
- Thyatira batis (Linnaeus, 1758)
- Watsonalla binaria (Hufnagel, 1767)
- Watsonalla cultraria (Fabricius, 1775)
- Watsonalla uncinula (Borkhausen, 1790)

=== Elachistidae ===
- Agonopterix alpigena (Frey, 1870)
- Agonopterix alstromeriana (Clerck, 1759)
- Agonopterix arenella (Denis & Schiffermuller, 1775)
- Agonopterix astrantiae (Heinemann, 1870)
- Agonopterix atomella (Denis & Schiffermuller, 1775)
- Agonopterix doronicella (Wocke, 1849)
- Agonopterix heracliana (Linnaeus, 1758)
- Agonopterix pallorella (Zeller, 1839)
- Agonopterix purpurea (Haworth, 1811)
- Depressaria albipunctella (Denis & Schiffermuller, 1775)
- Depressaria chaerophylli Zeller, 1839
- Depressaria douglasella Stainton, 1849
- Depressaria pentheri Rebel, 1904
- Elachista occidentalis Frey, 1882
- Heinemannia festivella (Denis & Schiffermuller, 1775)
- Hypercallia citrinalis (Scopoli, 1763)
- Orophia denisella (Denis & Schiffermuller, 1775)
- Orophia ferrugella (Denis & Schiffermuller, 1775)
- Orophia sordidella (Hübner, 1796)
- Semioscopis steinkellneriana (Denis & Schiffermuller, 1775)
- Semioscopis strigulana (Denis & Schiffermuller, 1775)
- Telechrysis tripuncta (Haworth, 1828)

=== Endromidae ===
- Endromis versicolora (Linnaeus, 1758)

=== Epermeniidae ===
- Epermenia aequidentellus (E. Hofmann, 1867)
- Epermenia insecurella (Stainton, 1854)
- Epermenia pontificella (Hübner, 1796)
- Epermenia scurella (Stainton, 1851)
- Phaulernis statariella (Heyden, 1863)

=== Erebidae ===
- Amata kruegeri (Ragusa, 1904)
- Amata phegea (Linnaeus, 1758)
- Apopestes spectrum (Esper, 1787)
- Arctia caja (Linnaeus, 1758)
- Arctia festiva (Hufnagel, 1766)
- Arctia villica (Linnaeus, 1758)
- Arctornis l-nigrum (Muller, 1764)
- Atolmis rubricollis (Linnaeus, 1758)
- Autophila dilucida (Hübner, 1808)
- Autophila limbata (Staudinger, 1871)
- Autophila anaphanes Boursin, 1940
- Callimorpha dominula (Linnaeus, 1758)
- Calliteara pudibunda (Linnaeus, 1758)
- Calymma communimacula (Denis & Schiffermuller, 1775)
- Calyptra thalictri (Borkhausen, 1790)
- Catephia alchymista (Denis & Schiffermuller, 1775)
- Catocala coniuncta (Esper, 1787)
- Catocala conversa (Esper, 1783)
- Catocala dilecta (Hübner, 1808)
- Catocala disjuncta (Geyer, 1828)
- Catocala diversa (Geyer, 1828)
- Catocala electa (Vieweg, 1790)
- Catocala elocata (Esper, 1787)
- Catocala fraxini (Linnaeus, 1758)
- Catocala fulminea (Scopoli, 1763)
- Catocala hymenaea (Denis & Schiffermuller, 1775)
- Catocala lupina Herrich-Schäffer, 1851
- Catocala nupta (Linnaeus, 1767)
- Catocala nymphaea (Esper, 1787)
- Catocala nymphagoga (Esper, 1787)
- Catocala promissa (Denis & Schiffermuller, 1775)
- Catocala puerpera (Giorna, 1791)
- Catocala sponsa (Linnaeus, 1767)
- Clytie syriaca (Bugnion, 1837)
- Colobochyla salicalis (Denis & Schiffermuller, 1775)
- Coscinia cribraria (Linnaeus, 1758)
- Coscinia striata (Linnaeus, 1758)
- Cybosia mesomella (Linnaeus, 1758)
- Cymbalophora pudica (Esper, 1785)
- Diacrisia sannio (Linnaeus, 1758)
- Diaphora luctuosa (Hübner, 1831)
- Diaphora mendica (Clerck, 1759)
- Dicallomera fascelina (Linnaeus, 1758)
- Drasteria cailino (Lefebvre, 1827)
- Dysauxes ancilla (Linnaeus, 1767)
- Dysauxes punctata (Fabricius, 1781)
- Dysgonia algira (Linnaeus, 1767)
- Dysgonia torrida (Guenee, 1852)
- Eilema caniola (Hübner, 1808)
- Eilema complana (Linnaeus, 1758)
- Eilema depressa (Esper, 1787)
- Eilema griseola (Hübner, 1803)
- Eilema lurideola (Zincken, 1817)
- Eilema lutarella (Linnaeus, 1758)
- Eilema palliatella (Scopoli, 1763)
- Eilema pygmaeola (Doubleday, 1847)
- Eilema sororcula (Hufnagel, 1766)
- Eublemma amoena (Hübner, 1803)
- Eublemma candidana (Fabricius, 1794)
- Eublemma himmighoffeni (Milliere, 1867)
- Eublemma minutata (Fabricius, 1794)
- Eublemma ostrina (Hübner, 1808)
- Eublemma parva (Hübner, 1808)
- Eublemma polygramma (Duponchel, 1842)
- Eublemma purpurina (Denis & Schiffermuller, 1775)
- Eublemma scitula Rambur, 1833
- Eublemma viridula (Guenee, 1841)
- Euclidia mi (Clerck, 1759)
- Euclidia glyphica (Linnaeus, 1758)
- Euclidia triquetra (Denis & Schiffermuller, 1775)
- Euplagia quadripunctaria (Poda, 1761)
- Euproctis chrysorrhoea (Linnaeus, 1758)
- Euproctis similis (Fuessly, 1775)
- Exophyla rectangularis (Geyer, 1828)
- Grammodes bifasciata (Petagna, 1787)
- Grammodes stolida (Fabricius, 1775)
- Herminia grisealis (Denis & Schiffermuller, 1775)
- Herminia tarsicrinalis (Knoch, 1782)
- Herminia tarsipennalis (Treitschke, 1835)
- Herminia tenuialis (Rebel, 1899)
- Hypena crassalis (Fabricius, 1787)
- Hypena obesalis Treitschke, 1829
- Hypena obsitalis (Hübner, 1813)
- Hypena palpalis (Hübner, 1796)
- Hypena proboscidalis (Linnaeus, 1758)
- Hypena rostralis (Linnaeus, 1758)
- Hypenodes humidalis Doubleday, 1850
- Hyphantria cunea (Drury, 1773)
- Idia calvaria (Denis & Schiffermuller, 1775)
- Laelia coenosa (Hübner, 1808)
- Laspeyria flexula (Denis & Schiffermuller, 1775)
- Leucoma salicis (Linnaeus, 1758)
- Lithosia quadra (Linnaeus, 1758)
- Lygephila craccae (Denis & Schiffermuller, 1775)
- Lygephila lusoria (Linnaeus, 1758)
- Lygephila pastinum (Treitschke, 1826)
- Lygephila procax (Hübner, 1813)
- Lygephila viciae (Hübner, 1822)
- Lymantria dispar (Linnaeus, 1758)
- Lymantria monacha (Linnaeus, 1758)
- Metachrostis dardouini (Boisduval, 1840)
- Metachrostis velox (Hübner, 1813)
- Miltochrista miniata (Forster, 1771)
- Minucia lunaris (Denis & Schiffermuller, 1775)
- Nodaria nodosalis (Herrich-Schäffer, 1851)
- Nudaria mundana (Linnaeus, 1761)
- Ocneria ledereri (Milliere, 1869)
- Ocneria rubea (Denis & Schiffermuller, 1775)
- Odice arcuinna (Hübner, 1790)
- Odice suava (Hübner, 1813)
- Ophiusa tirhaca (Cramer, 1773)
- Orectis proboscidata (Herrich-Schäffer, 1851)
- Orgyia recens (Hübner, 1819)
- Orgyia antiqua (Linnaeus, 1758)
- Paracolax tristalis (Fabricius, 1794)
- Parascotia fuliginaria (Linnaeus, 1761)
- Parasemia plantaginis (Linnaeus, 1758)
- Parocneria detrita (Esper, 1785)
- Parocneria terebinthi (Freyer, 1838)
- Pechipogo plumigeralis Hübner, 1825
- Pechipogo strigilata (Linnaeus, 1758)
- Penthophera morio (Linnaeus, 1767)
- Phragmatobia fuliginosa (Linnaeus, 1758)
- Phragmatobia luctifera (Denis & Schiffermuller, 1775)
- Phragmatobia placida (Frivaldszky, 1835)
- Phytometra viridaria (Clerck, 1759)
- Polypogon gryphalis (Herrich-Schäffer, 1851)
- Polypogon tentacularia (Linnaeus, 1758)
- Rhypagla lacernaria (Hübner, 1813)
- Rhyparia purpurata (Linnaeus, 1758)
- Rivula sericealis (Scopoli, 1763)
- Schrankia costaestrigalis (Stephens, 1834)
- Schrankia taenialis (Hübner, 1809)
- Scoliopteryx libatrix (Linnaeus, 1758)
- Setina irrorella (Linnaeus, 1758)
- Setina roscida (Denis & Schiffermuller, 1775)
- Simplicia rectalis (Eversmann, 1842)
- Spilosoma lubricipeda (Linnaeus, 1758)
- Spilosoma lutea (Hufnagel, 1766)
- Spilosoma urticae (Esper, 1789)
- Tathorhynchus exsiccata (Lederer, 1855)
- Trisateles emortualis (Denis & Schiffermuller, 1775)
- Tyria jacobaeae (Linnaeus, 1758)
- Utetheisa pulchella (Linnaeus, 1758)
- Watsonarctia deserta (Bartel, 1902)
- Zanclognatha zelleralis (Wocke, 1850)
- Zebeeba falsalis (Herrich-Schäffer, 1839)
- Zekelita antiqualis (Hübner, 1809)
- Zethes insularis Rambur, 1833

=== Euteliidae ===
- Eutelia adoratrix (Staudinger, 1892)
- Eutelia adulatrix (Hübner, 1813)

=== Gelechiidae ===
- Acompsia cinerella (Clerck, 1759)
- Acompsia ponomarenkoae Huemer & Karsholt, 2002
- Anacampsis obscurella (Denis & Schiffermuller, 1775)
- Anacampsis scintillella (Fischer von Röslerstamm, 1841)
- Apodia bifractella (Duponchel, 1843)
- Aproaerema anthyllidella (Hübner, 1813)
- Aristotelia baltica A. Sulcs & I. Sulcs, 1983
- Aristotelia decurtella (Hübner, 1813)
- Brachmia dimidiella (Denis & Schiffermuller, 1775)
- Bryotropha desertella (Douglas, 1850)
- Bryotropha plebejella (Zeller, 1847)
- Bryotropha similis (Stainton, 1854)
- Bryotropha terrella (Denis & Schiffermuller, 1775)
- Carpatolechia fugitivella (Zeller, 1839)
- Caryocolum fischerella (Treitschke, 1833)
- Caryocolum junctella (Douglas, 1851)
- Caryocolum leucomelanella (Zeller, 1839)
- Caryocolum peregrinella (Herrich-Schäffer, 1854)
- Chionodes distinctella (Zeller, 1839)
- Chionodes nebulosella (Heinemann, 1870)
- Chrysoesthia sexguttella (Thunberg, 1794)
- Crossobela trinotella (Herrich-Schäffer, 1856)
- Dichomeris derasella (Denis & Schiffermuller, 1775)
- Dichomeris limosellus (Schlager, 1849)
- Ephysteris inustella (Zeller, 1847)
- Eulamprotes libertinella (Zeller, 1872)
- Eulamprotes superbella (Zeller, 1839)
- Eulamprotes wilkella (Linnaeus, 1758)
- Exoteleia dodecella (Linnaeus, 1758)
- Exoteleia succinctella (Zeller, 1872)
- Gelechia scotinella Herrich-Schäffer, 1854
- Gelechia senticetella (Staudinger, 1859)
- Gelechia sororculella (Hübner, 1817)
- Helcystogramma triannulella (Herrich-Schäffer, 1854)
- Isophrictis striatella (Denis & Schiffermuller, 1775)
- Megacraspedus binotella (Duponchel, 1843)
- Megacraspedus dolosellus (Zeller, 1839)
- Mesophleps silacella (Hübner, 1796)
- Metzneria paucipunctella (Zeller, 1839)
- Mirificarma eburnella (Denis & Schiffermuller, 1775)
- Monochroa lucidella (Stephens, 1834)
- Neofaculta ericetella (Geyer, 1832)
- Nothris verbascella (Denis & Schiffermuller, 1775)
- Pseudotelphusa istrella (Mann, 1866)
- Pseudotelphusa paripunctella (Thunberg, 1794)
- Recurvaria leucatella (Clerck, 1759)
- Scrobipalpa chrysanthemella (E. Hofmann, 1867)
- Scrobipalpa ocellatella (Boyd, 1858)
- Sophronia humerella (Denis & Schiffermuller, 1775)
- Sophronia illustrella (Hübner, 1796)
- Sophronia semicostella (Hübner, 1813)
- Sophronia sicariellus (Zeller, 1839)
- Syncopacma cinctella (Clerck, 1759)
- Syncopacma coronillella (Treitschke, 1833)
- Syncopacma taeniolella (Zeller, 1839)
- Teleiopsis rosalbella (Fologne, 1862)
- Thiotricha majorella (Rebel, 1910)

=== Geometridae ===
- Abraxas grossulariata (Linnaeus, 1758)
- Alsophila aceraria (Denis & Schiffermuller, 1775)
- Alsophila aescularia (Denis & Schiffermuller, 1775)
- Anticlea derivata (Denis & Schiffermuller, 1775)
- Anticollix sparsata (Treitschke, 1828)
- Aplasta ononaria (Fuessly, 1783)
- Aplocera plagiata (Linnaeus, 1758)
- Aplocera praeformata (Hübner, 1826)
- Aplocera simpliciata (Treitschke, 1835)
- Ascotis selenaria (Denis & Schiffermuller, 1775)
- Asthena albulata (Hufnagel, 1767)
- Baptria tibiale (Esper, 1791)
- Biston betularia (Linnaeus, 1758)
- Biston strataria (Hufnagel, 1767)
- Campaea margaritaria (Linnaeus, 1761)
- Camptogramma bilineata (Linnaeus, 1758)
- Camptogramma scripturata (Hübner, 1799)
- Carsia lythoxylata (Hübner, 1799)
- Cataclysme riguata (Hübner, 1813)
- Catarhoe putridaria (Herrich-Schäffer, 1852)
- Catarhoe rubidata (Denis & Schiffermuller, 1775)
- Charissa obscurata (Denis & Schiffermuller, 1775)
- Charissa variegata (Duponchel, 1830)
- Chlorissa cloraria (Hübner, 1813)
- Chloroclysta siterata (Hufnagel, 1767)
- Chloroclystis v-ata (Haworth, 1809)
- Cidaria fulvata (Forster, 1771)
- Cleta filacearia (Herrich-Schäffer, 1847)
- Coenotephria tophaceata (Denis & Schiffermuller, 1775)
- Colostygia aptata (Hübner, 1813)
- Colostygia aqueata (Hübner, 1813)
- Colostygia fitzi (Schawerda, 1914)
- Colostygia kollariaria (Herrich-Schäffer, 1848)
- Colostygia olivata (Denis & Schiffermuller, 1775)
- Colostygia pectinataria (Knoch, 1781)
- Colostygia turbata (Hübner, 1799)
- Colotois pennaria (Linnaeus, 1761)
- Comibaena bajularia (Denis & Schiffermuller, 1775)
- Cosmorhoe ocellata (Linnaeus, 1758)
- Costaconvexa polygrammata (Borkhausen, 1794)
- Cyclophora linearia (Hübner, 1799)
- Cyclophora porata (Linnaeus, 1767)
- Cyclophora punctaria (Linnaeus, 1758)
- Cyclophora puppillaria (Hübner, 1799)
- Dysstroma citrata (Linnaeus, 1761)
- Dysstroma truncata (Hufnagel, 1767)
- Earophila badiata (Denis & Schiffermuller, 1775)
- Ecliptopera silaceata (Denis & Schiffermuller, 1775)
- Electrophaes corylata (Thunberg, 1792)
- Entephria caesiata (Denis & Schiffermuller, 1775)
- Entephria cyanata (Hübner, 1809)
- Entephria flavicinctata (Hübner, 1813)
- Entephria nobiliaria (Herrich-Schäffer, 1852)
- Epirrhoe alternata (Muller, 1764)
- Epirrhoe galiata (Denis & Schiffermuller, 1775)
- Epirrhoe hastulata (Hübner, 1790)
- Epirrhoe molluginata (Hübner, 1813)
- Epirrhoe rivata (Hübner, 1813)
- Epirrhoe tristata (Linnaeus, 1758)
- Epirrita christyi (Allen, 1906)
- Epirrita dilutata (Denis & Schiffermuller, 1775)
- Euchoeca nebulata (Scopoli, 1763)
- Eucrostes indigenata (de Villers, 1789)
- Eulithis populata (Linnaeus, 1758)
- Eulithis prunata (Linnaeus, 1758)
- Euphyia adumbraria (Herrich-Schäffer, 1852)
- Euphyia biangulata (Haworth, 1809)
- Euphyia frustata (Treitschke, 1828)
- Euphyia mesembrina (Rebel, 1927)
- Euphyia unangulata (Haworth, 1809)
- Eupithecia abietaria (Goeze, 1781)
- Eupithecia actaeata Walderdorff, 1869
- Eupithecia alliaria Staudinger, 1870
- Eupithecia analoga Djakonov, 1926
- Eupithecia assimilata Doubleday, 1856
- Eupithecia breviculata (Donzel, 1837)
- Eupithecia cauchiata (Duponchel, 1831)
- Eupithecia centaureata (Denis & Schiffermuller, 1775)
- Eupithecia cretaceata (Packard, 1874)
- Eupithecia cuculliaria (Rebel, 1901)
- Eupithecia denotata (Hübner, 1813)
- Eupithecia distinctaria Herrich-Schäffer, 1848
- Eupithecia gemellata Herrich-Schäffer, 1861
- Eupithecia graphata (Treitschke, 1828)
- Eupithecia haworthiata Doubleday, 1856
- Eupithecia icterata (de Villers, 1789)
- Eupithecia impurata (Hübner, 1813)
- Eupithecia irriguata (Hübner, 1813)
- Eupithecia laquaearia Herrich-Schäffer, 1848
- Eupithecia linariata (Denis & Schiffermuller, 1775)
- Eupithecia oxycedrata (Rambur, 1833)
- Eupithecia phoeniceata (Rambur, 1834)
- Eupithecia plumbeolata (Haworth, 1809)
- Eupithecia pusillata (Denis & Schiffermuller, 1775)
- Eupithecia riparia Herrich-Schäffer, 1851
- Eupithecia satyrata (Hübner, 1813)
- Eupithecia semigraphata Bruand, 1850
- Eupithecia spissilineata (Metzner, 1846)
- Eupithecia subfuscata (Haworth, 1809)
- Eupithecia subumbrata (Denis & Schiffermuller, 1775)
- Eupithecia succenturiata (Linnaeus, 1758)
- Eupithecia tantillaria Boisduval, 1840
- Eupithecia tripunctaria Herrich-Schäffer, 1852
- Eupithecia undata (Freyer, 1840)
- Eupithecia variostrigata Alpheraky, 1876
- Eupithecia venosata (Fabricius, 1787)
- Eupithecia veratraria Herrich-Schäffer, 1848
- Eupithecia vulgata (Haworth, 1809)
- Eustroma reticulata (Denis & Schiffermuller, 1775)
- Gandaritis pyraliata (Denis & Schiffermuller, 1775)
- Geometra papilionaria (Linnaeus, 1758)
- Gymnoscelis rufifasciata (Haworth, 1809)
- Hemistola chrysoprasaria (Esper, 1795)
- Hemithea aestivaria (Hübner, 1789)
- Horisme aemulata (Hübner, 1813)
- Horisme calligraphata (Herrich-Schäffer, 1838)
- Horisme corticata (Treitschke, 1835)
- Horisme tersata (Denis & Schiffermuller, 1775)
- Horisme vitalbata (Denis & Schiffermuller, 1775)
- Hydrelia flammeolaria (Hufnagel, 1767)
- Hydriomena furcata (Thunberg, 1784)
- Hypomecis punctinalis (Scopoli, 1763)
- Idaea aversata (Linnaeus, 1758)
- Idaea circuitaria (Hübner, 1819)
- Idaea consanguinaria (Lederer, 1853)
- Idaea dilutaria (Hübner, 1799)
- Idaea dimidiata (Hufnagel, 1767)
- Idaea elongaria (Rambur, 1833)
- Idaea ochrata (Scopoli, 1763)
- Idaea rufaria (Hübner, 1799)
- Idaea rusticata (Denis & Schiffermuller, 1775)
- Idaea seriata (Schrank, 1802)
- Jodis lactearia (Linnaeus, 1758)
- Lampropteryx suffumata (Denis & Schiffermuller, 1775)
- Larentia clavaria (Haworth, 1809)
- Ligdia adustata (Denis & Schiffermuller, 1775)
- Lignyoptera thaumastaria Rebel, 1901
- Lobophora halterata (Hufnagel, 1767)
- Lythria cruentaria (Hufnagel, 1767)
- Lythria purpuraria (Linnaeus, 1758)
- Melanthia procellata (Denis & Schiffermuller, 1775)
- Mesoleuca albicillata (Linnaeus, 1758)
- Mesotype didymata (Linnaeus, 1758)
- Mesotype parallelolineata (Retzius, 1783)
- Mesotype verberata (Scopoli, 1763)
- Microloxia herbaria (Hübner, 1813)
- Minoa murinata (Scopoli, 1763)
- Nebula achromaria (de La Harpe, 1853)
- Nebula nebulata (Treitschke, 1828)
- Nebula senectaria (Herrich-Schäffer, 1852)
- Nothocasis sertata (Hübner, 1817)
- Nycterosea obstipata (Fabricius, 1794)
- Odezia atrata (Linnaeus, 1758)
- Operophtera brumata (Linnaeus, 1758)
- Opisthograptis luteolata (Linnaeus, 1758)
- Orthostixis cribraria (Hübner, 1799)
- Pasiphila debiliata (Hübner, 1817)
- Pasiphila rectangulata (Linnaeus, 1758)
- Pelurga comitata (Linnaeus, 1758)
- Peribatodes rhomboidaria (Denis & Schiffermuller, 1775)
- Perizoma affinitata (Stephens, 1831)
- Perizoma albulata (Denis & Schiffermuller, 1775)
- Perizoma alchemillata (Linnaeus, 1758)
- Perizoma blandiata (Denis & Schiffermuller, 1775)
- Perizoma flavofasciata (Thunberg, 1792)
- Perizoma hydrata (Treitschke, 1829)
- Perizoma incultaria (Herrich-Schäffer, 1848)
- Perizoma lugdunaria (Herrich-Schäffer, 1855)
- Perizoma minorata (Treitschke, 1828)
- Phaiogramma etruscaria (Zeller, 1849)
- Philereme transversata (Hufnagel, 1767)
- Plemyria rubiginata (Denis & Schiffermuller, 1775)
- Pseudobaptria bogumilaria (Rebel, 1904)
- Pseudopanthera macularia (Linnaeus, 1758)
- Pseudoterpna pruinata (Hufnagel, 1767)
- Rhodometra sacraria (Linnaeus, 1767)
- Rhodostrophia vibicaria (Clerck, 1759)
- Schistostege decussata (Denis & Schiffermuller, 1775)
- Scopula confinaria (Herrich-Schäffer, 1847)
- Scopula flaccidaria (Zeller, 1852)
- Scopula imitaria (Hübner, 1799)
- Scopula marginepunctata (Goeze, 1781)
- Scopula caricaria (Reutti, 1853)
- Scopula immorata (Linnaeus, 1758)
- Scopula nigropunctata (Hufnagel, 1767)
- Scotopteryx bipunctaria (Denis & Schiffermuller, 1775)
- Scotopteryx chenopodiata (Linnaeus, 1758)
- Scotopteryx coarctaria (Denis & Schiffermuller, 1775)
- Scotopteryx ignorata Huemer & Hausmann, 1998
- Scotopteryx moeniata (Scopoli, 1763)
- Scotopteryx mucronata (Scopoli, 1763)
- Scotopteryx vicinaria (Duponchel, 1830)
- Siona lineata (Scopoli, 1763)
- Synopsia sociaria (Hübner, 1799)
- Thalera fimbrialis (Scopoli, 1763)
- Thera variata (Denis & Schiffermuller, 1775)
- Thera vetustata (Denis & Schiffermuller, 1775)
- Thetidia smaragdaria (Fabricius, 1787)
- Trichopteryx carpinata (Borkhausen, 1794)
- Triphosa dubitata (Linnaeus, 1758)
- Triphosa sabaudiata (Duponchel, 1830)
- Xanthorhoe biriviata (Borkhausen, 1794)
- Xanthorhoe designata (Hufnagel, 1767)
- Xanthorhoe ferrugata (Clerck, 1759)
- Xanthorhoe fluctuata (Linnaeus, 1758)
- Xanthorhoe incursata (Hübner, 1813)
- Xanthorhoe montanata (Denis & Schiffermuller, 1775)
- Xanthorhoe quadrifasiata (Clerck, 1759)
- Xanthorhoe spadicearia (Denis & Schiffermuller, 1775)
- Xenochlorodes olympiaria (Herrich-Schäffer, 1852)

=== Glyphipterigidae ===
- Digitivalva reticulella (Hübner, 1796)

=== Gracillariidae ===
- Aspilapteryx limosella (Duponchel, 1843)
- Caloptilia elongella (Linnaeus, 1761)
- Caloptilia stigmatella (Fabricius, 1781)
- Cameraria ohridella Deschka & Dimic, 1986
- Euspilapteryx auroguttella Stephens, 1835
- Parornix anglicella (Stainton, 1850)
- Phyllocnistis unipunctella (Stephens, 1834)
- Phyllonorycter leucographella (Zeller, 1850)
- Phyllonorycter maestingella (Muller, 1764)
- Phyllonorycter pyrifoliella (Gerasimov, 1933)

=== Hepialidae ===
- Hepialus humuli (Linnaeus, 1758)
- Pharmacis carna (Denis & Schiffermuller, 1775)
- Pharmacis fusconebulosa (DeGeer, 1778)
- Pharmacis lupulina (Linnaeus, 1758)
- Phymatopus hecta (Linnaeus, 1758)
- Triodia sylvina (Linnaeus, 1761)

=== Heterogynidae ===
- Heterogynis penella (Hübner, 1819)

=== Incurvariidae ===
- Alloclemensia mesospilella (Herrich-Schäffer, 1854)
- Incurvaria masculella (Denis & Schiffermuller, 1775)
- Incurvaria triglavensis Hauder, 1912

=== Lasiocampidae ===
- Cosmotriche lobulina (Denis & Schiffermuller, 1775)
- Dendrolimus pini (Linnaeus, 1758)
- Eriogaster catax (Linnaeus, 1758)
- Eriogaster lanestris (Linnaeus, 1758)
- Gastropacha quercifolia (Linnaeus, 1758)
- Lasiocampa quercus (Linnaeus, 1758)
- Lasiocampa trifolii (Denis & Schiffermuller, 1775)
- Macrothylacia rubi (Linnaeus, 1758)
- Malacosoma castrensis (Linnaeus, 1758)
- Malacosoma neustria (Linnaeus, 1758)
- Odonestis pruni (Linnaeus, 1758)
- Phyllodesma tremulifolia (Hübner, 1810)
- Poecilocampa alpina (Frey & Wullschlegel, 1874)
- Poecilocampa populi (Linnaeus, 1758)
- Trichiura crataegi (Linnaeus, 1758)

=== Lecithoceridae ===
- Lecithocera nigrana (Duponchel, 1836)

=== Limacodidae ===
- Apoda limacodes (Hufnagel, 1766)
- Heterogenea asella (Denis & Schiffermuller, 1775)

=== Lyonetiidae ===
- Leucoptera laburnella (Stainton, 1851)

=== Lypusidae ===
- Pseudatemelia aeneella Rebel, 1910
- Pseudatemelia flavifrontella (Denis & Schiffermuller, 1775)

=== Micropterigidae ===
- Micropterix aruncella (Scopoli, 1763)
- Micropterix calthella (Linnaeus, 1761)
- Micropterix kardamylensis Rebel, 1903
- Micropterix tunbergella (Fabricius, 1787)

=== Momphidae ===
- Mompha miscella (Denis & Schiffermuller, 1775)
- Mompha conturbatella (Hübner, 1819)
- Mompha locupletella (Denis & Schiffermuller, 1775)

=== Nepticulidae ===
- Ectoedemia arcuatella (Herrich-Schäffer, 1855)
- Ectoedemia atricollis (Stainton, 1857)
- Ectoedemia gilvipennella (Klimesch, 1946)
- Ectoedemia heringi (Toll, 1934)
- Ectoedemia liechtensteini (Zimmermann, 1944)
- Ectoedemia rubivora (Wocke, 1860)
- Ectoedemia subbimaculella (Haworth, 1828)
- Ectoedemia turbidella (Zeller, 1848)
- Simplimorpha promissa (Staudinger, 1871)
- Stigmella desperatella (Frey, 1856)
- Stigmella hybnerella (Hübner, 1796)
- Stigmella incognitella (Herrich-Schäffer, 1855)
- Stigmella malella (Stainton, 1854)
- Stigmella oxyacanthella (Stainton, 1854)
- Stigmella paliurella Gerasimov, 1937
- Stigmella perpygmaeella (Doubleday, 1859)
- Stigmella regiella (Herrich-Schäffer, 1855)
- Stigmella ruficapitella (Haworth, 1828)
- Stigmella suberivora (Stainton, 1869)

=== Noctuidae ===
- Abrostola agnorista Dufay, 1956
- Abrostola asclepiadis (Denis & Schiffermuller, 1775)
- Abrostola tripartita (Hufnagel, 1766)
- Abrostola triplasia (Linnaeus, 1758)
- Acontia lucida (Hufnagel, 1766)
- Acontia trabealis (Scopoli, 1763)
- Acontia melanura (Tauscher, 1809)
- Acontiola moldavicola (Herrich-Schäffer, 1851)
- Acosmetia caliginosa (Hübner, 1813)
- Acronicta aceris (Linnaeus, 1758)
- Acronicta leporina (Linnaeus, 1758)
- Acronicta strigosa (Denis & Schiffermuller, 1775)
- Acronicta alni (Linnaeus, 1767)
- Acronicta cuspis (Hübner, 1813)
- Acronicta psi (Linnaeus, 1758)
- Acronicta tridens (Denis & Schiffermuller, 1775)
- Acronicta auricoma (Denis & Schiffermuller, 1775)
- Acronicta euphorbiae (Denis & Schiffermuller, 1775)
- Acronicta orientalis (Mann, 1862)
- Acronicta rumicis (Linnaeus, 1758)
- Actebia fugax (Treitschke, 1825)
- Actinotia polyodon (Clerck, 1759)
- Actinotia radiosa (Esper, 1804)
- Aedia funesta (Esper, 1786)
- Aedia leucomelas (Linnaeus, 1758)
- Aegle kaekeritziana (Hübner, 1799)
- Aegle semicana (Esper, 1798)
- Agrochola lychnidis (Denis & Schiffermuller, 1775)
- Agrochola lactiflora Draudt, 1934
- Agrochola helvola (Linnaeus, 1758)
- Agrochola humilis (Denis & Schiffermuller, 1775)
- Agrochola kindermannii (Fischer v. Röslerstamm, 1837)
- Agrochola litura (Linnaeus, 1758)
- Agrochola nitida (Denis & Schiffermuller, 1775)
- Agrochola thurneri Boursin, 1953
- Agrochola lota (Clerck, 1759)
- Agrochola macilenta (Hübner, 1809)
- Agrochola laevis (Hübner, 1803)
- Agrotis bigramma (Esper, 1790)
- Agrotis cinerea (Denis & Schiffermuller, 1775)
- Agrotis clavis (Hufnagel, 1766)
- Agrotis exclamationis (Linnaeus, 1758)
- Agrotis ipsilon (Hufnagel, 1766)
- Agrotis obesa Boisduval, 1829
- Agrotis puta (Hübner, 1803)
- Agrotis segetum (Denis & Schiffermuller, 1775)
- Agrotis spinifera (Hübner, 1808)
- Agrotis trux (Hübner, 1824)
- Allophyes oxyacanthae (Linnaeus, 1758)
- Amephana dalmatica (Rebel, 1919)
- Ammoconia caecimacula (Denis & Schiffermuller, 1775)
- Ammoconia senex (Geyer, 1828)
- Amphipoea fucosa (Freyer, 1830)
- Amphipoea oculea (Linnaeus, 1761)
- Amphipyra berbera Rungs, 1949
- Amphipyra effusa Boisduval, 1828
- Amphipyra livida (Denis & Schiffermuller, 1775)
- Amphipyra micans Lederer, 1857
- Amphipyra perflua (Fabricius, 1787)
- Amphipyra pyramidea (Linnaeus, 1758)
- Amphipyra stix Herrich-Schäffer, 1850
- Amphipyra tetra (Fabricius, 1787)
- Amphipyra tragopoginis (Clerck, 1759)
- Amphipyra cinnamomea (Goeze, 1781)
- Anaplectoides prasina (Denis & Schiffermuller, 1775)
- Anarta myrtilli (Linnaeus, 1761)
- Anarta melanopa (Thunberg, 1791)
- Anarta trifolii (Hufnagel, 1766)
- Anorthoa munda (Denis & Schiffermuller, 1775)
- Anthracia eriopoda (Herrich-Schäffer, 1851)
- Antitype chi (Linnaeus, 1758)
- Antitype jonis (Lederer, 1865)
- Antitype suda (Geyer, 1832)
- Apamea anceps (Denis & Schiffermuller, 1775)
- Apamea aquila Donzel, 1837
- Apamea crenata (Hufnagel, 1766)
- Apamea epomidion (Haworth, 1809)
- Apamea furva (Denis & Schiffermuller, 1775)
- Apamea illyria Freyer, 1846
- Apamea lateritia (Hufnagel, 1766)
- Apamea lithoxylaea (Denis & Schiffermuller, 1775)
- Apamea maillardi (Geyer, 1834)
- Apamea monoglypha (Hufnagel, 1766)
- Apamea oblonga (Haworth, 1809)
- Apamea platinea (Treitschke, 1825)
- Apamea remissa (Hübner, 1809)
- Apamea rubrirena (Treitschke, 1825)
- Apamea scolopacina (Esper, 1788)
- Apamea sordens (Hufnagel, 1766)
- Apamea sublustris (Esper, 1788)
- Apamea syriaca (Osthelder, 1933)
- Apamea unanimis (Hübner, 1813)
- Apamea zeta (Treitschke, 1825)
- Apaustis rupicola (Denis & Schiffermuller, 1775)
- Aporophyla australis (Boisduval, 1829)
- Aporophyla canescens (Duponchel, 1826)
- Aporophyla lutulenta (Denis & Schiffermuller, 1775)
- Aporophyla nigra (Haworth, 1809)
- Apterogenum ypsillon (Denis & Schiffermuller, 1775)
- Archanara neurica (Hübner, 1808)
- Asteroscopus sphinx (Hufnagel, 1766)
- Asteroscopus syriaca (Warren, 1910)
- Atethmia ambusta (Denis & Schiffermuller, 1775)
- Atethmia centrago (Haworth, 1809)
- Athetis furvula (Hübner, 1808)
- Athetis gluteosa (Treitschke, 1835)
- Athetis pallustris (Hübner, 1808)
- Athetis lepigone (Moschler, 1860)
- Atypha pulmonaris (Esper, 1790)
- Auchmis detersa (Esper, 1787)
- Autographa gamma (Linnaeus, 1758)
- Autographa jota (Linnaeus, 1758)
- Autographa pulchrina (Haworth, 1809)
- Axylia putris (Linnaeus, 1761)
- Behounekia freyeri (Frivaldszky, 1835)
- Brachionycha nubeculosa (Esper, 1785)
- Brachylomia viminalis (Fabricius, 1776)
- Bryophila ereptricula Treitschke, 1825
- Bryophila orthogramma (Boursin, 1954)
- Bryophila raptricula (Denis & Schiffermuller, 1775)
- Bryophila ravula (Hübner, 1813)
- Bryophila rectilinea (Warren, 1909)
- Bryophila seladona Christoph, 1885
- Bryophila tephrocharis (Boursin, 1953)
- Bryophila domestica (Hufnagel, 1766)
- Calamia tridens (Hufnagel, 1766)
- Calliergis ramosa (Esper, 1786)
- Callopistria juventina (Stoll, 1782)
- Callopistria latreillei (Duponchel, 1827)
- Calophasia lunula (Hufnagel, 1766)
- Calophasia opalina (Esper, 1793)
- Calophasia platyptera (Esper, 1788)
- Caradrina morpheus (Hufnagel, 1766)
- Caradrina gilva (Donzel, 1837)
- Caradrina clavipalpis Scopoli, 1763
- Caradrina flavirena Guenee, 1852
- Caradrina selini Boisduval, 1840
- Caradrina suscianja (Mentzer, 1981)
- Caradrina wullschlegeli Pungeler, 1903
- Caradrina aspersa Rambur, 1834
- Caradrina kadenii Freyer, 1836
- Caradrina terrea Freyer, 1840
- Ceramica pisi (Linnaeus, 1758)
- Cerapteryx graminis (Linnaeus, 1758)
- Cerastis rubricosa (Denis & Schiffermuller, 1775)
- Charanyca trigrammica (Hufnagel, 1766)
- Charanyca apfelbecki (Rebel, 1901)
- Charanyca ferruginea (Esper, 1785)
- Chersotis cuprea (Denis & Schiffermuller, 1775)
- Chersotis laeta (Rebel, 1904)
- Chersotis margaritacea (Villers, 1789)
- Chersotis multangula (Hübner, 1803)
- Chersotis rectangula (Denis & Schiffermuller, 1775)
- Chilodes maritima (Tauscher, 1806)
- Chloantha hyperici (Denis & Schiffermuller, 1775)
- Chrysodeixis chalcites (Esper, 1789)
- Cleoceris scoriacea (Esper, 1789)
- Cleonymia opposita (Lederer, 1870)
- Colocasia coryli (Linnaeus, 1758)
- Condica viscosa (Freyer, 1831)
- Conisania leineri (Freyer, 1836)
- Conisania luteago (Denis & Schiffermuller, 1775)
- Conistra ligula (Esper, 1791)
- Conistra rubiginosa (Scopoli, 1763)
- Conistra vaccinii (Linnaeus, 1761)
- Conistra veronicae (Hübner, 1813)
- Conistra erythrocephala (Denis & Schiffermuller, 1775)
- Conistra rubiginea (Denis & Schiffermuller, 1775)
- Conistra ragusae (Failla-Tedaldi, 1890)
- Conistra torrida (Lederer, 1857)
- Coranarta cordigera (Thunberg, 1788)
- Cosmia trapezina (Linnaeus, 1758)
- Cosmia pyralina (Denis & Schiffermuller, 1775)
- Cosmia confinis Herrich-Schäffer, 1849
- Cosmia affinis (Linnaeus, 1767)
- Craniophora ligustri (Denis & Schiffermuller, 1775)
- Craniophora pontica (Staudinger, 1878)
- Cryphia fraudatricula (Hübner, 1803)
- Cryphia receptricula (Hübner, 1803)
- Cryphia algae (Fabricius, 1775)
- Cryphia ochsi (Boursin, 1940)
- Crypsedra gemmea (Treitschke, 1825)
- Cucullia celsiae Herrich-Schäffer, 1850
- Cucullia absinthii (Linnaeus, 1761)
- Cucullia argentea (Hufnagel, 1766)
- Cucullia artemisiae (Hufnagel, 1766)
- Cucullia asteris (Denis & Schiffermuller, 1775)
- Cucullia balsamitae Boisduval, 1840
- Cucullia campanulae Freyer, 1831
- Cucullia chamomillae (Denis & Schiffermuller, 1775)
- Cucullia formosa Rogenhofer, 1860
- Cucullia fraudatrix Eversmann, 1837
- Cucullia lactucae (Denis & Schiffermuller, 1775)
- Cucullia lucifuga (Denis & Schiffermuller, 1775)
- Cucullia santonici (Hübner, 1813)
- Cucullia scopariae Dorfmeister, 1853
- Cucullia tanaceti (Denis & Schiffermuller, 1775)
- Cucullia umbratica (Linnaeus, 1758)
- Cucullia xeranthemi Boisduval, 1840
- Cucullia blattariae (Esper, 1790)
- Cucullia lanceolata (Villers, 1789)
- Cucullia lychnitis Rambur, 1833
- Cucullia prenanthis Boisduval, 1840
- Cucullia scrophulariae (Denis & Schiffermuller, 1775)
- Cucullia verbasci (Linnaeus, 1758)
- Dasypolia ferdinandi Ruhl, 1892
- Deltote bankiana (Fabricius, 1775)
- Deltote deceptoria (Scopoli, 1763)
- Deltote uncula (Clerck, 1759)
- Deltote pygarga (Hufnagel, 1766)
- Denticucullus pygmina (Haworth, 1809)
- Diachrysia chrysitis (Linnaeus, 1758)
- Diachrysia chryson (Esper, 1789)
- Diachrysia nadeja (Oberthur, 1880)
- Diachrysia zosimi (Hübner, 1822)
- Diarsia mendica (Fabricius, 1775)
- Diarsia rubi (Vieweg, 1790)
- Dichagyris flammatra (Denis & Schiffermuller, 1775)
- Dichagyris candelisequa (Denis & Schiffermuller, 1775)
- Dichagyris forcipula (Denis & Schiffermuller, 1775)
- Dichagyris melanura (Kollar, 1846)
- Dichagyris nigrescens (Hofner, 1888)
- Dichagyris orientis (Alpheraky, 1882)
- Dichagyris renigera (Hübner, 1808)
- Dichagyris signifera (Denis & Schiffermuller, 1775)
- Dichonia aeruginea (Hübner, 1808)
- Dichonia convergens (Denis & Schiffermuller, 1775)
- Dicycla oo (Linnaeus, 1758)
- Diloba caeruleocephala (Linnaeus, 1758)
- Dioszeghyana schmidti (Dioszeghy, 1935)
- Divaena haywardi (Tams, 1926)
- Dryobota labecula (Esper, 1788)
- Dryobotodes tenebrosa (Esper, 1789)
- Dryobotodes carbonis Wagner, 1931
- Dryobotodes eremita (Fabricius, 1775)
- Dryobotodes monochroma (Esper, 1790)
- Dypterygia scabriuscula (Linnaeus, 1758)
- Egira conspicillaris (Linnaeus, 1758)
- Elaphria venustula (Hübner, 1790)
- Enargia abluta (Hübner, 1808)
- Enterpia laudeti (Boisduval, 1840)
- Epilecta linogrisea (Denis & Schiffermuller, 1775)
- Epimecia ustula (Freyer, 1835)
- Epipsilia cervantes (Reisser, 1935)
- Episema glaucina (Esper, 1789)
- Episema korsakovi (Christoph, 1885)
- Episema lederi Christoph, 1885
- Episema tersa (Denis & Schiffermuller, 1775)
- Eremobia ochroleuca (Denis & Schiffermuller, 1775)
- Eucarta amethystina (Hübner, 1803)
- Eucarta virgo (Treitschke, 1835)
- Euchalcia consona (Fabricius, 1787)
- Euchalcia modestoides Poole, 1989
- Eugnorisma depuncta (Linnaeus, 1761)
- Eugraphe sigma (Denis & Schiffermuller, 1775)
- Euplexia lucipara (Linnaeus, 1758)
- Eupsilia transversa (Hufnagel, 1766)
- Euxoa aquilina (Denis & Schiffermuller, 1775)
- Euxoa birivia (Denis & Schiffermuller, 1775)
- Euxoa cos (Hübner, 1824)
- Euxoa decora (Denis & Schiffermuller, 1775)
- Euxoa hastifera (Donzel, 1847)
- Euxoa nigricans (Linnaeus, 1761)
- Euxoa nigrofusca (Esper, 1788)
- Euxoa obelisca (Denis & Schiffermuller, 1775)
- Euxoa temera (Hübner, 1808)
- Euxoa vitta (Esper, 1789)
- Evisa schawerdae Reisser, 1930
- Globia algae (Esper, 1789)
- Gortyna borelii Pierret, 1837
- Gortyna flavago (Denis & Schiffermuller, 1775)
- Gortyna puengeleri (Turati, 1909)
- Graphiphora augur (Fabricius, 1775)
- Griposia aprilina (Linnaeus, 1758)
- Hada plebeja (Linnaeus, 1761)
- Hadena irregularis (Hufnagel, 1766)
- Hadena perplexa (Denis & Schiffermuller, 1775)
- Hadena silenes (Hübner, 1822)
- Hadena syriaca (Osthelder, 1933)
- Hadena adriana (Schawerda, 1921)
- Hadena albimacula (Borkhausen, 1792)
- Hadena caesia (Denis & Schiffermuller, 1775)
- Hadena capsincola (Denis & Schiffermuller, 1775)
- Hadena clara (Staudinger, 1901)
- Hadena compta (Denis & Schiffermuller, 1775)
- Hadena confusa (Hufnagel, 1766)
- Hadena drenowskii (Rebel, 1930)
- Hadena filograna (Esper, 1788)
- Hadena gueneei (Staudinger, 1901)
- Hadena luteocincta (Rambur, 1834)
- Hadena magnolii (Boisduval, 1829)
- Hadena vulcanica (Turati, 1907)
- Haemerosia renalis (Hübner, 1813)
- Hecatera bicolorata (Hufnagel, 1766)
- Hecatera cappa (Hübner, 1809)
- Hecatera dysodea (Denis & Schiffermuller, 1775)
- Helicoverpa armigera (Hübner, 1808)
- Heliothis incarnata Freyer, 1838
- Heliothis maritima Graslin, 1855
- Heliothis nubigera Herrich-Schäffer, 1851
- Heliothis ononis (Denis & Schiffermuller, 1775)
- Heliothis peltigera (Denis & Schiffermuller, 1775)
- Heliothis viriplaca (Hufnagel, 1766)
- Helivictoria victorina (Sodoffsky, 1849)
- Hoplodrina ambigua (Denis & Schiffermuller, 1775)
- Hoplodrina blanda (Denis & Schiffermuller, 1775)
- Hoplodrina octogenaria (Goeze, 1781)
- Hoplodrina respersa (Denis & Schiffermuller, 1775)
- Hoplodrina superstes (Ochsenheimer, 1816)
- Hydraecia micacea (Esper, 1789)
- Hydraecia petasitis Doubleday, 1847
- Hyppa rectilinea (Esper, 1788)
- Ipimorpha retusa (Linnaeus, 1761)
- Ipimorpha subtusa (Denis & Schiffermuller, 1775)
- Janthinea friwaldskii (Duponchel, 1835)
- Jodia croceago (Denis & Schiffermuller, 1775)
- Lacanobia contigua (Denis & Schiffermuller, 1775)
- Lacanobia suasa (Denis & Schiffermuller, 1775)
- Lacanobia thalassina (Hufnagel, 1766)
- Lacanobia aliena (Hübner, 1809)
- Lacanobia blenna (Hübner, 1824)
- Lacanobia oleracea (Linnaeus, 1758)
- Lacanobia splendens (Hübner, 1808)
- Lacanobia w-latinum (Hufnagel, 1766)
- Lamprotes c-aureum (Knoch, 1781)
- Lasionycta proxima (Hübner, 1809)
- Lateroligia ophiogramma (Esper, 1794)
- Lenisa geminipuncta (Haworth, 1809)
- Leucania loreyi (Duponchel, 1827)
- Leucania comma (Linnaeus, 1761)
- Leucania obsoleta (Hübner, 1803)
- Leucania punctosa (Treitschke, 1825)
- Leucania putrescens (Hübner, 1824)
- Leucania zeae (Duponchel, 1827)
- Lithophane furcifera (Hufnagel, 1766)
- Lithophane ledereri (Staudinger, 1892)
- Lithophane merckii (Rambur, 1832)
- Lithophane ornitopus (Hufnagel, 1766)
- Lithophane semibrunnea (Haworth, 1809)
- Lithophane socia (Hufnagel, 1766)
- Lithophane lapidea (Hübner, 1808)
- Litoligia literosa (Haworth, 1809)
- Luperina dumerilii (Duponchel, 1826)
- Luperina nickerlii (Freyer, 1845)
- Luperina rubella (Duponchel, 1835)
- Luperina testacea (Denis & Schiffermuller, 1775)
- Macdunnoughia confusa (Stephens, 1850)
- Mamestra brassicae (Linnaeus, 1758)
- Maraschia grisescens Osthelder, 1933
- Meganephria bimaculosa (Linnaeus, 1767)
- Mesapamea secalella Remm, 1983
- Mesapamea secalis (Linnaeus, 1758)
- Mesogona acetosellae (Denis & Schiffermuller, 1775)
- Mesoligia furuncula (Denis & Schiffermuller, 1775)
- Mesotrosta signalis (Treitschke, 1829)
- Mniotype adusta (Esper, 1790)
- Mniotype satura (Denis & Schiffermuller, 1775)
- Mniotype solieri (Boisduval, 1829)
- Moma alpium (Osbeck, 1778)
- Mormo maura (Linnaeus, 1758)
- Mythimna riparia (Rambur, 1829)
- Mythimna albipuncta (Denis & Schiffermuller, 1775)
- Mythimna congrua (Hübner, 1817)
- Mythimna ferrago (Fabricius, 1787)
- Mythimna l-album (Linnaeus, 1767)
- Mythimna conigera (Denis & Schiffermuller, 1775)
- Mythimna impura (Hübner, 1808)
- Mythimna pallens (Linnaeus, 1758)
- Mythimna pudorina (Denis & Schiffermuller, 1775)
- Mythimna straminea (Treitschke, 1825)
- Mythimna turca (Linnaeus, 1761)
- Mythimna vitellina (Hübner, 1808)
- Mythimna alopecuri (Boisduval, 1840)
- Mythimna andereggii (Boisduval, 1840)
- Mythimna sicula (Treitschke, 1835)
- Naenia typica (Linnaeus, 1758)
- Noctua comes Hübner, 1813
- Noctua fimbriata (Schreber, 1759)
- Noctua interjecta Hübner, 1803
- Noctua interposita (Hübner, 1790)
- Noctua janthe (Borkhausen, 1792)
- Noctua janthina Denis & Schiffermuller, 1775
- Noctua orbona (Hufnagel, 1766)
- Noctua pronuba (Linnaeus, 1758)
- Noctua tirrenica Biebinger, Speidel & Hanigk, 1983
- Nyctobrya amasina Draudt, 1931
- Nyctobrya muralis (Forster, 1771)
- Ochropleura leucogaster (Freyer, 1831)
- Ochropleura plecta (Linnaeus, 1761)
- Oligia fasciuncula (Haworth, 1809)
- Oligia latruncula (Denis & Schiffermuller, 1775)
- Oligia strigilis (Linnaeus, 1758)
- Oligia versicolor (Borkhausen, 1792)
- Olivenebula subsericata (Herrich-Schäffer, 1861)
- Omia cymbalariae (Hübner, 1809)
- Omphalophana anatolica (Lederer, 1857)
- Omphalophana antirrhinii (Hübner, 1803)
- Opigena polygona (Denis & Schiffermuller, 1775)
- Oria musculosa (Hübner, 1808)
- Orthosia gracilis (Denis & Schiffermuller, 1775)
- Orthosia opima (Hübner, 1809)
- Orthosia cerasi (Fabricius, 1775)
- Orthosia cruda (Denis & Schiffermuller, 1775)
- Orthosia dalmatica (Wagner, 1909)
- Orthosia miniosa (Denis & Schiffermuller, 1775)
- Orthosia populeti (Fabricius, 1775)
- Orthosia incerta (Hufnagel, 1766)
- Orthosia gothica (Linnaeus, 1758)
- Oxicesta chamoenices (Herrich-Schäffer, 1845)
- Oxicesta geographica (Fabricius, 1787)
- Oxytripia orbiculosa (Esper, 1799)
- Pachetra sagittigera (Hufnagel, 1766)
- Panchrysia aurea (Hübner, 1803)
- Panchrysia v-argenteum (Esper, 1798)
- Panemeria tenebrata (Scopoli, 1763)
- Panolis flammea (Denis & Schiffermuller, 1775)
- Panthea coenobita (Esper, 1785)
- Papestra biren (Goeze, 1781)
- Parastichtis suspecta (Hübner, 1817)
- Peridroma saucia (Hübner, 1808)
- Perigrapha i-cinctum (Denis & Schiffermuller, 1775)
- Perigrapha rorida Frivaldszky, 1835
- Periphanes delphinii (Linnaeus, 1758)
- Philareta treitschkei (Frivaldszky, 1835)
- Phlogophora meticulosa (Linnaeus, 1758)
- Phlogophora scita (Hübner, 1790)
- Photedes captiuncula (Treitschke, 1825)
- Photedes extrema (Hübner, 1809)
- Photedes minima (Haworth, 1809)
- Photedes morrisii (Dale, 1837)
- Phyllophila obliterata (Rambur, 1833)
- Plusidia cheiranthi (Tauscher, 1809)
- Polia bombycina (Hufnagel, 1766)
- Polia nebulosa (Hufnagel, 1766)
- Polychrysia moneta (Fabricius, 1787)
- Polymixis culoti (Schawerda, 1921)
- Polymixis leuconota (Frivaldszky, 1841)
- Polymixis flavicincta (Denis & Schiffermuller, 1775)
- Polymixis polymita (Linnaeus, 1761)
- Polymixis rufocincta (Geyer, 1828)
- Polymixis serpentina (Treitschke, 1825)
- Polyphaenis sericata (Esper, 1787)
- Praestilbia armeniaca Staudinger, 1892
- Protoschinia scutosa (Denis & Schiffermuller, 1775)
- Pseudeustrotia candidula (Denis & Schiffermuller, 1775)
- Pseudluperina pozzii (Curo, 1883)
- Pyrrhia purpura (Hübner, 1817)
- Pyrrhia umbra (Hufnagel, 1766)
- Rhizedra lutosa (Hübner, 1803)
- Rhyacia lucipeta (Denis & Schiffermuller, 1775)
- Rhyacia simulans (Hufnagel, 1766)
- Rileyiana fovea (Treitschke, 1825)
- Schinia cardui (Hübner, 1790)
- Schinia cognata (Freyer, 1833)
- Scotochrosta pulla (Denis & Schiffermuller, 1775)
- Sesamia cretica Lederer, 1857
- Sesamia nonagrioides Lefebvre, 1827
- Sideridis rivularis (Fabricius, 1775)
- Sideridis implexa (Hübner, 1809)
- Sideridis kitti (Schawerda, 1914)
- Sideridis reticulata (Goeze, 1781)
- Sideridis lampra (Schawerda, 1913)
- Sideridis turbida (Esper, 1790)
- Simyra albovenosa (Goeze, 1781)
- Simyra dentinosa Freyer, 1838
- Simyra nervosa (Denis & Schiffermuller, 1775)
- Spaelotis ravida (Denis & Schiffermuller, 1775)
- Spaelotis senna (Freyer, 1829)
- Spodoptera exigua (Hübner, 1808)
- Standfussiana dalmata (Staudinger, 1901)
- Standfussiana lucernea (Linnaeus, 1758)
- Stenoecia dos (Freyer, 1838)
- Subacronicta megacephala (Denis & Schiffermuller, 1775)
- Syngrapha devergens (Hübner, 1813)
- Synthymia fixa (Fabricius, 1787)
- Teinoptera lunaki (Boursin, 1940)
- Teinoptera olivina (Herrich-Schäffer, 1852)
- Thalpophila matura (Hufnagel, 1766)
- Tholera cespitis (Denis & Schiffermuller, 1775)
- Tholera decimalis (Poda, 1761)
- Thysanoplusia orichalcea (Fabricius, 1775)
- Tiliacea aurago (Denis & Schiffermuller, 1775)
- Tiliacea citrago (Linnaeus, 1758)
- Tiliacea cypreago (Hampson, 1906)
- Tiliacea sulphurago (Denis & Schiffermuller, 1775)
- Trachea atriplicis (Linnaeus, 1758)
- Trichoplusia ni (Hübner, 1803)
- Trichosea ludifica (Linnaeus, 1758)
- Trigonophora flammea (Esper, 1785)
- Tyta luctuosa (Denis & Schiffermuller, 1775)
- Ulochlaena hirta (Hübner, 1813)
- Valeria jaspidea (Villers, 1789)
- Valeria oleagina (Denis & Schiffermuller, 1775)
- Xanthia gilvago (Denis & Schiffermuller, 1775)
- Xanthia icteritia (Hufnagel, 1766)
- Xanthia ocellaris (Borkhausen, 1792)
- Xanthia ruticilla (Esper, 1791)
- Xanthia togata (Esper, 1788)
- Xestia ashworthii (Doubleday, 1855)
- Xestia c-nigrum (Linnaeus, 1758)
- Xestia ditrapezium (Denis & Schiffermuller, 1775)
- Xestia speciosa (Hübner, 1813)
- Xestia baja (Denis & Schiffermuller, 1775)
- Xestia castanea (Esper, 1798)
- Xestia cohaesa (Herrich-Schäffer, 1849)
- Xestia collina (Boisduval, 1840)
- Xestia ochreago (Hübner, 1809)
- Xestia stigmatica (Hübner, 1813)
- Xestia xanthographa (Denis & Schiffermuller, 1775)
- Xylena exsoleta (Linnaeus, 1758)
- Xylena lunifera Warren, 1910
- Xylena vetusta (Hübner, 1813)

=== Nolidae ===
- Bena bicolorana (Fuessly, 1775)
- Earias clorana (Linnaeus, 1761)
- Earias vernana (Fabricius, 1787)
- Meganola albula (Denis & Schiffermuller, 1775)
- Meganola strigula (Denis & Schiffermuller, 1775)
- Nola confusalis (Herrich-Schäffer, 1847)
- Nola cristatula (Hübner, 1793)
- Nola cucullatella (Linnaeus, 1758)
- Nola subchlamydula Staudinger, 1871
- Nycteola asiatica (Krulikovsky, 1904)
- Nycteola columbana (Turner, 1925)
- Nycteola revayana (Scopoli, 1772)
- Nycteola siculana (Fuchs, 1899)
- Pseudoips prasinana (Linnaeus, 1758)

=== Notodontidae ===
- Cerura erminea (Esper, 1783)
- Cerura vinula (Linnaeus, 1758)
- Clostera anachoreta (Denis & Schiffermuller, 1775)
- Clostera anastomosis (Linnaeus, 1758)
- Clostera curtula (Linnaeus, 1758)
- Clostera pigra (Hufnagel, 1766)
- Dicranura ulmi (Denis & Schiffermuller, 1775)
- Drymonia dodonaea (Denis & Schiffermuller, 1775)
- Drymonia obliterata (Esper, 1785)
- Drymonia querna (Denis & Schiffermuller, 1775)
- Drymonia ruficornis (Hufnagel, 1766)
- Drymonia velitaris (Hufnagel, 1766)
- Furcula bicuspis (Borkhausen, 1790)
- Furcula bifida (Brahm, 1787)
- Furcula furcula (Clerck, 1759)
- Gluphisia crenata (Esper, 1785)
- Harpyia milhauseri (Fabricius, 1775)
- Notodonta dromedarius (Linnaeus, 1767)
- Notodonta tritophus (Denis & Schiffermuller, 1775)
- Notodonta ziczac (Linnaeus, 1758)
- Peridea anceps (Goeze, 1781)
- Peridea korbi (Rebel, 1918)
- Phalera bucephala (Linnaeus, 1758)
- Phalera bucephaloides (Ochsenheimer, 1810)
- Pheosia gnoma (Fabricius, 1776)
- Pheosia tremula (Clerck, 1759)
- Pterostoma palpina (Clerck, 1759)
- Ptilodon capucina (Linnaeus, 1758)
- Ptilodon cucullina (Denis & Schiffermuller, 1775)
- Spatalia argentina (Denis & Schiffermuller, 1775)
- Stauropus fagi (Linnaeus, 1758)
- Thaumetopoea processionea (Linnaeus, 1758)
- Thaumetopoea solitaria (Freyer, 1838)

=== Oecophoridae ===
- Alabonia staintoniella (Zeller, 1850)
- Borkhausenia minutella (Linnaeus, 1758)
- Crassa tinctella (Hübner, 1796)
- Dasycera oliviella (Fabricius, 1794)
- Denisia ragonotella (Constant, 1885)
- Denisia stipella (Linnaeus, 1758)
- Endrosis sarcitrella (Linnaeus, 1758)
- Harpella forficella (Scopoli, 1763)
- Holoscolia huebneri Kocak, 1980
- Metalampra cinnamomea (Zeller, 1839)
- Minetia criella (Treitschke, 1835)
- Minetia labiosella (Hübner, 1810)
- Oecophora bractella (Linnaeus, 1758)
- Oecophora superior (Rebel, 1918)
- Pleurota aristella (Linnaeus, 1767)
- Pleurota bicostella (Clerck, 1759)
- Pleurota proteella Staudinger, 1880
- Pleurota pyropella (Denis & Schiffermuller, 1775)
- Pleurota punctella (O. Costa, 1836)
- Schiffermuelleria schaefferella (Linnaeus, 1758)

=== Opostegidae ===
- Opostega salaciella (Treitschke, 1833)
- Opostega spatulella Herrich-Schäffer, 1855
- Pseudopostega crepusculella (Zeller, 1839)

=== Peleopodidae ===
- Carcina quercana (Fabricius, 1775)

=== Plutellidae ===
- Eidophasia messingiella (Fischer von Röslerstamm, 1840)
- Plutella xylostella (Linnaeus, 1758)

=== Praydidae ===
- Atemelia torquatella (Lienig & Zeller, 1846)

=== Psychidae ===
- Dahlica triquetrella (Hübner, 1813)
- Penestoglossa dardoinella (Milliere, 1863)
- Rebelia surientella (Bruand, 1858)

=== Pterophoridae ===
- Amblyptilia acanthadactyla (Hübner, 1813)
- Calyciphora albodactylus (Fabricius, 1794)
- Calyciphora nephelodactyla (Eversmann, 1844)
- Capperia celeusi (Frey, 1886)
- Capperia hellenica Adamczewski, 1951
- Cnaemidophorus rhododactyla (Denis & Schiffermuller, 1775)
- Crombrugghia distans (Zeller, 1847)
- Crombrugghia laetus (Zeller, 1847)
- Emmelina monodactyla (Linnaeus, 1758)
- Geina didactyla (Linnaeus, 1758)
- Gillmeria ochrodactyla (Denis & Schiffermuller, 1775)
- Hellinsia carphodactyla (Hübner, 1813)
- Hellinsia osteodactylus (Zeller, 1841)
- Hellinsia tephradactyla (Hübner, 1813)
- Merrifieldia baliodactylus (Zeller, 1841)
- Merrifieldia leucodactyla (Denis & Schiffermuller, 1775)
- Oidaematophorus lithodactyla (Treitschke, 1833)
- Oxyptilus ericetorum (Stainton, 1851)
- Oxyptilus parvidactyla (Haworth, 1811)
- Oxyptilus pilosellae (Zeller, 1841)
- Paraplatyptilia metzneri (Zeller, 1841)
- Paraplatyptilia terminalis (Erschoff, 1877)
- Platyptilia calodactyla (Denis & Schiffermuller, 1775)
- Pselnophorus heterodactyla (Muller, 1764)
- Pterophorus ischnodactyla (Treitschke, 1835)
- Pterophorus pentadactyla (Linnaeus, 1758)
- Stenoptilia bipunctidactyla (Scopoli, 1763)
- Stenoptilia coprodactylus (Stainton, 1851)
- Stenoptilia mannii (Zeller, 1852)
- Stenoptilia pelidnodactyla (Stein, 1837)
- Stenoptilia pterodactyla (Linnaeus, 1761)
- Stenoptilia stigmatodactylus (Zeller, 1852)
- Stenoptilia zophodactylus (Duponchel, 1840)
- Wheeleria obsoletus (Zeller, 1841)

=== Pyralidae ===
- Acrobasis consociella (Hübner, 1813)
- Acrobasis dulcella (Zeller, 1848)
- Acrobasis glaucella Staudinger, 1859
- Acrobasis legatea (Haworth, 1811)
- Acrobasis marmorea (Haworth, 1811)
- Acrobasis obliqua (Zeller, 1847)
- Acrobasis sodalella Zeller, 1848
- Acrobasis suavella (Zincken, 1818)
- Acrobasis tumidana (Denis & Schiffermuller, 1775)
- Aglossa caprealis (Hübner, 1809)
- Aglossa pinguinalis (Linnaeus, 1758)
- Ancylosis cinnamomella (Duponchel, 1836)
- Ancylosis roscidella (Eversmann, 1844)
- Aphomia sociella (Linnaeus, 1758)
- Asarta aethiopella (Duponchel, 1837)
- Cadra calidella (Guenee, 1845)
- Cadra figulilella (Gregson, 1871)
- Catastia marginea (Denis & Schiffermuller, 1775)
- Delplanqueia dilutella (Denis & Schiffermuller, 1775)
- Denticera divisella (Duponchel, 1842)
- Dioryctria sylvestrella (Ratzeburg, 1840)
- Eccopisa effractella Zeller, 1848
- Ematheudes punctella (Treitschke, 1833)
- Endotricha flammealis (Denis & Schiffermuller, 1775)
- Ephestia elutella (Hübner, 1796)
- Ephestia kuehniella Zeller, 1879
- Ephestia unicolorella Staudinger, 1881
- Ephestia welseriella (Zeller, 1848)
- Epidauria strigosa (Staudinger, 1879)
- Epischnia prodromella (Hübner, 1799)
- Episcythrastis tetricella (Denis & Schiffermuller, 1775)
- Etiella zinckenella (Treitschke, 1832)
- Eurhodope cirrigerella (Zincken, 1818)
- Eurhodope rosella (Scopoli, 1763)
- Euzophera bigella (Zeller, 1848)
- Euzophera cinerosella (Zeller, 1839)
- Euzophera pinguis (Haworth, 1811)
- Euzophera pulchella Ragonot, 1887
- Euzopherodes vapidella (Mann, 1857)
- Galleria mellonella (Linnaeus, 1758)
- Glyptoteles leucacrinella Zeller, 1848
- Homoeosoma nebulella (Denis & Schiffermuller, 1775)
- Homoeosoma nimbella (Duponchel, 1837)
- Homoeosoma sinuella (Fabricius, 1794)
- Hypochalcia ahenella (Denis & Schiffermuller, 1775)
- Hypochalcia dignella (Hübner, 1796)
- Hypochalcia lignella (Hübner, 1796)
- Hypsopygia costalis (Fabricius, 1775)
- Hypsopygia fulvocilialis (Duponchel, 1834)
- Hypsopygia glaucinalis (Linnaeus, 1758)
- Hypsopygia rubidalis (Denis & Schiffermuller, 1775)
- Hypsotropa limbella Zeller, 1848
- Lamoria anella (Denis & Schiffermuller, 1775)
- Megasis rippertella (Zeller, 1839)
- Merulempista cingillella (Zeller, 1846)
- Moitrelia obductella (Zeller, 1839)
- Myelois circumvoluta (Fourcroy, 1785)
- Nephopterix angustella (Hübner, 1796)
- Nyctegretis lineana (Scopoli, 1786)
- Oncocera semirubella (Scopoli, 1763)
- Ortholepis betulae (Goeze, 1778)
- Pempelia palumbella (Denis & Schiffermuller, 1775)
- Pempeliella ornatella (Denis & Schiffermuller, 1775)
- Pempeliella sororiella Zeller, 1839
- Phycita coronatella (Guenee, 1845)
- Phycita meliella (Mann, 1864)
- Phycitodes binaevella (Hübner, 1813)
- Plodia interpunctella (Hübner, 1813)
- Psorosa dahliella (Treitschke, 1832)
- Psorosa mediterranella Amsel, 1953
- Pterothrixidia rufella (Duponchel, 1836)
- Pyralis farinalis (Linnaeus, 1758)
- Pyralis regalis Denis & Schiffermuller, 1775
- Rhodophaea formosa (Haworth, 1811)
- Selagia spadicella (Hübner, 1796)
- Selagia subochrella (Herrich-Schäffer, 1849)
- Stemmatophora brunnealis (Treitschke, 1829)
- Stemmatophora honestalis (Treitschke, 1829)
- Synaphe antennalis (Fabricius, 1794)
- Synaphe moldavica (Esper, 1794)
- Synaphe punctalis (Fabricius, 1775)
- Trachonitis cristella (Denis & Schiffermuller, 1775)
- Vitula biviella (Zeller, 1848)

=== Saturniidae ===
- Aglia tau (Linnaeus, 1758)
- Saturnia pavoniella (Scopoli, 1763)
- Saturnia spini (Denis & Schiffermuller, 1775)
- Saturnia caecigena Kupido, 1825
- Saturnia pyri (Denis & Schiffermuller, 1775)

=== Scythrididae ===
- Enolmis desidella (Lederer, 1855)
- Scythris albidella (Stainton, 1867)
- Scythris crassiuscula (Herrich-Schäffer, 1855)
- Scythris crypta Hannemann, 1961
- Scythris disparella (Tengstrom, 1848)
- Scythris dissimilella (Herrich-Schäffer, 1855)
- Scythris ericetella (Heinemann, 1872)
- Scythris gravatella (Zeller, 1847)
- Scythris knochella (Fabricius, 1794)
- Scythris laminella (Denis & Schiffermuller, 1775)
- Scythris moldavicella Caradja, 1905
- Scythris oelandicella Muller-Rutz, 1922
- Scythris pascuella (Zeller, 1855)
- Scythris picaepennis (Haworth, 1828)
- Scythris productella (Zeller, 1839)
- Scythris schleichiella (Zeller, 1870)
- Scythris subschleichiella Hannemann, 1961
- Scythris subseliniella (Heinemann, 1876)
- Scythris tabidella (Herrich-Schäffer, 1855)
- Scythris tergestinella (Zeller, 1855)
- Scythris tributella (Zeller, 1847)
- Scythris vittella (O. Costa, 1834)

=== Sesiidae ===
- Bembecia albanensis (Rebel, 1918)
- Bembecia ichneumoniformis (Denis & Schiffermuller, 1775)
- Bembecia megillaeformis (Hübner, 1813)
- Bembecia pavicevici Tosevski, 1989
- Bembecia scopigera (Scopoli, 1763)
- Bembecia uroceriformis (Treitschke, 1834)
- Chamaesphecia aerifrons (Zeller, 1847)
- Chamaesphecia annellata (Zeller, 1847)
- Chamaesphecia astatiformis (Herrich-Schäffer, 1846)
- Chamaesphecia bibioniformis (Esper, 1800)
- Chamaesphecia chalciformis (Esper, 1804)
- Chamaesphecia doleriformis (Herrich-Schäffer, 1846)
- Chamaesphecia dumonti Le Cerf, 1922
- Chamaesphecia empiformis (Esper, 1783)
- Chamaesphecia euceraeformis (Ochsenheimer, 1816)
- Chamaesphecia leucopsiformis (Esper, 1800)
- Chamaesphecia masariformis (Ochsenheimer, 1808)
- Chamaesphecia nigrifrons (Le Cerf, 1911)
- Chamaesphecia schmidtiiformis (Freyer, 1836)
- Chamaesphecia tenthrediniformis (Denis & Schiffermuller, 1775)
- Paranthrene diaphana Dalla Torre & Strand, 1925
- Paranthrene insolitus Le Cerf, 1914
- Paranthrene tabaniformis (Rottemburg, 1775)
- Pennisetia hylaeiformis (Laspeyres, 1801)
- Pyropteron affinis (Staudinger, 1856)
- Pyropteron leucomelaena (Zeller, 1847)
- Pyropteron triannuliformis (Freyer, 1843)
- Sesia apiformis (Clerck, 1759)
- Synanthedon andrenaeformis (Laspeyres, 1801)
- Synanthedon cephiformis (Ochsenheimer, 1808)
- Synanthedon conopiformis (Esper, 1782)
- Synanthedon culiciformis (Linnaeus, 1758)
- Synanthedon formicaeformis (Esper, 1783)
- Synanthedon loranthi (Kralicek, 1966)
- Synanthedon melliniformis (Laspeyres, 1801)
- Synanthedon mesiaeformis (Herrich-Schäffer, 1846)
- Synanthedon myopaeformis (Borkhausen, 1789)
- Synanthedon spheciformis (Denis & Schiffermuller, 1775)
- Synanthedon spuleri (Fuchs, 1908)
- Synanthedon stomoxiformis (Hübner, 1790)
- Synanthedon tipuliformis (Clerck, 1759)
- Synanthedon vespiformis (Linnaeus, 1761)
- Tinthia brosiformis (Hübner, 1813)
- Tinthia tineiformis (Esper, 1789)

=== Sphingidae ===
- Acherontia atropos (Linnaeus, 1758)
- Agrius convolvuli (Linnaeus, 1758)
- Daphnis nerii (Linnaeus, 1758)
- Deilephila elpenor (Linnaeus, 1758)
- Deilephila porcellus (Linnaeus, 1758)
- Hemaris croatica (Esper, 1800)
- Hemaris fuciformis (Linnaeus, 1758)
- Hemaris tityus (Linnaeus, 1758)
- Hippotion celerio (Linnaeus, 1758)
- Hyles euphorbiae (Linnaeus, 1758)
- Hyles livornica (Esper, 1780)
- Laothoe populi (Linnaeus, 1758)
- Macroglossum stellatarum (Linnaeus, 1758)
- Marumba quercus (Denis & Schiffermuller, 1775)
- Mimas tiliae (Linnaeus, 1758)
- Smerinthus ocellata (Linnaeus, 1758)
- Sphinx ligustri Linnaeus, 1758

=== Thyrididae ===
- Thyris fenestrella (Scopoli, 1763)

=== Tineidae ===
- Ateliotum hungaricellum Zeller, 1839
- Cephimallota crassiflavella Bruand, 1851
- Eudarcia confusella (Heydenreich, 1851)
- Eudarcia granulatella (Zeller, 1852)
- Euplocamus anthracinalis (Scopoli, 1763)
- Haplotinea insectella (Fabricius, 1794)
- Infurcitinea captans Gozmany, 1960
- Monopis monachella (Hübner, 1796)
- Monopis obviella (Denis & Schiffermuller, 1775)
- Morophaga choragella (Denis & Schiffermuller, 1775)
- Nemapogon cloacella (Haworth, 1828)
- Nemapogon inconditella (Lucas, 1956)
- Nemapogon variatella (Clemens, 1859)
- Niditinea fuscella (Linnaeus, 1758)
- Scardia boletella (Fabricius, 1794)
- Triaxomera parasitella (Hübner, 1796)

=== Tortricidae ===
- Acleris bergmanniana (Linnaeus, 1758)
- Acleris hastiana (Linnaeus, 1758)
- Acleris holmiana (Linnaeus, 1758)
- Acleris kochiella (Goeze, 1783)
- Acleris quercinana (Zeller, 1849)
- Acleris rhombana (Denis & Schiffermuller, 1775)
- Acleris schalleriana (Linnaeus, 1761)
- Acleris variegana (Denis & Schiffermuller, 1775)
- Adoxophyes orana (Fischer v. Röslerstamm, 1834)
- Aethes ardezana (Muller-Rutz, 1922)
- Aethes beatricella (Walsingham, 1898)
- Agapeta zoegana (Linnaeus, 1767)
- Aleimma loeflingiana (Linnaeus, 1758)
- Ancylis achatana (Denis & Schiffermuller, 1775)
- Ancylis apicella (Denis & Schiffermuller, 1775)
- Ancylis badiana (Denis & Schiffermuller, 1775)
- Ancylis comptana (Frolich, 1828)
- Ancylis geminana (Donovan, 1806)
- Ancylis laetana (Fabricius, 1775)
- Ancylis mitterbacheriana (Denis & Schiffermuller, 1775)
- Ancylis paludana Barrett, 1871
- Ancylis selenana (Guenee, 1845)
- Ancylis tineana (Hübner, 1799)
- Ancylis upupana (Treitschke, 1835)
- Aphelia viburniana (Denis & Schiffermuller, 1775)
- Aphelia ferugana (Hübner, 1793)
- Aphelia paleana (Hübner, 1793)
- Apotomis capreana (Hübner, 1817)
- Apotomis inundana (Denis & Schiffermuller, 1775)
- Apotomis semifasciana (Haworth, 1811)
- Archips crataegana (Hübner, 1799)
- Archips podana (Scopoli, 1763)
- Archips rosana (Linnaeus, 1758)
- Archips xylosteana (Linnaeus, 1758)
- Argyroploce arbutella (Linnaeus, 1758)
- Aterpia corticana (Denis & Schiffermuller, 1775)
- Bactra furfurana (Haworth, 1811)
- Bactra lancealana (Hübner, 1799)
- Cacoecimorpha pronubana (Hübner, 1799)
- Celypha cespitana (Hübner, 1817)
- Celypha lacunana (Denis & Schiffermuller, 1775)
- Celypha rivulana (Scopoli, 1763)
- Celypha rufana (Scopoli, 1763)
- Celypha striana (Denis & Schiffermuller, 1775)
- Choristoneura hebenstreitella (Muller, 1764)
- Clepsis balcanica (Rebel, 1917)
- Clepsis pallidana (Fabricius, 1776)
- Clepsis rolandriana (Linnaeus, 1758)
- Clepsis rurinana (Linnaeus, 1758)
- Clepsis senecionana (Hübner, 1819)
- Clepsis spectrana (Treitschke, 1830)
- Clepsis steineriana (Hübner, 1799)
- Cnephasia alticolana (Herrich-Schäffer, 1851)
- Cnephasia asseclana (Denis & Schiffermuller, 1775)
- Cnephasia minima Razowski, 1959
- Cnephasia stephensiana (Doubleday, 1849)
- Cnephasia abrasana (Duponchel, 1843)
- Cnephasia incertana (Treitschke, 1835)
- Cochylidia rupicola (Curtis, 1834)
- Cochylimorpha jucundana (Treitschke, 1835)
- Cochylis flaviciliana (Westwood, 1854)
- Cochylis pallidana Zeller, 1847
- Cydia corollana (Hübner, 1823)
- Cydia cosmophorana (Treitschke, 1835)
- Cydia fagiglandana (Zeller, 1841)
- Cydia ilipulana (Walsingham, 1903)
- Cydia inquinatana (Hübner, 1800)
- Cydia nigricana (Fabricius, 1794)
- Cydia pomonella (Linnaeus, 1758)
- Cydia splendana (Hübner, 1799)
- Cydia strobilella (Linnaeus, 1758)
- Cydia succedana (Denis & Schiffermuller, 1775)
- Dichelia histrionana (Frolich, 1828)
- Dichrorampha alpigenana (Heinemann, 1863)
- Dichrorampha alpinana (Treitschke, 1830)
- Dichrorampha ligulana (Herrich-Schäffer, 1851)
- Dichrorampha montanana (Duponchel, 1843)
- Dichrorampha petiverella (Linnaeus, 1758)
- Dichrorampha plumbagana (Treitschke, 1830)
- Dichrorampha sequana (Hübner, 1799)
- Dichrorampha simpliciana (Haworth, 1811)
- Eana herzegovinae Razowski, 1959
- Eana argentana (Clerck, 1759)
- Eana canescana (Guenee, 1845)
- Enarmonia formosana (Scopoli, 1763)
- Endothenia gentianaeana (Hübner, 1799)
- Endothenia quadrimaculana (Haworth, 1811)
- Epagoge grotiana (Fabricius, 1781)
- Epiblema hepaticana (Treitschke, 1835)
- Epiblema scutulana (Denis & Schiffermuller, 1775)
- Epiblema sticticana (Fabricius, 1794)
- Epinotia abbreviana (Fabricius, 1794)
- Epinotia fraternana (Haworth, 1811)
- Epinotia immundana (Fischer v. Röslerstamm, 1839)
- Epinotia nanana (Treitschke, 1835)
- Epinotia nigricana (Herrich-Schäffer, 1851)
- Epinotia nisella (Clerck, 1759)
- Epinotia pusillana (Peyerimhoff, 1863)
- Epinotia subsequana (Haworth, 1811)
- Epinotia tedella (Clerck, 1759)
- Epinotia tenerana (Denis & Schiffermuller, 1775)
- Eucosma aspidiscana (Hübner, 1817)
- Eucosma cana (Haworth, 1811)
- Eucosma conterminana (Guenee, 1845)
- Eucosma hohenwartiana (Denis & Schiffermuller, 1775)
- Eucosma obumbratana (Lienig & Zeller, 1846)
- Eulia ministrana (Linnaeus, 1758)
- Fulvoclysia nerminae Kocak, 1982
- Grapholita funebrana Treitschke, 1835
- Grapholita molesta (Busck, 1916)
- Grapholita compositella (Fabricius, 1775)
- Grapholita delineana Walker, 1863
- Grapholita gemmiferana Treitschke, 1835
- Grapholita internana (Guenee, 1845)
- Gypsonoma aceriana (Duponchel, 1843)
- Gypsonoma dealbana (Frolich, 1828)
- Gypsonoma minutana (Hübner, 1799)
- Hedya nubiferana (Haworth, 1811)
- Hedya pruniana (Hübner, 1799)
- Hedya salicella (Linnaeus, 1758)
- Isotrias hybridana (Hübner, 1817)
- Isotrias rectifasciana (Haworth, 1811)
- Lathronympha strigana (Fabricius, 1775)
- Lozotaenia forsterana (Fabricius, 1781)
- Neosphaleroptera nubilana (Hübner, 1799)
- Notocelia roborana (Denis & Schiffermuller, 1775)
- Notocelia trimaculana (Haworth, 1811)
- Notocelia uddmanniana (Linnaeus, 1758)
- Olethreutes arcuella (Clerck, 1759)
- Orthotaenia undulana (Denis & Schiffermuller, 1775)
- Pammene germmana (Hübner, 1799)
- Pammene rhediella (Clerck, 1759)
- Pandemis cerasana (Hübner, 1786)
- Pandemis cinnamomeana (Treitschke, 1830)
- Pandemis corylana (Fabricius, 1794)
- Pandemis dumetana (Treitschke, 1835)
- Pandemis heparana (Denis & Schiffermuller, 1775)
- Paramesia gnomana (Clerck, 1759)
- Pelochrista caecimaculana (Hübner, 1799)
- Phiaris stibiana (Guenee, 1845)
- Phiaris umbrosana (Freyer, 1842)
- Philedone gerningana (Denis & Schiffermuller, 1775)
- Phtheochroa duponchelana (Duponchel, 1843)
- Phtheochroa frigidana (Guenee, 1845)
- Phtheochroa inopiana (Haworth, 1811)
- Phtheochroa purana (Guenee, 1845)
- Pseudargyrotoza conwagana (Fabricius, 1775)
- Pseudococcyx mughiana (Zeller, 1868)
- Pseudococcyx turionella (Linnaeus, 1758)
- Pseudohermenias abietana (Fabricius, 1787)
- Pseudosciaphila branderiana (Linnaeus, 1758)
- Ptycholoma lecheana (Linnaeus, 1758)
- Retinia resinella (Linnaeus, 1758)
- Rhyacionia buoliana (Denis & Schiffermuller, 1775)
- Sparganothis pilleriana (Denis & Schiffermuller, 1775)
- Spatalistis bifasciana (Hübner, 1787)
- Spilonota ocellana (Denis & Schiffermuller, 1775)
- Stictea mygindiana (Denis & Schiffermuller, 1775)
- Syndemis musculana (Hübner, 1799)
- Thiodia citrana (Hübner, 1799)
- Tortricodes alternella (Denis & Schiffermuller, 1775)
- Tortrix viridana Linnaeus, 1758
- Zeiraphera isertana (Fabricius, 1794)

=== Yponomeutidae ===
- Kessleria saxifragae (Stainton, 1868)
- Kessleria alpicella (Stainton, 1851)
- Scythropia crataegella (Linnaeus, 1767)

=== Ypsolophidae ===
- Ypsolopha chazariella (Mann, 1866)
- Ypsolopha dentella (Fabricius, 1775)
- Ypsolopha lucella (Fabricius, 1775)
- Ypsolopha parenthesella (Linnaeus, 1761)
- Ypsolopha sequella (Clerck, 1759)

=== Zygaenidae ===
- Adscita albanica (Naufock, 1926)
- Adscita geryon (Hübner, 1813)
- Adscita statices (Linnaeus, 1758)
- Adscita mannii (Lederer, 1853)
- Jordanita chloros (Hübner, 1813)
- Jordanita globulariae (Hübner, 1793)
- Rhagades pruni (Denis & Schiffermuller, 1775)
- Zygaena carniolica (Scopoli, 1763)
- Zygaena brizae (Esper, 1800)
- Zygaena cynarae (Esper, 1789)
- Zygaena minos (Denis & Schiffermuller, 1775)
- Zygaena punctum Ochsenheimer, 1808
- Zygaena purpuralis (Brunnich, 1763)
- Zygaena angelicae Ochsenheimer, 1808
- Zygaena ephialtes (Linnaeus, 1767)
- Zygaena exulans (Hohenwarth, 1792)
- Zygaena filipendulae (Linnaeus, 1758)
- Zygaena lonicerae (Scheven, 1777)
- Zygaena loti (Denis & Schiffermuller, 1775)
- Zygaena osterodensis Reiss, 1921
- Zygaena viciae (Denis & Schiffermuller, 1775)
