= Calocucullia =

Scientific classification
- Kingdom: Animalia
- Phylum: Arthropoda
- Clade: Pancrustacea
- Class: Insecta
- Order: Lepidoptera
- Superfamily: Noctuoidea
- Family: Noctuidae
- Genus: Calocucullia; Ronkay & Ronkay, 1987

Genus of moths

Calocucullia is a genus of moths of the family Noctuidae.

== Species ==
- Calocucullia celsiae (Herrich-Schäffer, 1850)
