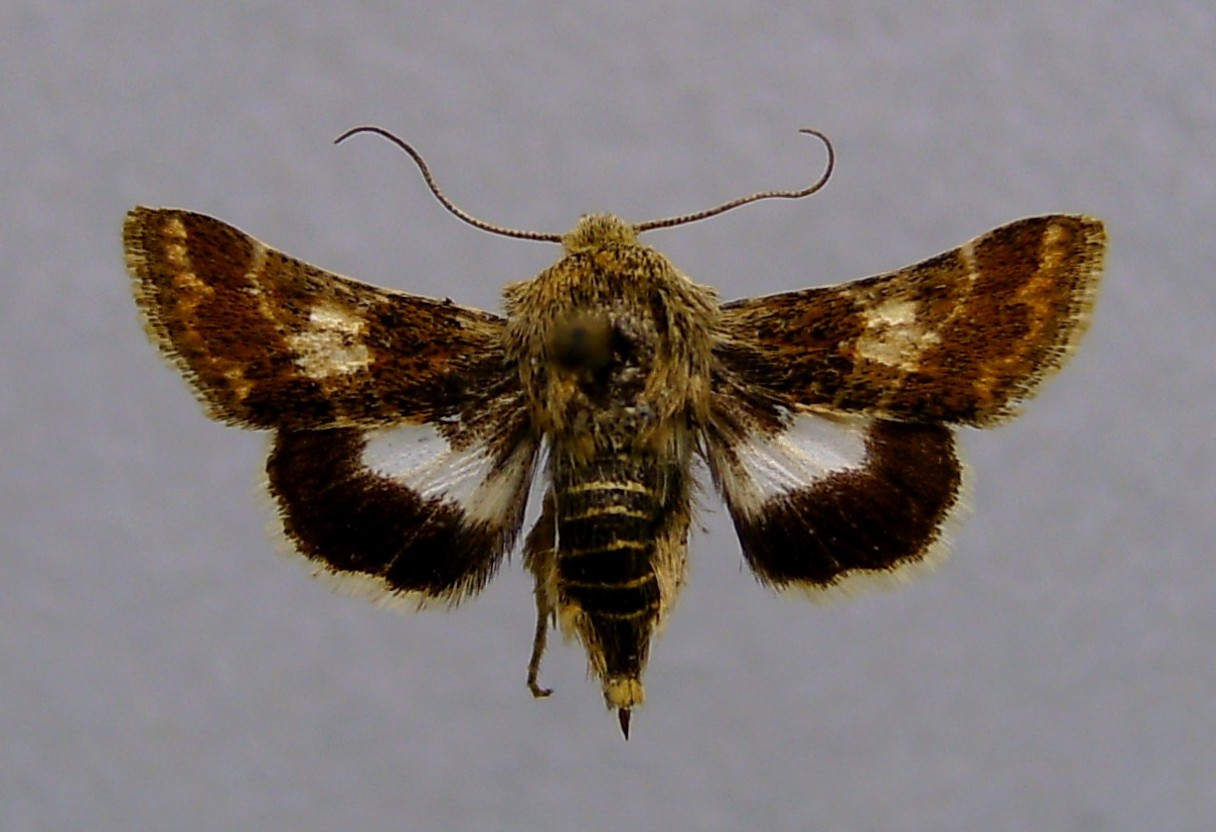

Scientific classification
- Domain: Eukaryota
- Kingdom: Animalia
- Phylum: Arthropoda
- Class: Insecta
- Order: Lepidoptera
- Superfamily: Noctuoidea
- Family: Noctuidae
- Genus: Schinia
- Species: S. cognata

Binomial name
- Schinia cognata (Freyer, 1833)

= Schinia cognata =

Species of moth

Schinia cognata is a moth of the family Noctuidae. It is found in south-eastern Europe (from the Balkans to the Czech Republic and from Ukraine to France and Italy.) and Turkey.

The wingspan is 15–22 mm. Adults are on wing from June to July.
