= Ectoedemia gilvipennella =

Scientific classification
- Kingdom: Animalia
- Phylum: Arthropoda
- Clade: Pancrustacea
- Class: Insecta
- Order: Lepidoptera
- Family: Nepticulidae
- Genus: Ectoedemia
- Species: E. gilvipennella

Binomial name
- Ectoedemia gilvipennella (Klimesch, 1946)

Synonyms
- Stigmella gilvipennella Klimesch, 1946

Species of moth

Ectoedemia gilvipennella is a moth of the family Nepticulidae. It is found from the Czech Republic and Slovakia to Italy and Greece.

The wingspan is 4.4-5.4 mm. Adults are on wing from April to June. There is one generation per year.
