= Schinia cardui =

Scientific classification
- Kingdom: Animalia
- Phylum: Arthropoda
- Clade: Pancrustacea
- Class: Insecta
- Order: Lepidoptera
- Superfamily: Noctuoidea
- Family: Noctuidae
- Genus: Schinia
- Species: S. cardui

Binomial name
- Schinia cardui (Hübner, 1790)

Synonyms
- Phalaena cardui Hübner, 1790; Melicleptria cardui (Hübner, 1790)

Species of moth

Schinia cardui is a moth of the family Noctuidae. It is found in southern and south-eastern Europe.

The larvae feed on Picris hieracioides.
