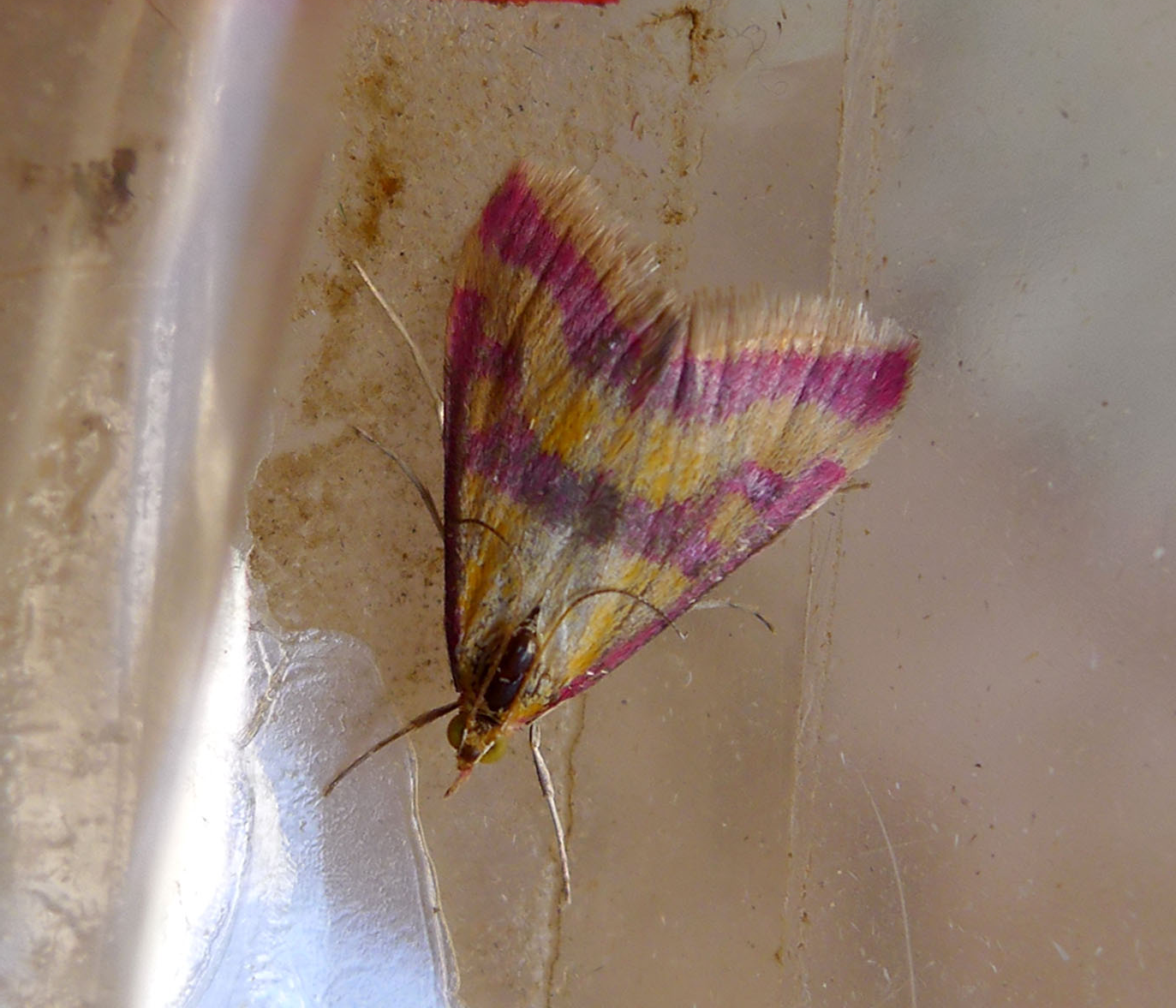

Scientific classification
- Domain: Eukaryota
- Kingdom: Animalia
- Phylum: Arthropoda
- Class: Insecta
- Order: Lepidoptera
- Family: Crambidae
- Genus: Pyrausta
- Species: P. castalis

Binomial name
- Pyrausta castalis Treitschke, 1829

= Pyrausta castalis =

Species of moth

Pyrausta castalis is a species of moth in the family Crambidae. It is found in Russia, the Czech Republic, the Balkan Peninsula, Italy, France and Spain. It has also been recorded from Turkey.

The wingspan is about 16 mm.
