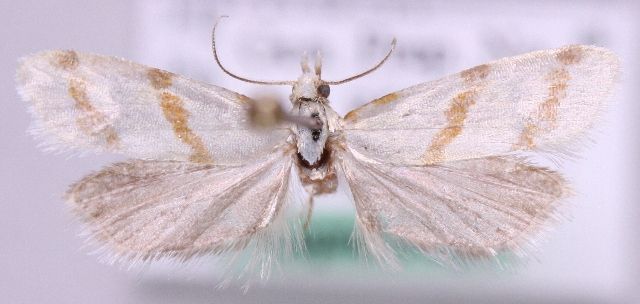

Scientific classification
- Domain: Eukaryota
- Kingdom: Animalia
- Phylum: Arthropoda
- Class: Insecta
- Order: Lepidoptera
- Family: Tortricidae
- Genus: Aethes
- Species: A. beatricella

Binomial name
- Aethes beatricella (Walsingham, 1898)

Synonyms
- Lozopera beatricella Walsingham, 1898

= Aethes beatricella =

Species of moth

Aethes beatricella, commonly known as the hemlock yellow conch, is a species of moth in the family Tortricidae. It was described by Walsingham in 1898. This moth is found in Great Britain, Sweden, Denmark, the Netherlands, France, Spain, Italy, Austria, the Czech Republic, Slovakia, Hungary, Bosnia and Herzegovina, Romania, Ukraine, Russia and Algeria. Its habitat include waste grounds, woodland fringes and hedgerows.

The wingspan of Aethes beatricella ranges from 14–17 millimetres (0.55–0.67 in). Adult moths are typically active from June to July.

The larvae of this species primarily feed on Pastinaca sativa and Conium species.
