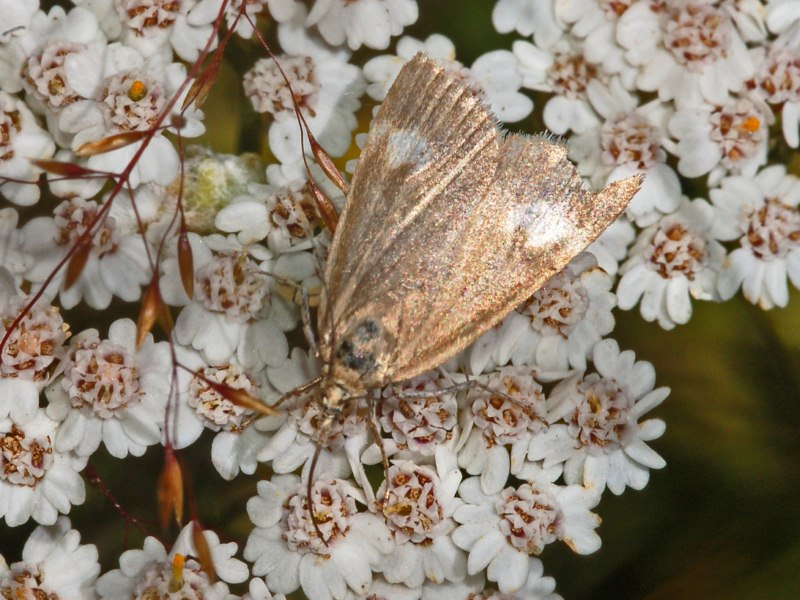

Scientific classification
- Domain: Eukaryota
- Kingdom: Animalia
- Phylum: Arthropoda
- Class: Insecta
- Order: Lepidoptera
- Family: Crambidae
- Genus: Udea
- Species: U. alpinalis

Binomial name
- Udea alpinalis (Denis & Schiffermüller, 1775)

Synonyms
- Pyralis alpinalis Denis & Schiffermüller, 1775; Phalaena grisealis Fabricius, 1794; Pyrausta alpinalis ab. prolongata Weber, 1945; Udea alpinalis valerialis (Galvagni, 1933); Udea valerianalis Speidel, 1996

= Udea alpinalis =

Species of moth

Udea alpinalis is a moth of the family Crambidae. The species was first described by Michael Denis and Ignaz Schiffermüller in 1775. It is an alpine species found in Europe.

The wingspan is 15–17 mm. The moth flies from June to August depending on the location.

It exhibits sexual dimorphism, where females have shorter, more acute forewings and the dorsal side of the hindwings are darker than that of males. The larvae feed on Senecio species (ragworts and groundsels).
