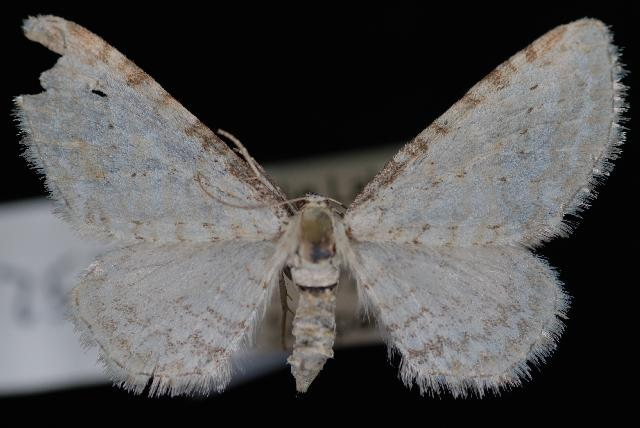

Scientific classification
- Kingdom: Animalia
- Phylum: Arthropoda
- Class: Insecta
- Order: Lepidoptera
- Family: Geometridae
- Genus: Eupithecia
- Species: E. cretaceata

Binomial name
- Eupithecia cretaceata (Packard, 1874)

Synonyms
- Larentia cretaceata Packard, 1874; Eupithecia fenestrata Milliere, 1874

= Eupithecia cretaceata =

Species of moth

Eupithecia cretaceata is a moth in the family Geometridae. It is widely distributed in Canada and much of the United States. In Europe, it is found in France, Switzerland, Austria and parts of the Balkan Peninsula.

The wingspan is about 26 mm. The adults are on wing from June to September in North America.

The larvae feed on the flowers and seeds of Veratrum viride in North America and Veratrum album in Europe.

== Subspecies ==
- Eupithecia cretaceata cretaceata (North America)
- Eupithecia cretaceata fenestrata Millière, 1874 (Europe)
