= Eupithecia spissilineata =

Scientific classification
- Domain: Eukaryota
- Kingdom: Animalia
- Phylum: Arthropoda
- Class: Insecta
- Order: Lepidoptera
- Family: Geometridae
- Genus: Eupithecia
- Species: E. spissilineata

Binomial name
- Eupithecia spissilineata (Metzner, 1846)

Synonyms
- Larentia spissilineata Metzner, 1846; Eupithecia multilineata Mann, 1866

Species of moth

Eupithecia spissilineata is a moth in the family Geometridae. It is found in the southern Alps of France, as well as Italy, Bosnia and Herzegovina, North Macedonia, Greece, Bulgaria, Romania and Ukraine.

The wingspan is about 17 mm.
