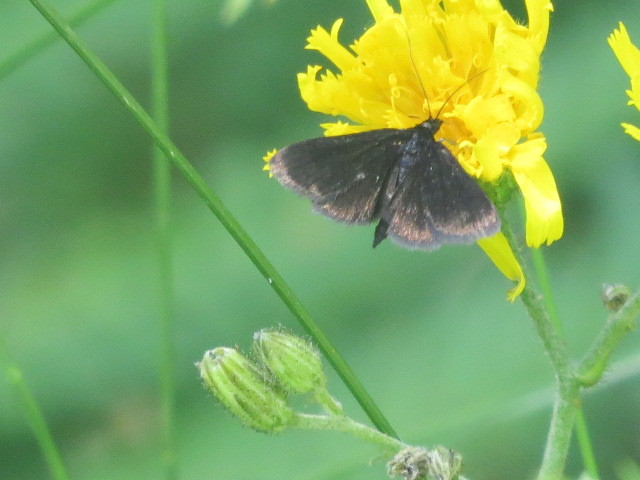

Scientific classification
- Kingdom: Animalia
- Phylum: Arthropoda
- Clade: Pancrustacea
- Class: Insecta
- Order: Lepidoptera
- Family: Crambidae
- Genus: Pyrausta
- Species: P. coracinalis

Binomial name
- Pyrausta coracinalis Leraut, 1982

Synonyms
- Phalaena nigralis Hübner, 1793 (Preocc.); Phalaena nigralis Fabricius, 1794

= Pyrausta coracinalis =

Species of moth

Pyrausta coracinalis is a species of moth in the family Crambidae. It is found in Spain, France, Germany, Austria, Switzerland, Italy, the Czech Republic and most of the Balkan Peninsula (except Greece).

The larvae have been recorded feeding on the flowering plant Salvia pratensis.
