= Udea cyanalis =

Scientific classification
- Kingdom: Animalia
- Phylum: Arthropoda
- Clade: Pancrustacea
- Class: Insecta
- Order: Lepidoptera
- Family: Crambidae
- Genus: Udea
- Species: U. cyanalis

Binomial name
- Udea cyanalis (La Harpe, 1855)

Synonyms
- Botys cyanalis La Harpe, 1855

Species of moth

Udea cyanalis is a species of moth in the family Crambidae described by Jean Jacques Charles de La Harpe in 1855. It is found in Portugal, Spain, France, Germany, Switzerland, Austria, Italy, Bosnia and Herzegovina and Romania. It is also found in Russia (Central Urals, the Caucasus) and Hebei, China.

The wingspan is about 21 mm.
