= Calocucullia celsiae =

Scientific classification
- Kingdom: Animalia
- Phylum: Arthropoda
- Class: Insecta
- Order: Lepidoptera
- Superfamily: Noctuoidea
- Family: Noctuidae
- Genus: Calocucullia
- Species: C. celsiae

Binomial name
- Calocucullia celsiae (Herrich-Schäffer, 1850)

Synonyms
- Cucullia celsiae Herrich-Schäffer, 1850

Species of moth

Calocucullia celsiae is a moth of the family Noctuidae. The species was first described by Gottlieb August Wilhelm Herrich-Schäffer in 1850. It is found from the Balkans to Turkey, northern Iraq, Armenia, Iran, Israel, Jordan and Lebanon.

Adults are on wing from January to April. There is one generation per year.

Larvae have been recorded on Hesperis desertorum in Bulgaria.

== Subspecies ==
- Calocucullia celsiae celsiae
- Calocucullia celsiae levantina (Levant)
