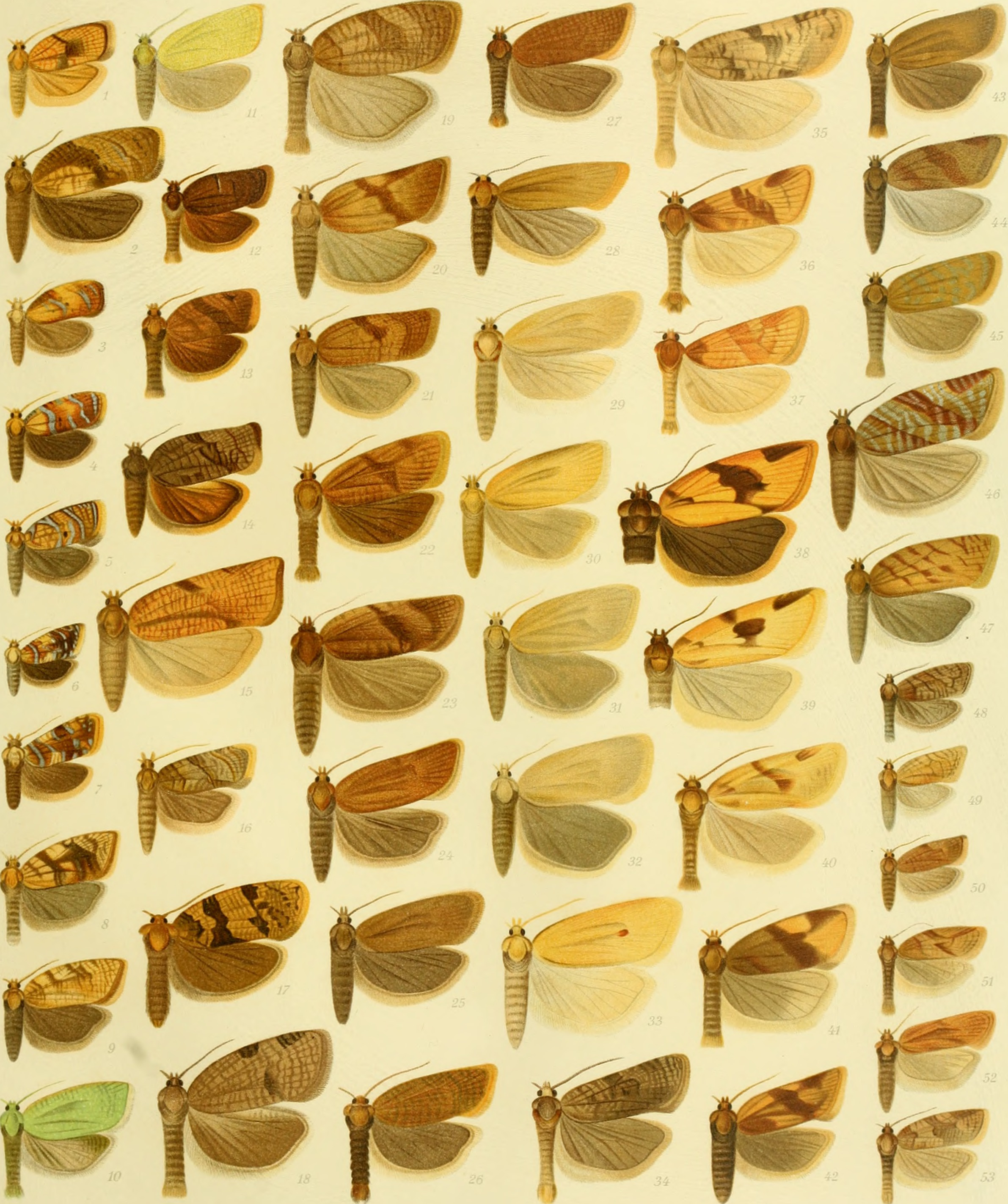
- Clepsis rolandriana in Kennel Die palaearktischen tortriciden figure 47 female

Scientific classification
- Kingdom: Animalia
- Phylum: Arthropoda
- Clade: Pancrustacea
- Class: Insecta
- Order: Lepidoptera
- Family: Tortricidae
- Genus: Clepsis
- Species: C. rolandriana

Binomial name
- Clepsis rolandriana (Linnaeus, 1758)

Synonyms
- Phalaena (Tortrix) rolandriana Linnaeus, 1758

= Clepsis rolandriana =

Species of moth

Clepsis rolandriana is a species of moth of the family Tortricidae. It is found in Germany, Austria, Italy, Slovenia, Bosnia and Herzegovina, Hungary and Russia.

The wingspan is 20–24 mm for males and 18–21 mm for females. Adults have been recorded on wing from June to July.

The larvae feed on Veratrum album. Larvae can be found in May.
