= Scythris crypta =

Scientific classification
- Domain: Eukaryota
- Kingdom: Animalia
- Phylum: Arthropoda
- Class: Insecta
- Order: Lepidoptera
- Family: Scythrididae
- Genus: Scythris
- Species: S. crypta

Binomial name
- Scythris crypta Hannemann, 1961

Species of moth

Scythris crypta is a species of moth belonging to the family Scythrididae.

It is native to Scandinavia.
