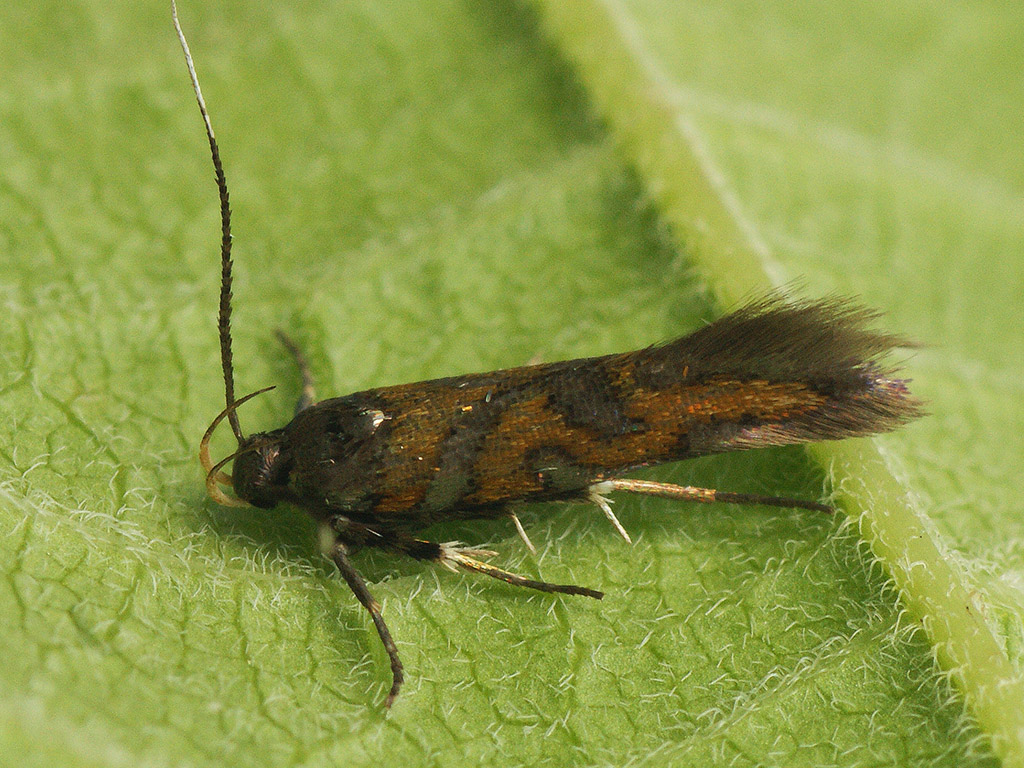

Scientific classification
- Kingdom: Animalia
- Phylum: Arthropoda
- Clade: Pancrustacea
- Class: Insecta
- Order: Lepidoptera
- Family: Gelechiidae
- Genus: Aristotelia
- Species: A. baltica

Binomial name
- Aristotelia baltica A. Sulcs & I. Sulcs, 1983

Synonyms
- Aristotelia coeruleopictella baltica

= Aristotelia baltica =

Species of moth

Aristotelia baltica is a moth of the family Gelechiidae. It is found in Bosnia and Herzegovina, the Baltic region and Russia. The range extends to the Russian Far East.
