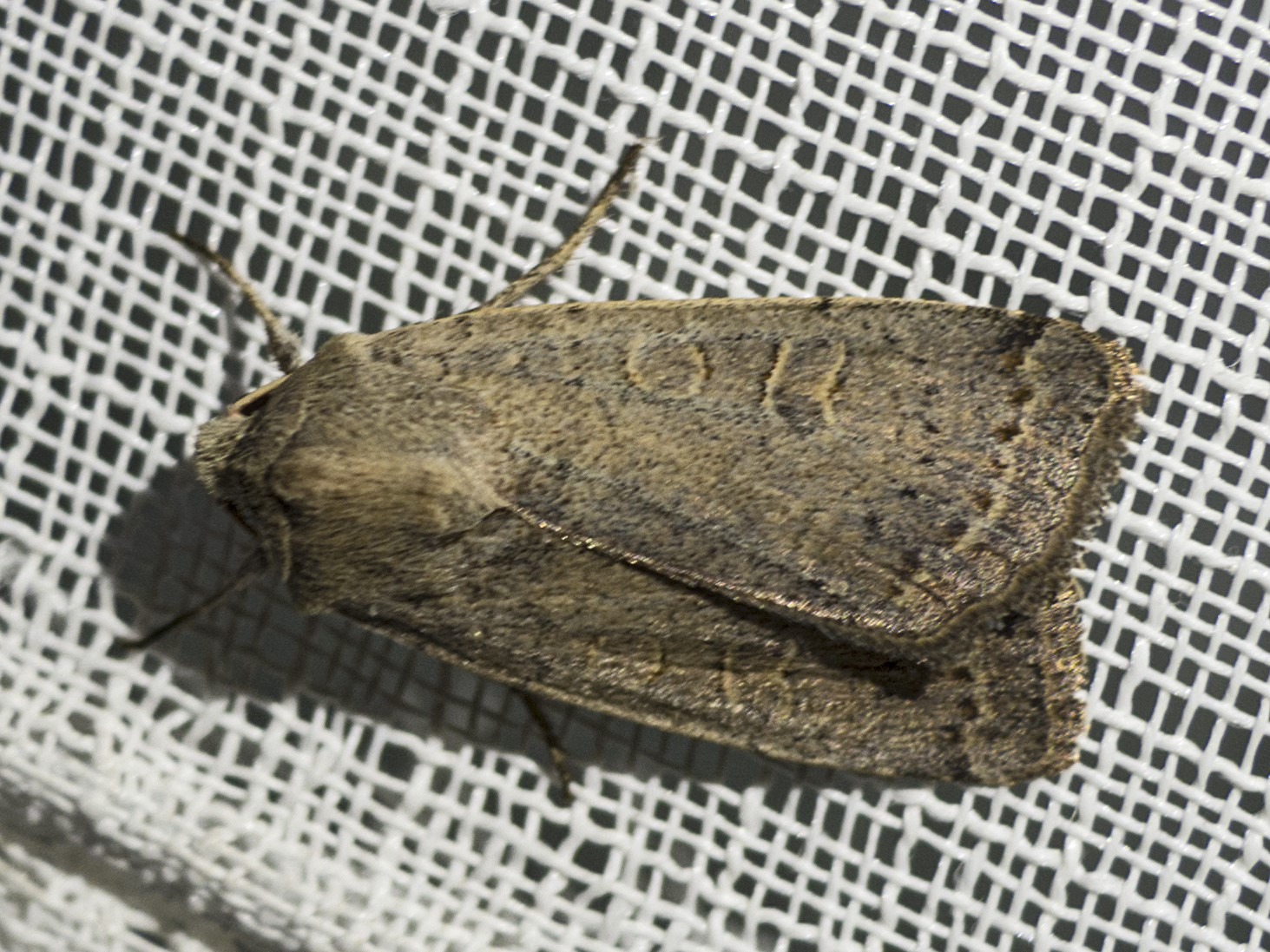

Scientific classification
- Domain: Eukaryota
- Kingdom: Animalia
- Phylum: Arthropoda
- Class: Insecta
- Order: Lepidoptera
- Superfamily: Noctuoidea
- Family: Noctuidae
- Genus: Xestia
- Species: X. cohaesa

Binomial name
- Xestia cohaesa (Herrich-Schäffer, [1849])

Synonyms
- Caradrina cohaesa Herrich-Schäffer, [1849] Lycophotia pulverea Hampson, 1903

= Xestia cohaesa =

Species of moth

Xestia cohaesa is a species of moth in the family Noctuidae. It is found in the eastern part of the Mediterranean basin and in the Near East and Middle East.

Adults are on wing from September to November. There is one generation per year.

The larvae feed on various herbaceous plants, including Poaceae.

== Subspecies ==
- Xestia cohaesa cohaesa (Italy, Greece to Bulgaria, Turkey, Transcaucasia, Lebanon, Israel, Iraq, Iran)
- Xestia cohaesa lineata (Ukraine, Crimea, Caucasus, Turkmenistan)
