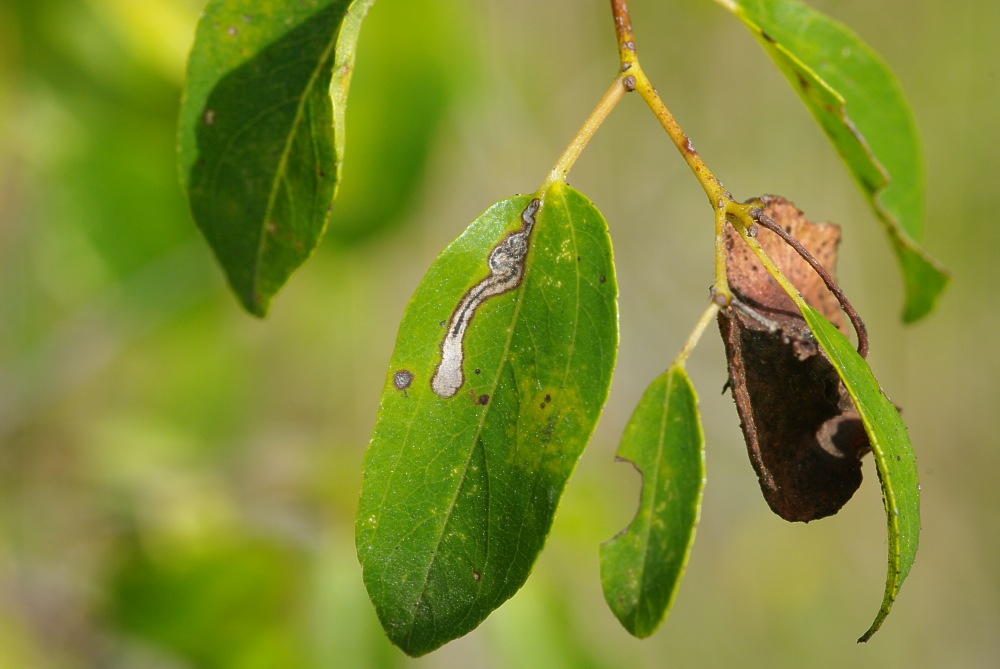

Scientific classification
- Kingdom: Animalia
- Phylum: Arthropoda
- Class: Insecta
- Order: Lepidoptera
- Family: Nepticulidae
- Genus: Stigmella
- Species: S. paliurella

Binomial name
- Stigmella paliurella Gerasimov, 1937

= Stigmella paliurella =

Species of moth

Stigmella paliurella is a moth of the family Nepticulidae. It is found in Italy, the Balkan Peninsula and Ukraine, east to the eastern part of the Palearctic realm. It is also present in the Near East.

There are at least two generations per year.

The larvae feed on Paliurus spina-christi. They mine the leaves of their host plant.
