= Eupithecia variostrigata =

Scientific classification
- Domain: Eukaryota
- Kingdom: Animalia
- Phylum: Arthropoda
- Class: Insecta
- Order: Lepidoptera
- Family: Geometridae
- Genus: Eupithecia
- Species: E. variostrigata

Binomial name
- Eupithecia variostrigata Alphéraky, 1876

Synonyms
- Eupithecia albosparsata de Joannis, 1891; Eupithecia variostrigata f. designata Dietze, 1913; Eupithecia littorata Constant, 1884

Species of moth

Eupithecia variostrigata is a moth in the family Geometridae. It is widespread in the western Palearctic realm, ranging from Spain to the western Pamirs in the east.

== Subspecies ==
- Eupithecia variostrigata variostrigata
- Eupithecia variostrigata artemesiata Constant, 1884
- Eupithecia variostrigata constantina Bethune-Baker, 1885
- Eupithecia variostrigata designata Dietze, 1913
