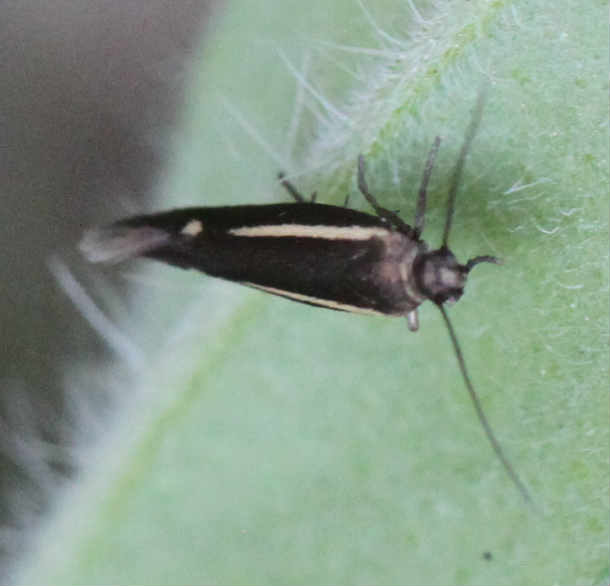

Scientific classification
- Domain: Eukaryota
- Kingdom: Animalia
- Phylum: Arthropoda
- Class: Insecta
- Order: Lepidoptera
- Family: Scythrididae
- Genus: Scythris
- Species: S. knochella

Binomial name
- Scythris knochella (Fabricius, 1794)

= Scythris knochella =

Species of moth

Scythris knochella is a species of moth belonging to the family Scythrididae.

It is native to Western Europe.
