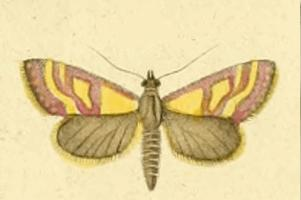

Scientific classification
- Domain: Eukaryota
- Kingdom: Animalia
- Phylum: Arthropoda
- Class: Insecta
- Order: Lepidoptera
- Family: Crambidae
- Genus: Pyrausta
- Species: P. virginalis

Binomial name
- Pyrausta virginalis Duponchel, 1832

Synonyms
- Pyrausta virginalis arianalis Amsel, 1970; Pyrausta neglectalis Caradja, 1916; Pyrausta sanguinalis var. auroralis Zeller, 1847

= Pyrausta virginalis =

Species of moth

Pyrausta virginalis is a species of moth in the family Crambidae. | genus = Pyrausta It is found in southern Europe, Turkey, Armenia and Afghanistan.

The wingspan is about 16 mm.
