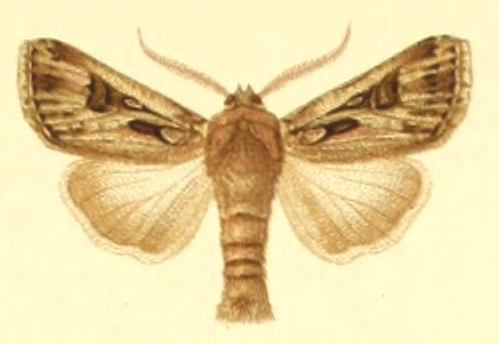

Scientific classification
- Kingdom: Animalia
- Phylum: Arthropoda
- Clade: Pancrustacea
- Class: Insecta
- Order: Lepidoptera
- Superfamily: Noctuoidea
- Family: Noctuidae
- Genus: Agrotis
- Species: A. obesa

Binomial name
- Agrotis obesa Boisduval, 1829

Synonyms
- Agrotis lipara Rambur, 1848; Euxoa obesa; Euxoa scytha

= Agrotis obesa =

Species of moth

Agrotis obesa is a moth of the family Noctuidae. It is found from south-eastern Europe, the Near East and the Middle East to China. In North Africa, it is known from Morocco to Algeria.

Adults are on wing from September to October. There is one generation per year.

The larvae feed on various low-growing herbaceous plants.

== Subspecies ==
- Agrotis obesa obesa (south-western Europe, Morocco, Algeria)
- Agrotis obesa scytha (Greece to south-western Russia, Turkestan, Caucasus, Armenia, Turkey, Syria, Iraq, Iran)
