= Chionodes nebulosella =

Scientific classification
- Kingdom: Animalia
- Phylum: Arthropoda
- Clade: Pancrustacea
- Class: Insecta
- Order: Lepidoptera
- Family: Gelechiidae
- Genus: Chionodes
- Species: C. nebulosella

Binomial name
- Chionodes nebulosella (Heinemann, 1870)

Synonyms
- Gelechia nebulosella Heinemann, 1870

Species of moth

Chionodes nebulosella is a moth of the family Gelechiidae. It is found in France, Germany, Austria, Italy, the Czech Republic, Slovenia, Serbia and Bosnia and Herzegovina.
