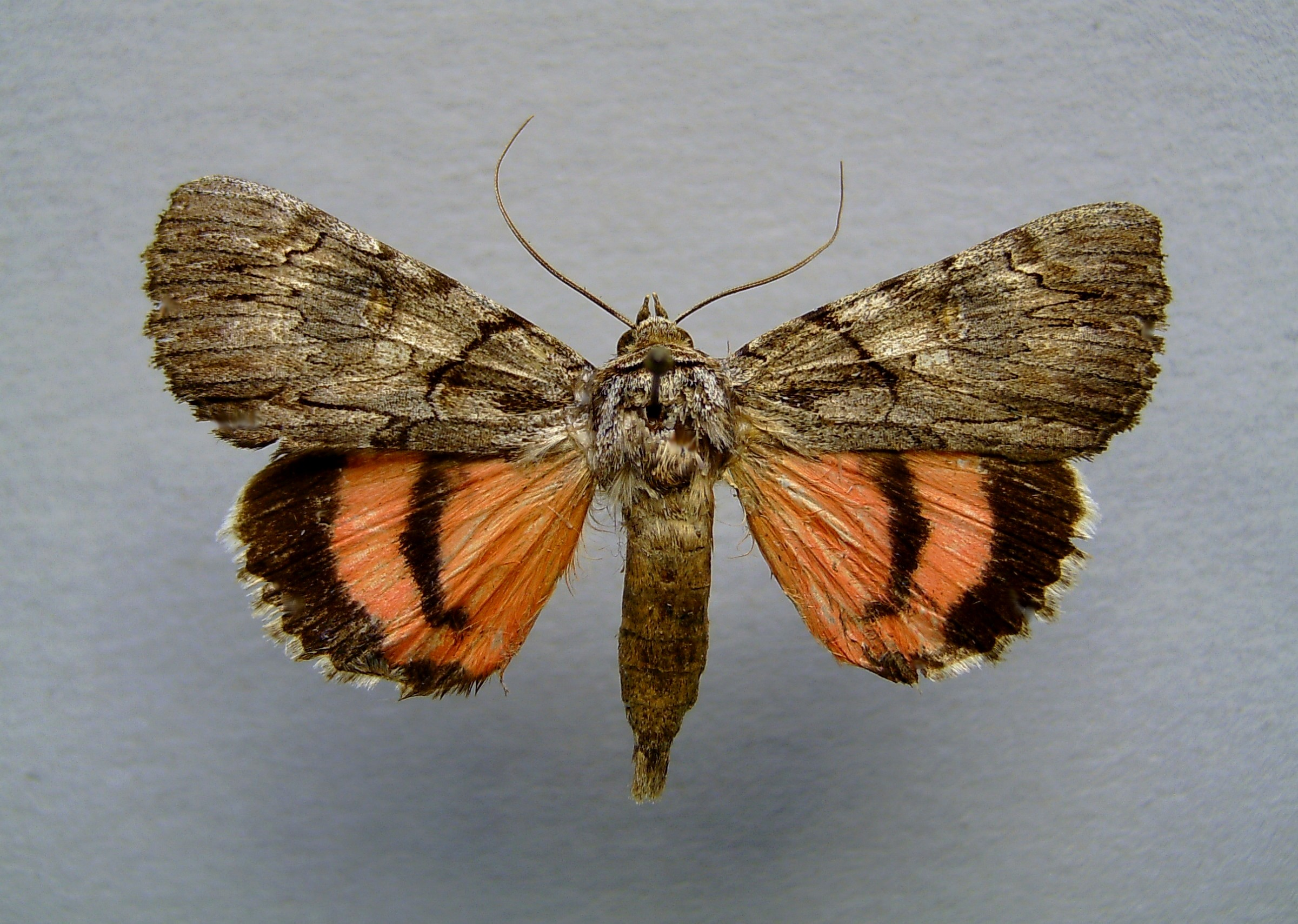

Scientific classification
- Kingdom: Animalia
- Phylum: Arthropoda
- Clade: Pancrustacea
- Class: Insecta
- Order: Lepidoptera
- Superfamily: Noctuoidea
- Family: Erebidae
- Genus: Catocala
- Species: C. lupina

Binomial name
- Catocala lupina Herrich-Schäffer, [1851]

= Catocala lupina =

Species of moth

Catocala lupina is a moth in the family Erebidae first described by Gottlieb August Wilhelm Herrich-Schäffer in 1851. It is found from south-eastern Europe to south-western Siberia, Asia Minor and Transcaucasia.

Adults are on wing from July to early September.

The larvae feed on Salix and Populus species.

== Subspecies ==
- Catocala lupina lupina
- Catocala lupina kastshenkoi Sheljuzhko, 1943 (Transcaucasia)
