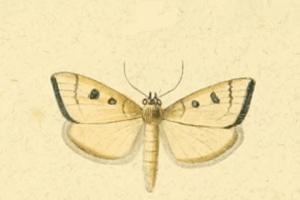

Scientific classification
- Domain: Eukaryota
- Kingdom: Animalia
- Phylum: Arthropoda
- Class: Insecta
- Order: Lepidoptera
- Family: Crambidae
- Genus: Udea
- Species: U. fimbriatralis

Binomial name
- Udea fimbriatralis (Duponchel, 1834)

Synonyms
- Botys fimbriatralis Duponchel, 1834; Botys fimbriatalis Herrich-Schäffer, 1847

= Udea fimbriatralis =

Species of moth

Udea fimbriatralis is a species of moth in the family Crambidae. It is found in Spain, France, Croatia, Bosnia and Herzegovina, Romania, Bulgaria, the Republic of Macedonia, Greece, Turkey and Russia.
