= List of Lepidoptera of Moldova =

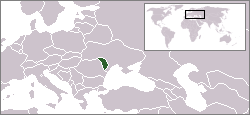
Location of Moldova

The Lepidoptera of Moldova consist of both the butterflies and moths recorded from the Moldova.

== Butterflies ==
=== Hesperiidae ===
- Erynnis tages (Linnaeus, 1758)
- Carcharodus alceae (Esper, 1780)
- Carcharodus lavatherae Esper, 1783
- Carcharodus floccifera (Zeller, 1847)
- Hesperia comma (Linnaeus, 1758)
- Pyrgus carthami (Hübner, [1813])
- Pyrgus sidae (Esper, 1784)
- Pyrgus malvae (Linnaeus, 1758)

=== Lycaenidae ===
- Aricia agestis (Denis & Schiffermüller, 1775)
- Callophrys rubi (Linnaeus, 1758)
- Celastrina argiolus (Linnaeus, 1758)
- Cupido argiades (Pallas, 1771)
- Cupido minimus (Fuessly, 1775)
- Cyaniris semiargus (Rottemburg, 1775)
- Glaucopsyche alexis Poda, 1761
- Lycaena dispar (Haworth, 1802)
- Lycaena phlaeas (Linnaeus, 1761)
- Lysandra bellargus (Rottemburg, 1775)
- Lysandra coridon (Poda, 1761)
- Neozephyrus quercus (Linnaeus, 1758)
- Phengaris arion (Linnaeus, 1758)
- Plebejus argus (Linnaeus, 1758)
- Plebejus argyrognomon (Bergsträsser, 1779)
- Plebejus idas (Linnaeus, 1761)
- Polyommatus amandus (Schneider, 1792)
- Polyommatus daphnis (Denis & Schiffermüller, 1775)
- Polyommatus icarus (Rottemburg, 1775)
- Satyrium acaciae (Fabricius, 1787)
- Satyrium ilicis (Esper, 1779)
- Satyrium pruni (Linnaeus, 1758)
- Satyrium spini (Schiffermüller, 1775)
- Satyrium w-album (Knoch, 1782)
- Thecla betulae (Linnaeus, 1758)
- Tomares nogelii (Herrich-Schäffer, 1851)

=== Nymphalidae ===
- Aglais io (Linnaeus, 1758)
- Aglais urticae (Linnaeus, 1758)
- Apatura ilia ([Denis and Schiffermüller], 1775)
- Apatura metis Freyer, 1829
- Aphantopus hyperantus (Linnaeus, 1758)
- Araschnia levana (Linnaeus, 1758)
- Argynnis pandora Denis & Schiffermüller, 1775
- Argynnis paphia (Linnaeus, 1758)
- Boloria aquilonaris Stichel, 1908
- Boloria dia Linnaeus, 1767
- Coenonympha arcania Linnaeus, 1761
- Coenonympha glycerion Borkhausen, 1788
- Coenonympha pamphilus (Linnaeus, 1758)
- Euphydryas maturna (Linnaeus, 1758)
- Hyponephele lycaon Rottemburg, 1775
- Issoria lathonia (Linnaeus, 1758)
- Lasiommata maera (Linnaeus, 1758)
- Limenitis camilla (Linnaeus, 1764)
- Melanargia galathea (Linnaeus, 1758)
- Melitaea athalia (Rottemburg, 1775)
- Melitaea cinxia (Linnaeus, 1758)
- Melitaea diamina (Lang, 1789)
- Melitaea phoebe Denis & Schiffermüller, 1775
- Minois dryas Scopoli, 1763
- Neptis sappho Pallas, 1771
- Nymphalis polychloros (Linnaeus, 1758)
- Nymphalis xanthomelas (Denis & Schiffermüller, 1775)
- Pararge aegeria (Linnaeus, 1758)
- Polygonia c-album (Linnaeus, 1758)
- Speyeria aglaja (Linnaeus, 1758)
- Vanessa atalanta (Linnaeus, 1758)
- Vanessa cardui (Linnaeus, 1758)

=== Papilionidae ===
- Iphiclides podalirius (Linnaeus, 1758)
- Papilio machaon Linnaeus, 1758
- Parnassius mnemosyne (Linnaeus, 1758)
- Zerynthia polyxena (Denis & Schiffermüller, 1775)

=== Pieridae ===
- Anthocharis cardamines (Linnaeus, 1758)
- Colias chrysotheme Esper, 1781
- Colias croceus (Geoffroy, 1785)
- Colias erate (Esper, 1805)
- Colias hyale (Linnaeus, 1758)
- Euchloe ausonia (Hubner, 1805)
- Leptidea sinapis (Linnaeus, 1758)
- Leptidea morsei (Fenton, 1881)
- Pieris brassicae (Linnaeus, 1758)
- Pontia chloridice (Hübner, 1813)
- Pontia daplidice (Linnaeus, 1758)
- Pieris napi (Linnaeus, 1758)
- Pieris rapae (Linnaeus, 1758)

=== Riodinidae ===
- Hamearis lucina (Linnaeus, 1758)

== Moths ==
=== Adelidae ===
- Adela reaumurella (Linnaeus, 1758)
- Cauchas fibulella (Denis & Schiffermuller, 1775)
- Nematopogon pilella (Denis & Schiffermuller, 1775)

=== Alucitidae ===
- Alucita desmodactyla Zeller, 1847

=== Blastobasidae ===
- Blastobasis phycidella (Zeller, 1839)

=== Chimabachidae ===
- Dasystoma salicella (Hübner, 1796)
- Diurnea fagella (Denis & Schiffermuller, 1775)
- Diurnea lipsiella (Denis & Schiffermuller, 1775)

=== Cosmopterigidae ===
- Cosmopterix zieglerella (Hübner, 1810)
- Eteobalea intermediella (Riedl, 1966)
- Eteobalea tririvella (Staudinger, 1870)
- Limnaecia phragmitella Stainton, 1851
- Pancalia leuwenhoekella (Linnaeus, 1761)
- Pyroderces argyrogrammos (Zeller, 1847)
- Pyroderces caesaris Gozmany, 1957
- Sorhagenia rhamniella (Zeller, 1839)

=== Crambidae ===
- Agriphila inquinatella (Denis & Schiffermuller, 1775)
- Agriphila tristella (Denis & Schiffermuller, 1775)
- Anania fuscalis (Denis & Schiffermuller, 1775)
- Anania hortulata (Linnaeus, 1758)
- Chrysocrambus craterella (Scopoli, 1763)
- Chrysoteuchia culmella (Linnaeus, 1758)
- Crambus lathoniellus (Zincken, 1817)
- Crambus perlella (Scopoli, 1763)
- Crambus pratella (Linnaeus, 1758)
- Ecpyrrhorrhoe rubiginalis (Hübner, 1796)
- Eurrhypis cacuminalis (Eversmann, 1843)
- Evergestis aenealis (Denis & Schiffermuller, 1775)
- Evergestis extimalis (Scopoli, 1763)
- Evergestis forficalis (Linnaeus, 1758)
- Evergestis frumentalis (Linnaeus, 1761)
- Evergestis limbata (Linnaeus, 1767)
- Evergestis pallidata (Hufnagel, 1767)
- Evergestis politalis (Denis & Schiffermuller, 1775)
- Evergestis sophialis (Fabricius, 1787)
- Loxostege sticticalis (Linnaeus, 1761)
- Loxostege virescalis (Guenee, 1854)
- Nomophila noctuella (Denis & Schiffermuller, 1775)
- Nymphula nitidulata (Hufnagel, 1767)
- Ostrinia nubilalis (Hübner, 1796)
- Paratalanta hyalinalis (Hübner, 1796)
- Paratalanta pandalis (Hübner, 1825)
- Pyrausta aurata (Scopoli, 1763)
- Pyrausta despicata (Scopoli, 1763)
- Pyrausta falcatalis Guenee, 1854
- Pyrausta purpuralis (Linnaeus, 1758)
- Udea decrepitalis (Herrich-Schäffer, 1848)
- Udea hamalis (Thunberg, 1788)
- Udea prunalis (Denis & Schiffermuller, 1775)

=== Elachistidae ===
- Agonopterix alstromeriana (Clerck, 1759)
- Agonopterix heracliana (Linnaeus, 1758)
- Agonopterix kaekeritziana (Linnaeus, 1767)
- Agonopterix ocellana (Fabricius, 1775)
- Depressaria albipunctella (Denis & Schiffermuller, 1775)
- Depressaria dictamnella (Treitschke, 1835)
- Semioscopis steinkellneriana (Denis & Schiffermuller, 1775)
- Semioscopis strigulana (Denis & Schiffermuller, 1775)

=== Epermeniidae ===
- Ochromolopis zagulajevi Budashkin & Satshkov, 1991

=== Erebidae ===
- Amata kruegeri (Ragusa, 1904)
- Amata phegea (Linnaeus, 1758)
- Arctia caja (Linnaeus, 1758)
- Arctia festiva (Hufnagel, 1766)
- Arctia villica (Linnaeus, 1758)
- Arytrura musculus (Menetries, 1859)
- Atolmis rubricollis (Linnaeus, 1758)
- Autophila dilucida (Hübner, 1808)
- Callimorpha dominula (Linnaeus, 1758)
- Calymma communimacula (Denis & Schiffermuller, 1775)
- Calyptra thalictri (Borkhausen, 1790)
- Catephia alchymista (Denis & Schiffermuller, 1775)
- Catocala conversa (Esper, 1783)
- Catocala dilecta (Hübner, 1808)
- Catocala disjuncta (Geyer, 1828)
- Catocala diversa (Geyer, 1828)
- Catocala electa (Vieweg, 1790)
- Catocala elocata (Esper, 1787)
- Catocala fraxini (Linnaeus, 1758)
- Catocala fulminea (Scopoli, 1763)
- Catocala hymenaea (Denis & Schiffermuller, 1775)
- Catocala nupta (Linnaeus, 1767)
- Catocala nymphagoga (Esper, 1787)
- Catocala promissa (Denis & Schiffermuller, 1775)
- Catocala puerpera (Giorna, 1791)
- Catocala sponsa (Linnaeus, 1767)
- Colobochyla salicalis (Denis & Schiffermuller, 1775)
- Cybosia mesomella (Linnaeus, 1758)
- Diacrisia sannio (Linnaeus, 1758)
- Diaphora mendica (Clerck, 1759)
- Drasteria cailino (Lefebvre, 1827)
- Dysauxes ancilla (Linnaeus, 1767)
- Dysgonia algira (Linnaeus, 1767)
- Eilema complana (Linnaeus, 1758)
- Eilema depressa (Esper, 1787)
- Eilema griseola (Hübner, 1803)
- Eilema lurideola (Zincken, 1817)
- Eilema lutarella (Linnaeus, 1758)
- Eilema sororcula (Hufnagel, 1766)
- Eublemma amoena (Hübner, 1803)
- Eublemma minutata (Fabricius, 1794)
- Eublemma ostrina (Hübner, 1808)
- Eublemma polygramma (Duponchel, 1842)
- Eublemma purpurina (Denis & Schiffermuller, 1775)
- Euclidia mi (Clerck, 1759)
- Euclidia glyphica (Linnaeus, 1758)
- Euclidia triquetra (Denis & Schiffermuller, 1775)
- Euplagia quadripunctaria (Poda, 1761)
- Euproctis chrysorrhoea (Linnaeus, 1758)
- Euproctis similis (Fuessly, 1775)
- Grammodes stolida (Fabricius, 1775)
- Herminia grisealis (Denis & Schiffermuller, 1775)
- Herminia tarsicrinalis (Knoch, 1782)
- Herminia tarsipennalis (Treitschke, 1835)
- Hypena crassalis (Fabricius, 1787)
- Hypena lividalis (Hübner, 1796)
- Hypena palpalis (Hübner, 1796)
- Hypena proboscidalis (Linnaeus, 1758)
- Hypena rostralis (Linnaeus, 1758)
- Hypenodes humidalis Doubleday, 1850
- Hyphantria cunea (Drury, 1773)
- Hyphoraia aulica (Linnaeus, 1758)
- Idia calvaria (Denis & Schiffermuller, 1775)
- Laspeyria flexula (Denis & Schiffermuller, 1775)
- Lithosia quadra (Linnaeus, 1758)
- Lygephila craccae (Denis & Schiffermuller, 1775)
- Lygephila lusoria (Linnaeus, 1758)
- Lygephila pastinum (Treitschke, 1826)
- Lygephila procax (Hübner, 1813)
- Lygephila viciae (Hübner, 1822)
- Lymantria dispar (Linnaeus, 1758)
- Lymantria monacha (Linnaeus, 1758)
- Macrochilo cribrumalis (Hübner, 1793)
- Miltochrista miniata (Forster, 1771)
- Minucia lunaris (Denis & Schiffermuller, 1775)
- Ocnogyna parasita (Hübner, 1790)
- Orectis proboscidata (Herrich-Schäffer, 1851)
- Orgyia dubia (Tauscher, 1806)
- Paracolax tristalis (Fabricius, 1794)
- Pechipogo plumigeralis Hübner, 1825
- Pechipogo strigilata (Linnaeus, 1758)
- Pericallia matronula (Linnaeus, 1758)
- Phragmatobia fuliginosa (Linnaeus, 1758)
- Phragmatobia luctifera (Denis & Schiffermuller, 1775)
- Phytometra viridaria (Clerck, 1759)
- Polypogon gryphalis (Herrich-Schäffer, 1851)
- Polypogon tentacularia (Linnaeus, 1758)
- Raparna conicephala (Staudinger, 1870)
- Rhyparia purpurata (Linnaeus, 1758)
- Rivula sericealis (Scopoli, 1763)
- Schrankia costaestrigalis (Stephens, 1834)
- Schrankia taenialis (Hübner, 1809)
- Scoliopteryx libatrix (Linnaeus, 1758)
- Simplicia rectalis (Eversmann, 1842)
- Spilosoma lubricipeda (Linnaeus, 1758)
- Spilosoma lutea (Hufnagel, 1766)
- Spilosoma urticae (Esper, 1789)
- Trisateles emortualis (Denis & Schiffermuller, 1775)
- Tyria jacobaeae (Linnaeus, 1758)
- Utetheisa pulchella (Linnaeus, 1758)
- Zanclognatha lunalis (Scopoli, 1763)
- Zanclognatha zelleralis (Wocke, 1850)
- Zekelita antiqualis (Hübner, 1809)

=== Euteliidae ===
- Eutelia adulatrix (Hübner, 1813)

=== Gelechiidae ===
- Neofriseria kuznetzovae Bidzilya, 2002

=== Geometridae ===
- Alsophila aceraria (Denis & Schiffermuller, 1775)
- Alsophila aescularia (Denis & Schiffermuller, 1775)
- Anticlea derivata (Denis & Schiffermuller, 1775)
- Aplocera plagiata (Linnaeus, 1758)
- Asthena albulata (Hufnagel, 1767)
- Asthena anseraria (Herrich-Schäffer, 1855)
- Boudinotiana puella (Esper, 1787)
- Camptogramma bilineata (Linnaeus, 1758)
- Cataclysme riguata (Hübner, 1813)
- Catarhoe cuculata (Hufnagel, 1767)
- Catarhoe rubidata (Denis & Schiffermuller, 1775)
- Chlorissa viridata (Linnaeus, 1758)
- Chloroclysta siterata (Hufnagel, 1767)
- Cidaria fulvata (Forster, 1771)
- Coenocalpe lapidata (Hübner, 1809)
- Colostygia pectinataria (Knoch, 1781)
- Comibaena bajularia (Denis & Schiffermuller, 1775)
- Cosmorhoe ocellata (Linnaeus, 1758)
- Costaconvexa polygrammata (Borkhausen, 1794)
- Cyclophora punctaria (Linnaeus, 1758)
- Cyclophora annularia (Fabricius, 1775)
- Dysstroma citrata (Linnaeus, 1761)
- Earophila badiata (Denis & Schiffermuller, 1775)
- Electrophaes corylata (Thunberg, 1792)
- Epirrhoe galiata (Denis & Schiffermuller, 1775)
- Epirrhoe molluginata (Hübner, 1813)
- Epirrhoe rivata (Hübner, 1813)
- Epirrhoe tristata (Linnaeus, 1758)
- Epirrita dilutata (Denis & Schiffermuller, 1775)
- Euphyia biangulata (Haworth, 1809)
- Euphyia unangulata (Haworth, 1809)
- Gandaritis pyraliata (Denis & Schiffermuller, 1775)
- Horisme tersata (Denis & Schiffermuller, 1775)
- Horisme vitalbata (Denis & Schiffermuller, 1775)
- Hydrelia flammeolaria (Hufnagel, 1767)
- Hydria undulata (Linnaeus, 1758)
- Idaea degeneraria (Hübner, 1799)
- Idaea politaria (Hübner, 1799)
- Idaea seriata (Schrank, 1802)
- Lithostege coassata (Hübner, 1825)
- Lithostege farinata (Hufnagel, 1767)
- Lithostege griseata (Denis & Schiffermuller, 1775)
- Lobophora halterata (Hufnagel, 1767)
- Lythria cruentaria (Hufnagel, 1767)
- Lythria purpuraria (Linnaeus, 1758)
- Melanthia procellata (Denis & Schiffermuller, 1775)
- Mesoleuca albicillata (Linnaeus, 1758)
- Minoa murinata (Scopoli, 1763)
- Nothocasis sertata (Hübner, 1817)
- Nycterosea obstipata (Fabricius, 1794)
- Odezia atrata (Linnaeus, 1758)
- Operophtera brumata (Linnaeus, 1758)
- Pelurga comitata (Linnaeus, 1758)
- Phibalapteryx virgata (Hufnagel, 1767)
- Philereme transversata (Hufnagel, 1767)
- Philereme vetulata (Denis & Schiffermuller, 1775)
- Plemyria rubiginata (Denis & Schiffermuller, 1775)
- Rhodostrophia vibicaria (Clerck, 1759)
- Schistostege nubilaria (Hübner, 1799)
- Scopula marginepunctata (Goeze, 1781)
- Scopula ornata (Scopoli, 1763)
- Scopula tessellaria (Boisduval, 1840)
- Scotopteryx bipunctaria (Denis & Schiffermuller, 1775)
- Scotopteryx chenopodiata (Linnaeus, 1758)
- Scotopteryx moeniata (Scopoli, 1763)
- Scotopteryx mucronata (Scopoli, 1763)
- Thalera fimbrialis (Scopoli, 1763)
- Thera variata (Denis & Schiffermuller, 1775)
- Thetidia smaragdaria (Fabricius, 1787)
- Timandra comae Schmidt, 1931
- Trichopteryx polycommata (Denis & Schiffermuller, 1775)
- Xanthorhoe designata (Hufnagel, 1767)
- Xanthorhoe ferrugata (Clerck, 1759)
- Xanthorhoe fluctuata (Linnaeus, 1758)
- Xanthorhoe montanata (Denis & Schiffermuller, 1775)
- Xanthorhoe quadrifasiata (Clerck, 1759)
- Xanthorhoe spadicearia (Denis & Schiffermuller, 1775)

=== Gracillariidae ===
- Callisto denticulella (Thunberg, 1794)
- Caloptilia fidella (Reutti, 1853)
- Caloptilia roscipennella (Hübner, 1796)
- Calybites phasianipennella (Hübner, 1813)
- Gracillaria syringella (Fabricius, 1794)
- Parectopa ononidis (Zeller, 1839)
- Parornix anguliferella (Zeller, 1847)
- Parornix devoniella (Stainton, 1850)
- Parornix finitimella (Zeller, 1850)
- Parornix petiolella (Frey, 1863)
- Parornix scoticella (Stainton, 1850)
- Parornix torquillella (Zeller, 1850)
- Phyllonorycter acaciella (Duponchel, 1843)
- Phyllonorycter acerifoliella (Zeller, 1839)
- Phyllonorycter blancardella (Fabricius, 1781)
- Phyllonorycter cerasicolella (Herrich-Schäffer, 1855)
- Phyllonorycter coryli (Nicelli, 1851)
- Phyllonorycter corylifoliella (Hübner, 1796)
- Phyllonorycter emberizaepenella (Bouche, 1834)
- Phyllonorycter fraxinella (Zeller, 1846)
- Phyllonorycter harrisella (Linnaeus, 1761)
- Phyllonorycter insignitella (Zeller, 1846)
- Phyllonorycter joannisi (Le Marchand, 1936)
- Phyllonorycter klemannella (Fabricius, 1781)
- Phyllonorycter messaniella (Zeller, 1846)
- Phyllonorycter muelleriella (Zeller, 1839)
- Phyllonorycter nicellii (Stainton, 1851)
- Phyllonorycter oxyacanthae (Frey, 1856)
- Phyllonorycter populifoliella (Treitschke, 1833)
- Phyllonorycter pyrifoliella (Gerasimov, 1933)
- Phyllonorycter quercifoliella (Zeller, 1839)
- Phyllonorycter rajella (Linnaeus, 1758)
- Phyllonorycter salictella (Zeller, 1846)
- Phyllonorycter sorbi (Frey, 1855)
- Phyllonorycter spinicolella (Zeller, 1846)
- Phyllonorycter tristrigella (Haworth, 1828)
- Sauterina hofmanniella (Schleich, 1867)

=== Lecithoceridae ===
- Lecithocera nigrana (Duponchel, 1836)
- Odites kollarella (O. G. Costa, 1832)

=== Momphidae ===
- Mompha subbistrigella (Haworth, 1828)

=== Nepticulidae ===
- Ectoedemia agrimoniae (Frey, 1858)
- Ectoedemia arcuatella (Herrich-Schäffer, 1855)
- Ectoedemia atricollis (Stainton, 1857)
- Ectoedemia caradjai (Groschke, 1944)
- Ectoedemia heringi (Toll, 1934)
- Ectoedemia subbimaculella (Haworth, 1828)
- Simplimorpha promissa (Staudinger, 1871)
- Stigmella anomalella (Goeze, 1783)
- Stigmella aurella (Fabricius, 1775)
- Stigmella basiguttella (Heinemann, 1862)
- Stigmella desperatella (Frey, 1856)
- Stigmella freyella (Heyden, 1858)
- Stigmella hybnerella (Hübner, 1796)
- Stigmella lemniscella (Zeller, 1839)
- Stigmella minusculella (Herrich-Schäffer, 1855)
- Stigmella paradoxa (Frey, 1858)
- Stigmella plagicolella (Stainton, 1854)
- Stigmella prunetorum (Stainton, 1855)
- Stigmella rhamnella (Herrich-Schäffer, 1860)
- Stigmella ulmivora (Fologne, 1860)

=== Noctuidae ===
- Abrostola tripartita (Hufnagel, 1766)
- Abrostola triplasia (Linnaeus, 1758)
- Acontia lucida (Hufnagel, 1766)
- Acontia trabealis (Scopoli, 1763)
- Acontia melanura (Tauscher, 1809)
- Acontia titania (Esper, 1798)
- Acronicta aceris (Linnaeus, 1758)
- Acronicta leporina (Linnaeus, 1758)
- Acronicta strigosa (Denis & Schiffermuller, 1775)
- Acronicta alni (Linnaeus, 1767)
- Acronicta cuspis (Hübner, 1813)
- Acronicta psi (Linnaeus, 1758)
- Acronicta tridens (Denis & Schiffermuller, 1775)
- Acronicta auricoma (Denis & Schiffermuller, 1775)
- Acronicta cinerea (Hufnagel, 1766)
- Acronicta euphorbiae (Denis & Schiffermuller, 1775)
- Acronicta menyanthidis (Esper, 1789)
- Acronicta rumicis (Linnaeus, 1758)
- Actinotia polyodon (Clerck, 1759)
- Aedia funesta (Esper, 1786)
- Aegle kaekeritziana (Hübner, 1799)
- Agrochola lychnidis (Denis & Schiffermuller, 1775)
- Agrochola helvola (Linnaeus, 1758)
- Agrochola humilis (Denis & Schiffermuller, 1775)
- Agrochola litura (Linnaeus, 1758)
- Agrochola nitida (Denis & Schiffermuller, 1775)
- Agrochola lota (Clerck, 1759)
- Agrochola macilenta (Hübner, 1809)
- Agrochola laevis (Hübner, 1803)
- Agrochola circellaris (Hufnagel, 1766)
- Agrotis bigramma (Esper, 1790)
- Agrotis cinerea (Denis & Schiffermuller, 1775)
- Agrotis clavis (Hufnagel, 1766)
- Agrotis desertorum Boisduval, 1840
- Agrotis exclamationis (Linnaeus, 1758)
- Agrotis ipsilon (Hufnagel, 1766)
- Agrotis obesa Boisduval, 1829
- Agrotis segetum (Denis & Schiffermuller, 1775)
- Agrotis trux (Hübner, 1824)
- Allophyes oxyacanthae (Linnaeus, 1758)
- Ammoconia caecimacula (Denis & Schiffermuller, 1775)
- Amphipoea fucosa (Freyer, 1830)
- Amphipoea oculea (Linnaeus, 1761)
- Amphipyra berbera Rungs, 1949
- Amphipyra livida (Denis & Schiffermuller, 1775)
- Amphipyra perflua (Fabricius, 1787)
- Amphipyra pyramidea (Linnaeus, 1758)
- Amphipyra tetra (Fabricius, 1787)
- Amphipyra tragopoginis (Clerck, 1759)
- Anarta myrtilli (Linnaeus, 1761)
- Anarta odontites (Boisduval, 1829)
- Anarta stigmosa (Christoph, 1887)
- Anarta trifolii (Hufnagel, 1766)
- Anorthoa munda (Denis & Schiffermuller, 1775)
- Antitype chi (Linnaeus, 1758)
- Apamea anceps (Denis & Schiffermuller, 1775)
- Apamea crenata (Hufnagel, 1766)
- Apamea epomidion (Haworth, 1809)
- Apamea furva (Denis & Schiffermuller, 1775)
- Apamea illyria Freyer, 1846
- Apamea lateritia (Hufnagel, 1766)
- Apamea lithoxylaea (Denis & Schiffermuller, 1775)
- Apamea monoglypha (Hufnagel, 1766)
- Apamea oblonga (Haworth, 1809)
- Apamea remissa (Hübner, 1809)
- Apamea scolopacina (Esper, 1788)
- Apamea sordens (Hufnagel, 1766)
- Apamea sublustris (Esper, 1788)
- Apamea unanimis (Hübner, 1813)
- Aporophyla lutulenta (Denis & Schiffermuller, 1775)
- Apterogenum ypsillon (Denis & Schiffermuller, 1775)
- Asteroscopus sphinx (Hufnagel, 1766)
- Atethmia ambusta (Denis & Schiffermuller, 1775)
- Atethmia centrago (Haworth, 1809)
- Athetis furvula (Hübner, 1808)
- Athetis pallustris (Hübner, 1808)
- Autographa bractea (Denis & Schiffermuller, 1775)
- Autographa buraetica (Staudinger, 1892)
- Autographa gamma (Linnaeus, 1758)
- Autographa jota (Linnaeus, 1758)
- Autographa pulchrina (Haworth, 1809)
- Axylia putris (Linnaeus, 1761)
- Brachionycha nubeculosa (Esper, 1785)
- Brachylomia viminalis (Fabricius, 1776)
- Bryophila orthogramma (Boursin, 1954)
- Bryophila raptricula (Denis & Schiffermuller, 1775)
- Bryophila ravula (Hübner, 1813)
- Bryophila seladona Christoph, 1885
- Bryophila domestica (Hufnagel, 1766)
- Calamia tridens (Hufnagel, 1766)
- Calophasia lunula (Hufnagel, 1766)
- Calophasia platyptera (Esper, 1788)
- Caradrina morpheus (Hufnagel, 1766)
- Caradrina clavipalpis Scopoli, 1763
- Cardepia hartigi Parenzan, 1981
- Ceramica pisi (Linnaeus, 1758)
- Cerapteryx graminis (Linnaeus, 1758)
- Cerastis rubricosa (Denis & Schiffermuller, 1775)
- Charanyca ferruginea (Esper, 1785)
- Chersotis cuprea (Denis & Schiffermuller, 1775)
- Chilodes maritima (Tauscher, 1806)
- Chloantha hyperici (Denis & Schiffermuller, 1775)
- Chrysodeixis chalcites (Esper, 1789)
- Colocasia coryli (Linnaeus, 1758)
- Conisania cervina (Eversmann, 1842)
- Conisania leineri (Freyer, 1836)
- Conisania luteago (Denis & Schiffermuller, 1775)
- Conistra ligula (Esper, 1791)
- Conistra rubiginosa (Scopoli, 1763)
- Conistra vaccinii (Linnaeus, 1761)
- Conistra veronicae (Hübner, 1813)
- Conistra erythrocephala (Denis & Schiffermuller, 1775)
- Conistra rubiginea (Denis & Schiffermuller, 1775)
- Cosmia trapezina (Linnaeus, 1758)
- Cosmia diffinis (Linnaeus, 1767)
- Cosmia pyralina (Denis & Schiffermuller, 1775)
- Cosmia affinis (Linnaeus, 1767)
- Craniophora ligustri (Denis & Schiffermuller, 1775)
- Craniophora pontica (Staudinger, 1878)
- Cryphia fraudatricula (Hübner, 1803)
- Cryphia receptricula (Hübner, 1803)
- Cryphia algae (Fabricius, 1775)
- Cucullia absinthii (Linnaeus, 1761)
- Cucullia artemisiae (Hufnagel, 1766)
- Cucullia asteris (Denis & Schiffermuller, 1775)
- Cucullia biornata Fischer von Waldheim, 1840
- Cucullia chamomillae (Denis & Schiffermuller, 1775)
- Cucullia fraudatrix Eversmann, 1837
- Cucullia lactucae (Denis & Schiffermuller, 1775)
- Cucullia lucifuga (Denis & Schiffermuller, 1775)
- Cucullia tanaceti (Denis & Schiffermuller, 1775)
- Cucullia umbratica (Linnaeus, 1758)
- Cucullia xeranthemi Boisduval, 1840
- Cucullia lanceolata (Villers, 1789)
- Cucullia lychnitis Rambur, 1833
- Cucullia prenanthis Boisduval, 1840
- Cucullia scrophulariae (Denis & Schiffermuller, 1775)
- Cucullia verbasci (Linnaeus, 1758)
- Deltote bankiana (Fabricius, 1775)
- Deltote deceptoria (Scopoli, 1763)
- Deltote uncula (Clerck, 1759)
- Deltote pygarga (Hufnagel, 1766)
- Diachrysia chrysitis (Linnaeus, 1758)
- Diachrysia chryson (Esper, 1789)
- Diachrysia stenochrysis (Warren, 1913)
- Diachrysia zosimi (Hübner, 1822)
- Diarsia brunnea (Denis & Schiffermuller, 1775)
- Diarsia florida (F. Schmidt, 1859)
- Diarsia mendica (Fabricius, 1775)
- Diarsia rubi (Vieweg, 1790)
- Dichagyris flammatra (Denis & Schiffermuller, 1775)
- Dichagyris candelisequa (Denis & Schiffermuller, 1775)
- Dichagyris forcipula (Denis & Schiffermuller, 1775)
- Dichagyris renigera (Hübner, 1808)
- Dichagyris signifera (Denis & Schiffermuller, 1775)
- Dichonia convergens (Denis & Schiffermuller, 1775)
- Dicycla oo (Linnaeus, 1758)
- Diloba caeruleocephala (Linnaeus, 1758)
- Dryobotodes eremita (Fabricius, 1775)
- Egira conspicillaris (Linnaeus, 1758)
- Elaphria venustula (Hübner, 1790)
- Enargia paleacea (Esper, 1788)
- Eogena contaminei (Eversmann, 1847)
- Epilecta linogrisea (Denis & Schiffermuller, 1775)
- Episema glaucina (Esper, 1789)
- Episema korsakovi (Christoph, 1885)
- Episema tersa (Denis & Schiffermuller, 1775)
- Eremobia ochroleuca (Denis & Schiffermuller, 1775)
- Eremohadena immunda (Eversmann, 1842)
- Eugraphe sigma (Denis & Schiffermuller, 1775)
- Euplexia lucipara (Linnaeus, 1758)
- Eupsilia transversa (Hufnagel, 1766)
- Euxoa aquilina (Denis & Schiffermuller, 1775)
- Euxoa basigramma (Staudinger, 1870)
- Euxoa diaphora Boursin, 1928
- Euxoa distinguenda (Lederer, 1857)
- Euxoa nigricans (Linnaeus, 1761)
- Euxoa obelisca (Denis & Schiffermuller, 1775)
- Euxoa ochrogaster (Guenee, 1852)
- Euxoa vitta (Esper, 1789)
- Globia algae (Esper, 1789)
- Globia sparganii (Esper, 1790)
- Graphiphora augur (Fabricius, 1775)
- Griposia aprilina (Linnaeus, 1758)
- Hada plebeja (Linnaeus, 1761)
- Hadena irregularis (Hufnagel, 1766)
- Hadena perplexa (Denis & Schiffermuller, 1775)
- Hadena silenes (Hübner, 1822)
- Hadena syriaca (Osthelder, 1933)
- Hadena albimacula (Borkhausen, 1792)
- Hadena compta (Denis & Schiffermuller, 1775)
- Hadena confusa (Hufnagel, 1766)
- Hadena filograna (Esper, 1788)
- Hadena magnolii (Boisduval, 1829)
- Hadena tephroleuca (Boisduval, 1833)
- Hecatera bicolorata (Hufnagel, 1766)
- Hecatera cappa (Hübner, 1809)
- Hecatera dysodea (Denis & Schiffermuller, 1775)
- Helicoverpa armigera (Hübner, 1808)
- Heliothis adaucta Butler, 1878
- Heliothis incarnata Freyer, 1838
- Heliothis maritima Graslin, 1855
- Heliothis peltigera (Denis & Schiffermuller, 1775)
- Heliothis viriplaca (Hufnagel, 1766)
- Helotropha leucostigma (Hübner, 1808)
- Hillia iris (Zetterstedt, 1839)
- Hoplodrina ambigua (Denis & Schiffermuller, 1775)
- Hoplodrina blanda (Denis & Schiffermuller, 1775)
- Hoplodrina octogenaria (Goeze, 1781)
- Hydraecia micacea (Esper, 1789)
- Ipimorpha retusa (Linnaeus, 1761)
- Ipimorpha subtusa (Denis & Schiffermuller, 1775)
- Jodia croceago (Denis & Schiffermuller, 1775)
- Lacanobia contigua (Denis & Schiffermuller, 1775)
- Lacanobia suasa (Denis & Schiffermuller, 1775)
- Lacanobia thalassina (Hufnagel, 1766)
- Lacanobia aliena (Hübner, 1809)
- Lacanobia blenna (Hübner, 1824)
- Lacanobia oleracea (Linnaeus, 1758)
- Lacanobia praedita (Hübner, 1813)
- Lacanobia splendens (Hübner, 1808)
- Lacanobia w-latinum (Hufnagel, 1766)
- Lasionycta proxima (Hübner, 1809)
- Lateroligia ophiogramma (Esper, 1794)
- Lenisa geminipuncta (Haworth, 1809)
- Leucania comma (Linnaeus, 1761)
- Leucania obsoleta (Hübner, 1803)
- Leucania zeae (Duponchel, 1827)
- Lithophane consocia (Borkhausen, 1792)
- Lithophane furcifera (Hufnagel, 1766)
- Lithophane lamda (Fabricius, 1787)
- Lithophane ornitopus (Hufnagel, 1766)
- Lithophane socia (Hufnagel, 1766)
- Litoligia literosa (Haworth, 1809)
- Luperina testacea (Denis & Schiffermuller, 1775)
- Macdunnoughia confusa (Stephens, 1850)
- Mamestra brassicae (Linnaeus, 1758)
- Meganephria bimaculosa (Linnaeus, 1767)
- Melanchra persicariae (Linnaeus, 1761)
- Mesapamea secalis (Linnaeus, 1758)
- Mesogona oxalina (Hübner, 1803)
- Mesoligia furuncula (Denis & Schiffermuller, 1775)
- Mniotype adusta (Esper, 1790)
- Mniotype satura (Denis & Schiffermuller, 1775)
- Moma alpium (Osbeck, 1778)
- Mormo maura (Linnaeus, 1758)
- Mycteroplus puniceago (Boisduval, 1840)
- Mythimna albipuncta (Denis & Schiffermuller, 1775)
- Mythimna ferrago (Fabricius, 1787)
- Mythimna l-album (Linnaeus, 1767)
- Mythimna conigera (Denis & Schiffermuller, 1775)
- Mythimna impura (Hübner, 1808)
- Mythimna pallens (Linnaeus, 1758)
- Mythimna pudorina (Denis & Schiffermuller, 1775)
- Mythimna straminea (Treitschke, 1825)
- Mythimna turca (Linnaeus, 1761)
- Mythimna vitellina (Hübner, 1808)
- Mythimna unipuncta (Haworth, 1809)
- Mythimna alopecuri (Boisduval, 1840)
- Mythimna andereggii (Boisduval, 1840)
- Mythimna sicula (Treitschke, 1835)
- Naenia typica (Linnaeus, 1758)
- Noctua comes Hübner, 1813
- Noctua interposita (Hübner, 1790)
- Noctua janthina Denis & Schiffermuller, 1775
- Noctua orbona (Hufnagel, 1766)
- Noctua pronuba (Linnaeus, 1758)
- Nonagria typhae (Thunberg, 1784)
- Nyctobrya muralis (Forster, 1771)
- Ochropleura leucogaster (Freyer, 1831)
- Ochropleura plecta (Linnaeus, 1761)
- Oligia latruncula (Denis & Schiffermuller, 1775)
- Oligia strigilis (Linnaeus, 1758)
- Oligia versicolor (Borkhausen, 1792)
- Omphalophana antirrhinii (Hübner, 1803)
- Orbona fragariae Vieweg, 1790
- Orthosia gracilis (Denis & Schiffermuller, 1775)
- Orthosia opima (Hübner, 1809)
- Orthosia cerasi (Fabricius, 1775)
- Orthosia cruda (Denis & Schiffermuller, 1775)
- Orthosia miniosa (Denis & Schiffermuller, 1775)
- Orthosia populeti (Fabricius, 1775)
- Orthosia incerta (Hufnagel, 1766)
- Orthosia gothica (Linnaeus, 1758)
- Oxicesta geographica (Fabricius, 1787)
- Pachetra sagittigera (Hufnagel, 1766)
- Panemeria tenebrata (Scopoli, 1763)
- Panolis flammea (Denis & Schiffermuller, 1775)
- Papestra biren (Goeze, 1781)
- Parastichtis suspecta (Hübner, 1817)
- Peridroma saucia (Hübner, 1808)
- Periphanes delphinii (Linnaeus, 1758)
- Phlogophora meticulosa (Linnaeus, 1758)
- Phragmatiphila nexa (Hübner, 1808)
- Phyllophila obliterata (Rambur, 1833)
- Plusia festucae (Linnaeus, 1758)
- Plusia putnami (Grote, 1873)
- Polia bombycina (Hufnagel, 1766)
- Polia hepatica (Clerck, 1759)
- Polia nebulosa (Hufnagel, 1766)
- Polychrysia moneta (Fabricius, 1787)
- Polymixis polymita (Linnaeus, 1761)
- Polyphaenis sericata (Esper, 1787)
- Protoschinia scutosa (Denis & Schiffermuller, 1775)
- Pseudeustrotia candidula (Denis & Schiffermuller, 1775)
- Pyrrhia umbra (Hufnagel, 1766)
- Rhizedra lutosa (Hübner, 1803)
- Rhyacia simulans (Hufnagel, 1766)
- Saragossa porosa (Eversmann, 1854)
- Saragossa siccanorum (Staudinger, 1870)
- Scotochrosta pulla (Denis & Schiffermuller, 1775)
- Senta flammea (Curtis, 1828)
- Sideridis rivularis (Fabricius, 1775)
- Sideridis reticulata (Goeze, 1781)
- Sideridis egena (Lederer, 1853)
- Sideridis turbida (Esper, 1790)
- Simyra albovenosa (Goeze, 1781)
- Simyra dentinosa Freyer, 1838
- Simyra nervosa (Denis & Schiffermuller, 1775)
- Spaelotis ravida (Denis & Schiffermuller, 1775)
- Spodoptera exigua (Hübner, 1808)
- Subacronicta megacephala (Denis & Schiffermuller, 1775)
- Thalpophila matura (Hufnagel, 1766)
- Tholera cespitis (Denis & Schiffermuller, 1775)
- Tholera decimalis (Poda, 1761)
- Tiliacea aurago (Denis & Schiffermuller, 1775)
- Tiliacea citrago (Linnaeus, 1758)
- Tiliacea sulphurago (Denis & Schiffermuller, 1775)
- Trachea atriplicis (Linnaeus, 1758)
- Tyta luctuosa (Denis & Schiffermuller, 1775)
- Ulochlaena hirta (Hübner, 1813)
- Valeria oleagina (Denis & Schiffermuller, 1775)
- Victrix umovii (Eversmann, 1846)
- Xanthia gilvago (Denis & Schiffermuller, 1775)
- Xanthia icteritia (Hufnagel, 1766)
- Xanthia ocellaris (Borkhausen, 1792)
- Xanthia castanea Osthelder, 1933
- Xanthia togata (Esper, 1788)
- Xestia c-nigrum (Linnaeus, 1758)
- Xestia triangulum (Hufnagel, 1766)
- Xestia baja (Denis & Schiffermuller, 1775)
- Xestia stigmatica (Hübner, 1813)
- Xestia xanthographa (Denis & Schiffermuller, 1775)
- Xylena exsoleta (Linnaeus, 1758)
- Xylena vetusta (Hübner, 1813)

=== Nolidae ===
- Bena bicolorana (Fuessly, 1775)
- Earias clorana (Linnaeus, 1761)
- Earias vernana (Fabricius, 1787)
- Meganola albula (Denis & Schiffermuller, 1775)
- Meganola strigula (Denis & Schiffermuller, 1775)
- Meganola togatulalis (Hübner, 1796)
- Nola aerugula (Hübner, 1793)
- Nola confusalis (Herrich-Schäffer, 1847)
- Nola cucullatella (Linnaeus, 1758)
- Nycteola asiatica (Krulikovsky, 1904)
- Nycteola revayana (Scopoli, 1772)
- Pseudoips prasinana (Linnaeus, 1758)

=== Notodontidae ===
- Cerura vinula (Linnaeus, 1758)
- Clostera curtula (Linnaeus, 1758)
- Clostera pigra (Hufnagel, 1766)
- Dicranura ulmi (Denis & Schiffermuller, 1775)
- Gluphisia crenata (Esper, 1785)
- Harpyia milhauseri (Fabricius, 1775)
- Notodonta torva (Hübner, 1803)
- Notodonta ziczac (Linnaeus, 1758)
- Peridea anceps (Goeze, 1781)
- Phalera bucephala (Linnaeus, 1758)
- Pheosia tremula (Clerck, 1759)
- Pterostoma palpina (Clerck, 1759)
- Ptilodon capucina (Linnaeus, 1758)
- Stauropus fagi (Linnaeus, 1758)
- Thaumetopoea pinivora (Treitschke, 1834)
- Thaumetopoea pityocampa (Denis & Schiffermuller, 1775)
- Thaumetopoea processionea (Linnaeus, 1758)

=== Oecophoridae ===
- Alabonia staintoniella (Zeller, 1850)
- Bisigna procerella (Denis & Schiffermuller, 1775)
- Endrosis sarcitrella (Linnaeus, 1758)
- Epicallima formosella (Denis & Schiffermuller, 1775)
- Harpella forficella (Scopoli, 1763)
- Schiffermuelleria schaefferella (Linnaeus, 1758)

=== Pterophoridae ===
- Emmelina monodactyla (Linnaeus, 1758)
- Pterophorus pentadactyla (Linnaeus, 1758)

=== Pyralidae ===
- Acrobasis glaucella Staudinger, 1859
- Aphomia sociella (Linnaeus, 1758)
- Aphomia zelleri de Joannis, 1932
- Endotricha flammealis (Denis & Schiffermuller, 1775)
- Ephestia unicolorella Staudinger, 1881
- Epischnia prodromella (Hübner, 1799)
- Hypsopygia costalis (Fabricius, 1775)
- Hypsopygia glaucinalis (Linnaeus, 1758)
- Isauria dilucidella (Duponchel, 1836)
- Pyralis lienigialis (Zeller, 1843)
- Pyralis regalis Denis & Schiffermuller, 1775
- Salebriopsis albicilla (Herrich-Schäffer, 1849)
- Synaphe moldavica (Esper, 1794)

=== Scythrididae ===
- Scythris apicalis (Zeller, 1847)
- Scythris bifissella (O. Hofmann, 1889)
- Scythris cicadella (Zeller, 1839)
- Scythris clavella (Zeller, 1855)
- Scythris cuspidella (Denis & Schiffermuller, 1775)
- Scythris disparella (Tengstrom, 1848)
- Scythris flabella (Mann, 1861)
- Scythris fuscoaenea (Haworth, 1828)
- Scythris fuscopterella Bengtsson, 1977
- Scythris inertella (Zeller, 1855)
- Scythris laminella (Denis & Schiffermuller, 1775)
- Scythris limbella (Fabricius, 1775)
- Scythris palustris (Zeller, 1855)
- Scythris picaepennis (Haworth, 1828)
- Scythris podoliensis Rebel, 1938
- Scythris productella (Zeller, 1839)
- Scythris pudorinella (Moschler, 1866)
- Scythris seliniella (Zeller, 1839)
- Scythris setiella (Zeller, 1870)
- Scythris sinensis (Felder & Rogenhofer, 1875)
- Scythris subseliniella (Heinemann, 1876)

=== Sesiidae ===
- Bembecia ichneumoniformis (Denis & Schiffermuller, 1775)
- Chamaesphecia palustris Kautz, 1927
- Paranthrene tabaniformis (Rottemburg, 1775)
- Sesia apiformis (Clerck, 1759)
- Synanthedon myopaeformis (Borkhausen, 1789)
- Synanthedon tipuliformis (Clerck, 1759)
- Synanthedon vespiformis (Linnaeus, 1761)

=== Sphingidae ===
- Acherontia atropos (Linnaeus, 1758)
- Agrius convolvuli (Linnaeus, 1758)
- Deilephila elpenor (Linnaeus, 1758)
- Deilephila porcellus (Linnaeus, 1758)
- Dolbina elegans A. Bang-Haas, 1912
- Hemaris tityus (Linnaeus, 1758)
- Hyles euphorbiae (Linnaeus, 1758)
- Hyles gallii (Rottemburg, 1775)
- Hyles hippophaes (Esper, 1789)
- Laothoe populi (Linnaeus, 1758)
- Macroglossum stellatarum (Linnaeus, 1758)
- Marumba quercus (Denis & Schiffermuller, 1775)
- Mimas tiliae (Linnaeus, 1758)
- Smerinthus ocellata (Linnaeus, 1758)
- Sphinx ligustri Linnaeus, 1758

=== Thyrididae ===
- Thyris fenestrella (Scopoli, 1763)

=== Tineidae ===
- Nemapogon inconditella (Lucas, 1956)
- Nemapogon nigralbella (Zeller, 1839)
- Nemapogon ruricolella (Stainton, 1849)
- Tenaga rhenania (Petersen, 1962)

=== Tischeriidae ===
- Coptotriche angusticollella (Duponchel, 1843)

=== Tortricidae ===
- Cydia pomonella (Linnaeus, 1758)
- Grapholita fissana (Frolich, 1828)
- Tortrix viridana Linnaeus, 1758

=== Zygaenidae ===
- Adscita geryon (Hübner, 1813)
- Adscita statices (Linnaeus, 1758)
- Jordanita graeca (Jordan, 1907)
- Jordanita subsolana (Staudinger, 1862)
- Rhagades pruni (Denis & Schiffermuller, 1775)
- Theresimima ampellophaga (Bayle-Barelle, 1808)
- Zygaena carniolica (Scopoli, 1763)
- Zygaena brizae (Esper, 1800)
- Zygaena cynarae (Esper, 1789)
- Zygaena laeta (Hübner, 1790)
- Zygaena punctum Ochsenheimer, 1808
- Zygaena purpuralis (Brunnich, 1763)
- Zygaena angelicae Ochsenheimer, 1808
- Zygaena ephialtes (Linnaeus, 1767)
- Zygaena filipendulae (Linnaeus, 1758)
- Zygaena lonicerae (Scheven, 1777)
- Zygaena loti (Denis & Schiffermuller, 1775)
- Zygaena osterodensis Reiss, 1921
- Zygaena viciae (Denis & Schiffermuller, 1775)
