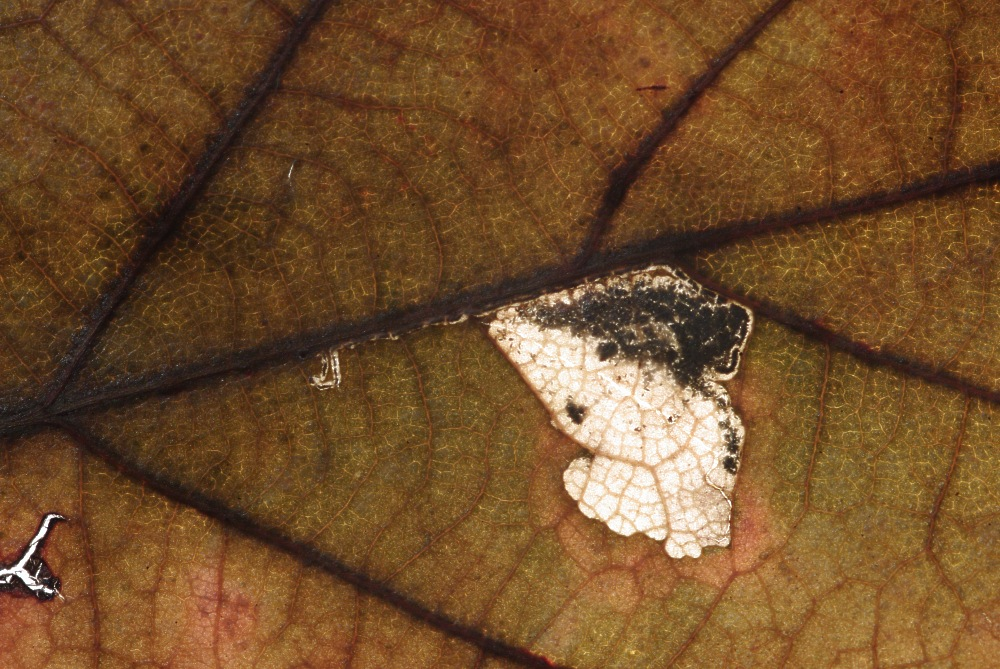
- Ectoedemia heringi leafmine Austria

Scientific classification
- Kingdom: Animalia
- Phylum: Arthropoda
- Class: Insecta
- Order: Lepidoptera
- Family: Nepticulidae
- Genus: Ectoedemia
- Species: E. heringi

Binomial name
- Ectoedemia heringi (Toll, 1934)

Synonyms
- Nepticula heringi Toll, 1934; Nepticula quercifoliae Toll, 1943; Nepticula sativella Klimesch, 1936; Nepticula zimmermanni Hering, 1942

= Ectoedemia heringi =

Species of moth

Ectoedemia heringi is a moth of the family Nepticulidae. It is found from southern Great Britain and Ireland to Poland and further east to central Russia.

The wingspan is 4.2-5.3 mm. Differentiated from the slightly smaller Ectoedemia subbimaculella by the darker head and the ductus spermathecae in the female.

Adults are on wing in May in the south and in June and July more in the north. There is one generation per year.

The larvae feed on Castanea sativa, Quercus faginea, Quercus macrolepis, Quercus petraea, Quercus pubescens and Quercus robur. They mine the leaves of their host plant. Pupation takes place outside of the mine.

The name honours the German entomologist Erich Martin Hering.
