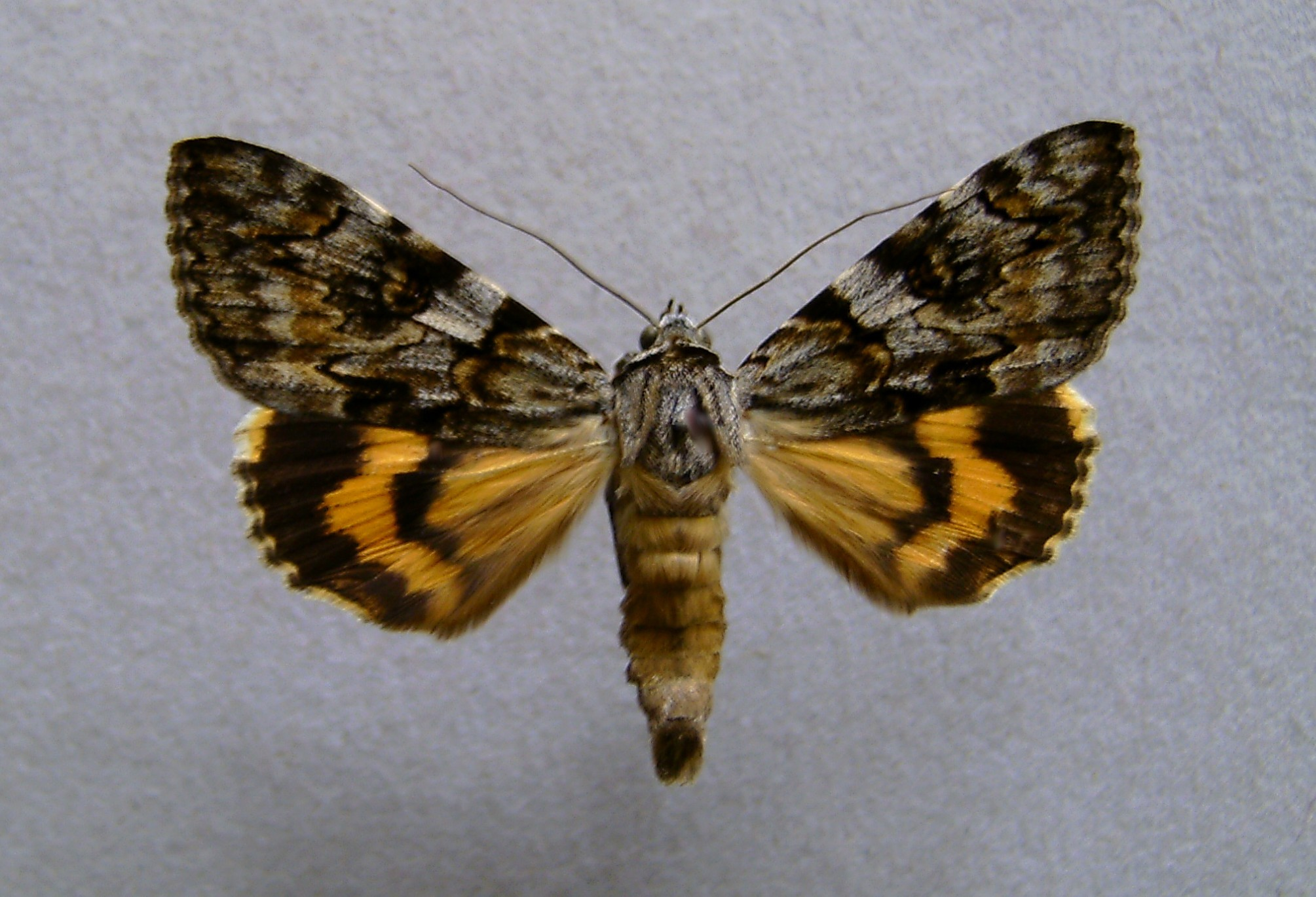

Scientific classification
- Kingdom: Animalia
- Phylum: Arthropoda
- Class: Insecta
- Order: Lepidoptera
- Superfamily: Noctuoidea
- Family: Erebidae
- Genus: Catocala
- Species: C. conversa

Binomial name
- Catocala conversa (Esper, 1787)

Synonyms
- Noctua conversa Esper, 1787; Noctua pasythea Hübner, [1809]; Noctua agamos Hübner, [1813]

= Catocala conversa =

Species of moth

Catocala conversa is a moth of the family Erebidae first described by Eugenius Johann Christoph Esper in 1787. It is found in the Mediterranean zone and parts of the sub-Mediterranean zone (southern Europe, North Africa and Asia Minor).

The wingspan varies from 50–54 mm. Similar to other moths, their generation time is one year. Adults are on wing from June to August.

The larvae feed on Quercus species.
