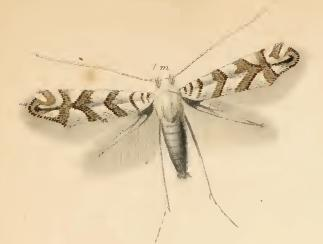

Scientific classification
- Domain: Eukaryota
- Kingdom: Animalia
- Phylum: Arthropoda
- Class: Insecta
- Order: Lepidoptera
- Family: Gracillariidae
- Genus: Phyllonorycter
- Species: P. acerifoliella

Binomial name
- Phyllonorycter acerifoliella (Zeller, 1839)

Synonyms
- Lithocolletis acerifoliella Zeller, 1839; Tinea sylvella Haworth, 1828

= Phyllonorycter acerifoliella =

Species of moth

Phyllonorycter acerifoliella is a moth of the family Gracillariidae. It is found from Sweden to the Pyrenees, Italy, Albania and Bulgaria, and from Great Britain to southern Russia.

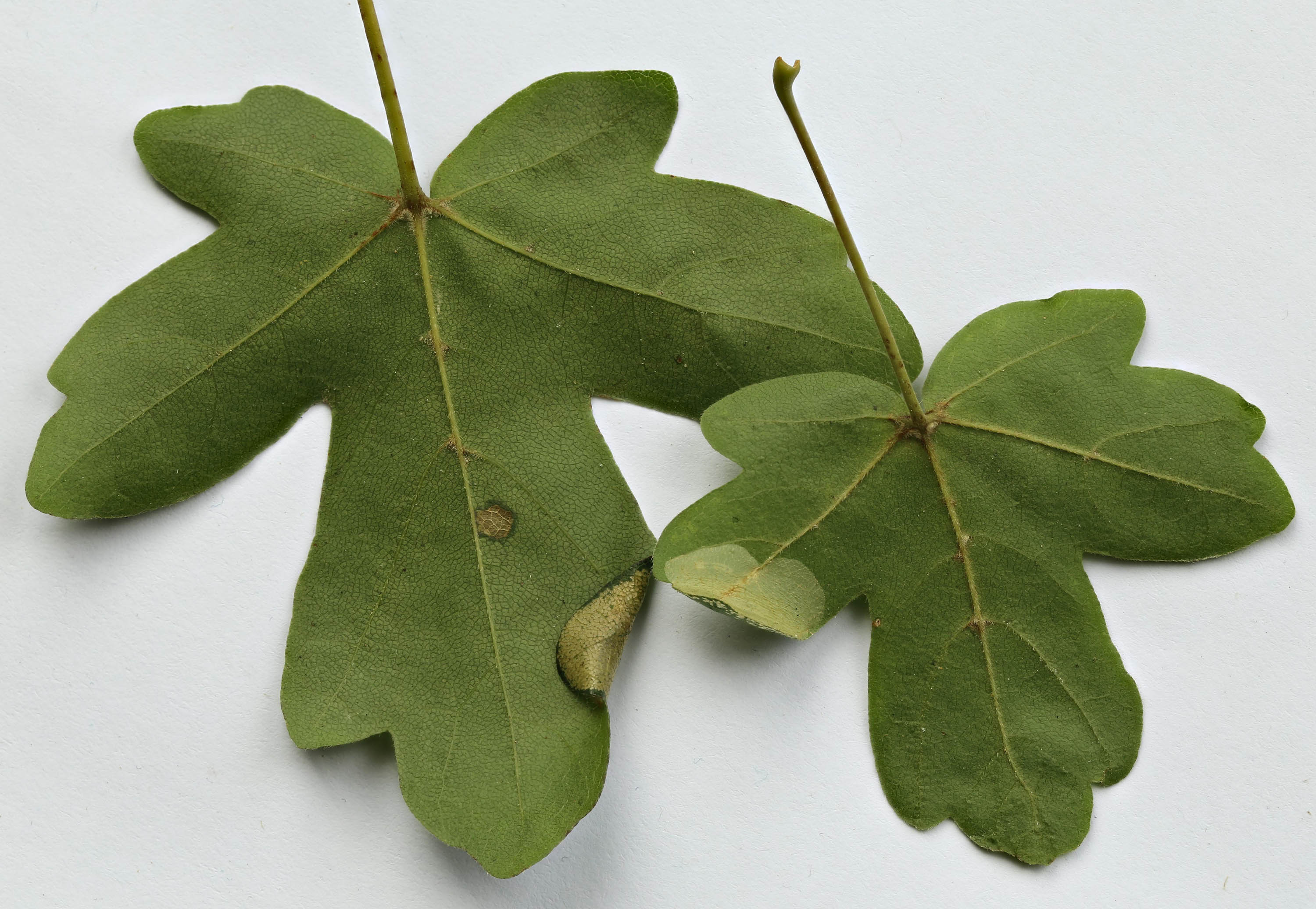
Mines on field maple

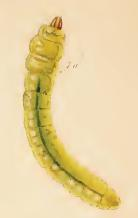
Larva

The wingspan is about 8 mm. Adults are on wing in May and August in two generations in western Europe.

The larvae feed on field maple (Acer campestre) and Tatar maple (Acer tataricum), mining the leaves of their host plant.
