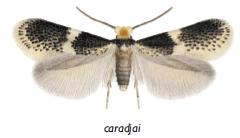
- Male

Scientific classification
- Kingdom: Animalia
- Phylum: Arthropoda
- Class: Insecta
- Order: Lepidoptera
- Family: Nepticulidae
- Genus: Ectoedemia
- Species: E. caradjai

Binomial name
- Ectoedemia caradjai (Groschke, 1944)

Synonyms
- Nepticula caradjai Groschke, 1944

= Ectoedemia caradjai =

Species of moth

Ectoedemia caradjai is a moth of the family Nepticulidae. It is found in southern and central Europe, north to Austria, southern Moravia in the Czech Republic and Ukraine. It has also been recorded from Moldova. It was first recorded from Devonshire in Great Britain in 2004.

The wingspan is 4.2-5.3 mm for males and 5.2-5.8 mm for females.

The larvae feed on Quercus coccifera, Quercus frainetto, Quercus macrolepis, Quercus petraea, Quercus pubescens, Quercus pyrenaica and Quercus robur. They mine the leaves of their host plant.

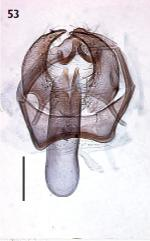
Male genitalia
