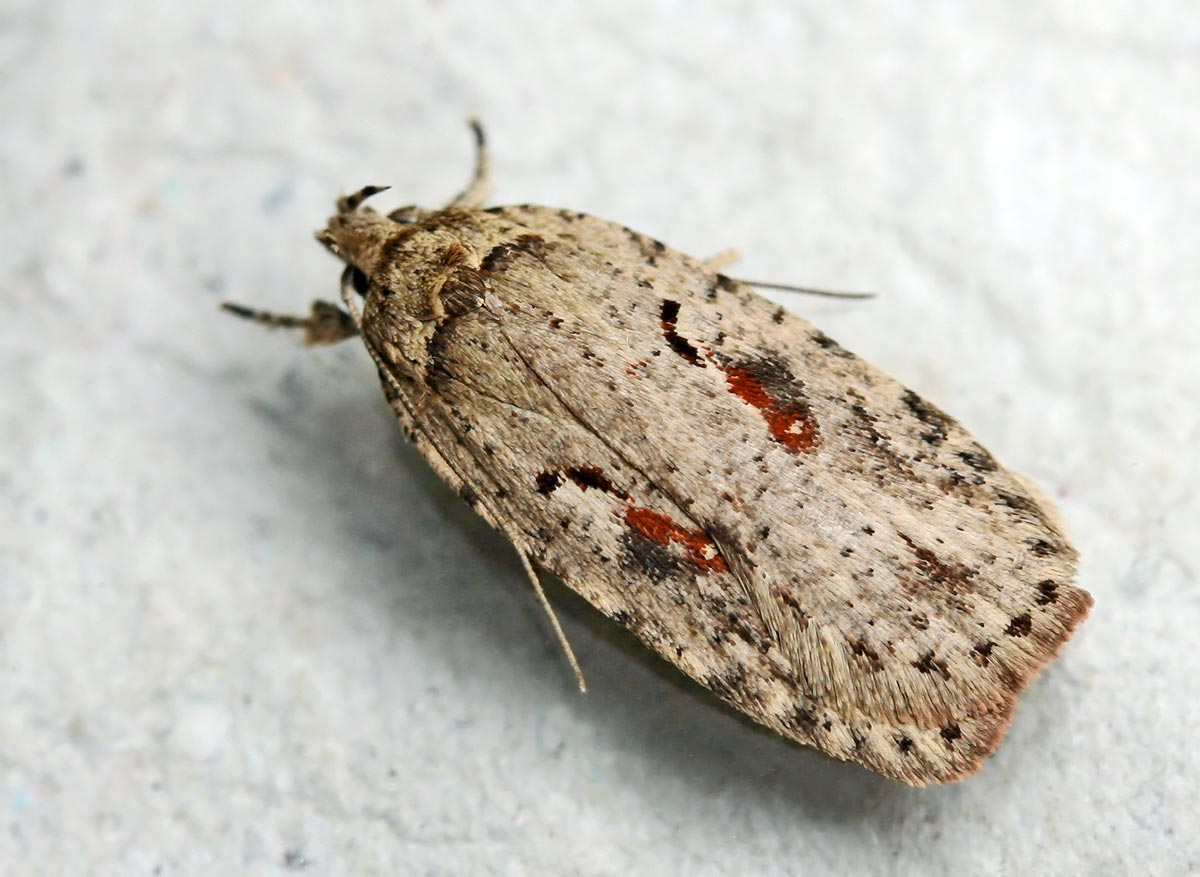

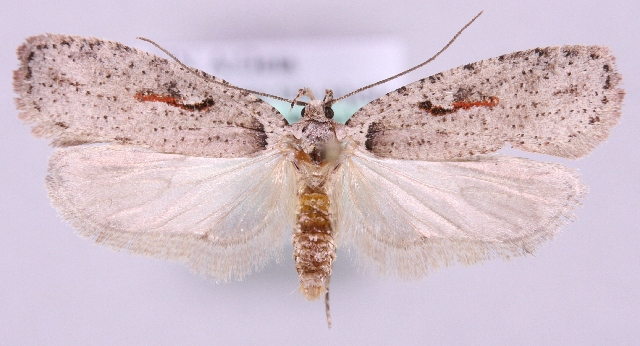

Scientific classification
- Kingdom: Animalia
- Phylum: Arthropoda
- Clade: Pancrustacea
- Class: Insecta
- Order: Lepidoptera
- Family: Depressariidae
- Genus: Agonopterix
- Species: A. ocellana

Binomial name
- Agonopterix ocellana (Fabricius, 1775)

Synonyms
- Pyralis ocellana Fabricius, 1775; Haemylis characterella Treitschke, 1832; Depressaria rubrolineella Bruand, [1851]; Depressaria ocellana var. umbrana Strand, 1916

= Agonopterix ocellana =

Species of moth

Agonopterix ocellana is a species of moth of the family Depressariidae. It is found in Europe and was first described by Johan Christian Fabricius in 1775.

== Description ==
The moth is relatively easy to identify by the combination of black, white and rufous colours in the centre of the pale-sandy brown forewing. The wingspan is 19–22 mm. Meyrick describes it - The forewings are whitish-ochreous, slightly fuscous-tinged, more or less sprinkled with black;first discal stigma black mixed with red, preceded by a similar dot obliquely above and sometimes connected with it, second white edged with red; between and above these a dark fuscous spot edged beneath with red; blackish terminal dots. Hindwings are fuscous-whitish. The larva is pale green; dots black; head yellow-brownish.

It is single brooded, hibernates as an adult and can be found all year round. Comes to light.

=== Egg ===
Eggs are laid on the shoots of many species of willow (Salix species) in May.

=== Larva ===
Full grown larvae are 17 mm long. The body of a later instar is apple green with a pale brown head. (Note: For a full description see the UKmoths site) They feed in spun or rolled leaves of willows in June and July. In mid-Europe they also feed on birch (Betula species) and oak (Quercus species).

=== Pupa ===
Pupa can be found in the soil or amongst detritus in July and August.

== Distribution ==
Found throughout Europe.
