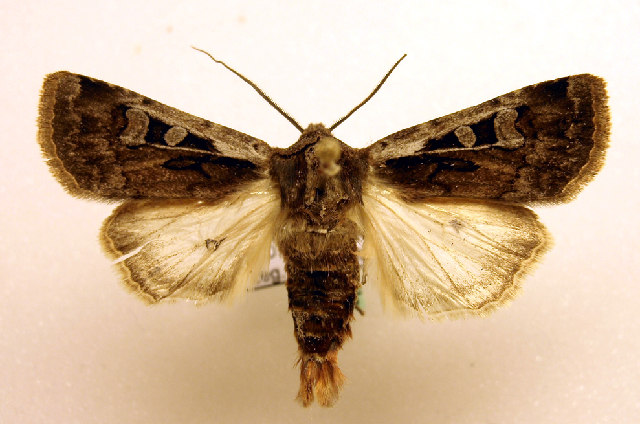

Scientific classification
- Domain: Eukaryota
- Kingdom: Animalia
- Phylum: Arthropoda
- Class: Insecta
- Order: Lepidoptera
- Superfamily: Noctuoidea
- Family: Noctuidae
- Genus: Euxoa
- Species: E. vitta

Binomial name
- Euxoa vitta (Esper, 1789)

Synonyms
- Phalaena (Noctua) vitta Esper, 1789

= Euxoa vitta =

Species of moth

Euxoa vitta is a moth of the family Noctuidae. It is found in central and southern Europe.

== Description ==
The wingspan is 32–40 mm. Warren states E. vitta Esp. (7 b). Distinguished from recussa, and islandica and the forms of tritici by the broad vitta, greyish white costal streak; a local species, found only in Switzerland, Austria and Hungary.

== Biology ==
Adults are on wing from August to October. There is one generation per year.
