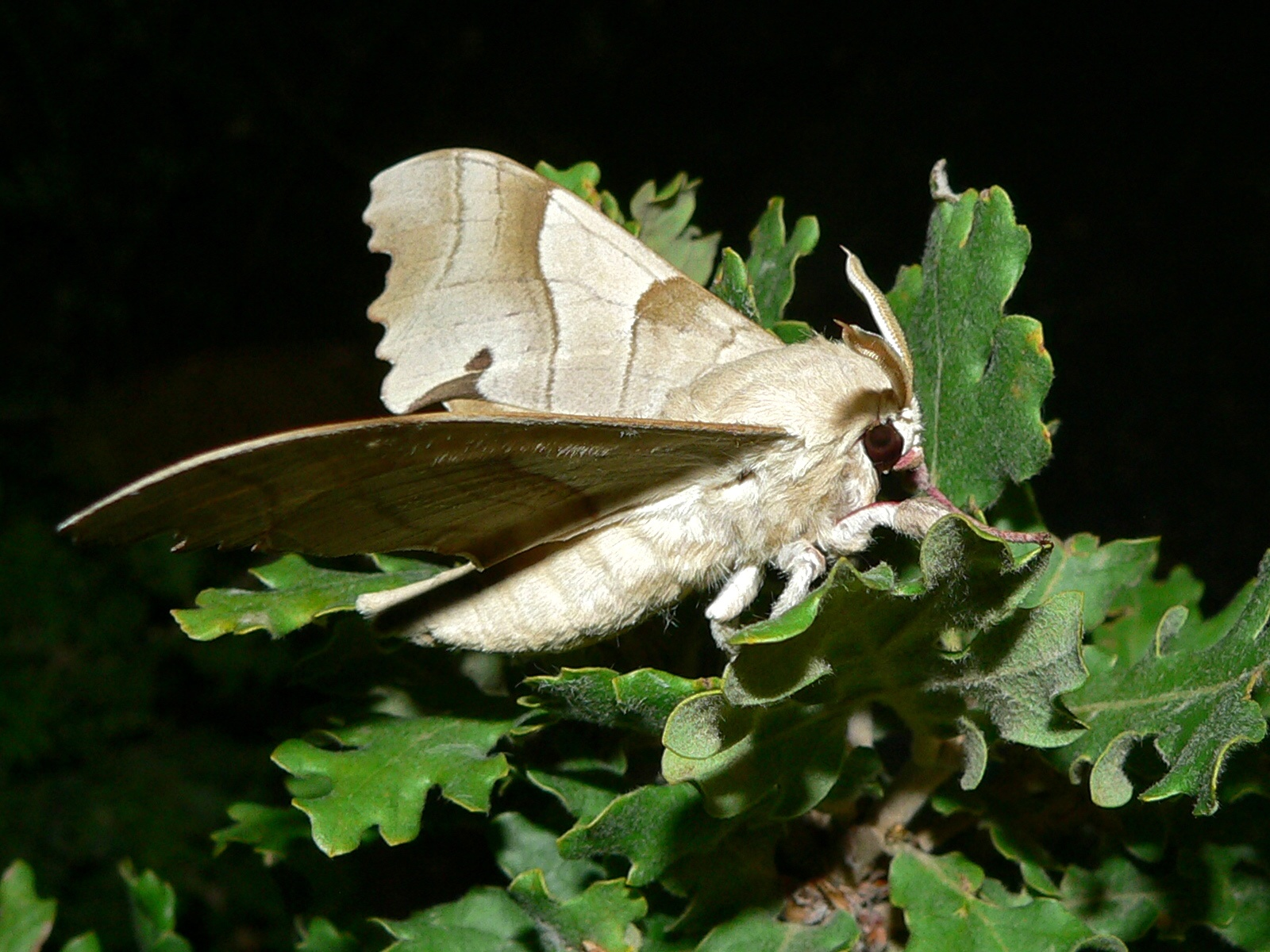

Scientific classification
- Domain: Eukaryota
- Kingdom: Animalia
- Phylum: Arthropoda
- Class: Insecta
- Order: Lepidoptera
- Family: Sphingidae
- Genus: Marumba
- Species: M. quercus

Binomial name
- Marumba quercus (Denis & Schiffermüller, 1775)
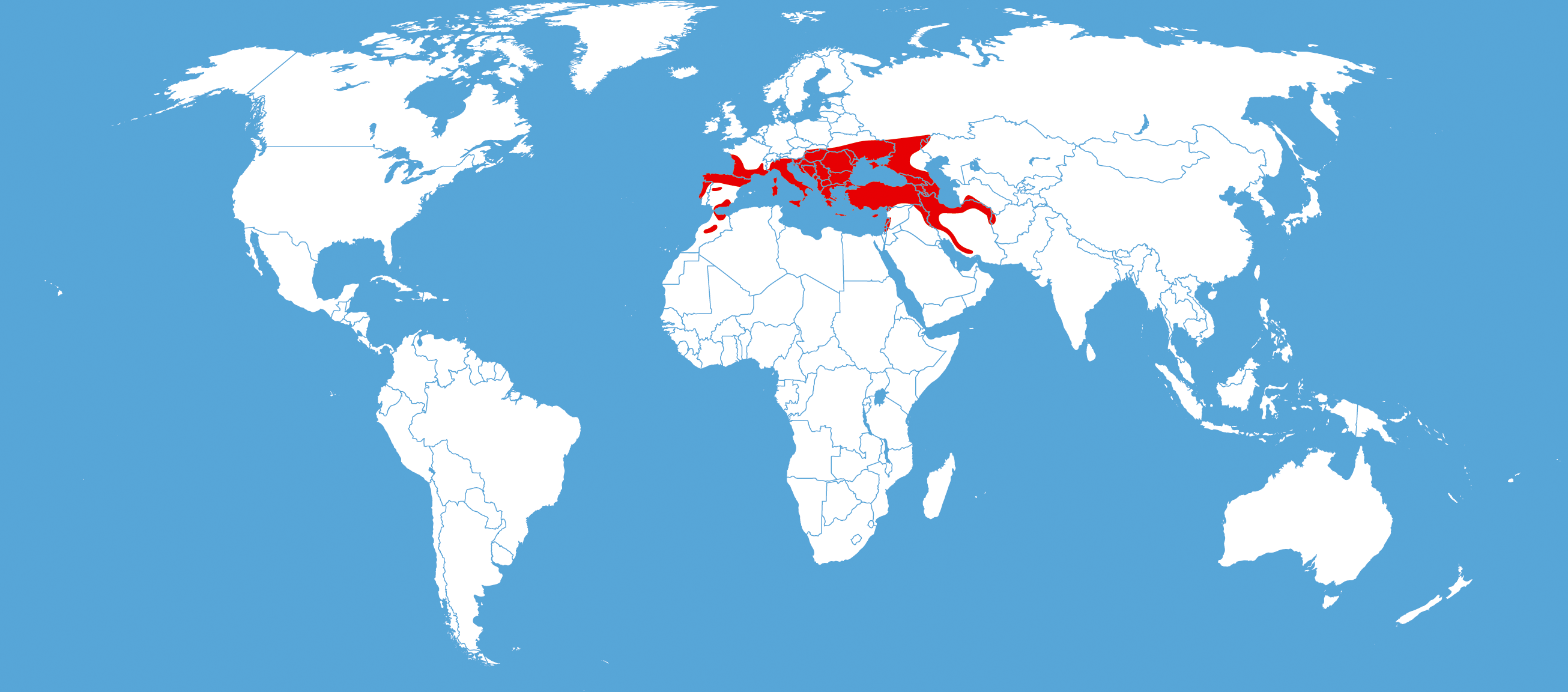

Synonyms
- Sphinx quercus Denis & Schiffermüller, 1775; Sphinx denisii Fuessly, 1779; Marumba quercus brunnescens Rebel, 1910; Marumba quercus canescens (Closs, 1922); Marumba quercus costimaculata (O. Bang-Haas, 1938); Marumba quercus mesopotamica O. Bang-Haas, 1938; Marumba quercus pallescens (Closs, 1922); Marumba quercus pallida (Vilarrubia, 1973); Marumba quercus schirasi O. Bang-Haas, 1938

= Marumba quercus =

Oak hawk-moth

Species of moth

Marumba quercus, the oak hawk-moth, is a moth of the family Sphingidae. The species was first described by Michael Denis and Ignaz Schiffermüller in 1775.

== Distribution ==
It is found in southern Europe, North Africa, the Near East and Mesopotamia.

== Description ==
The wingspan is 85–125 mm. The female is slightly larger than the male.

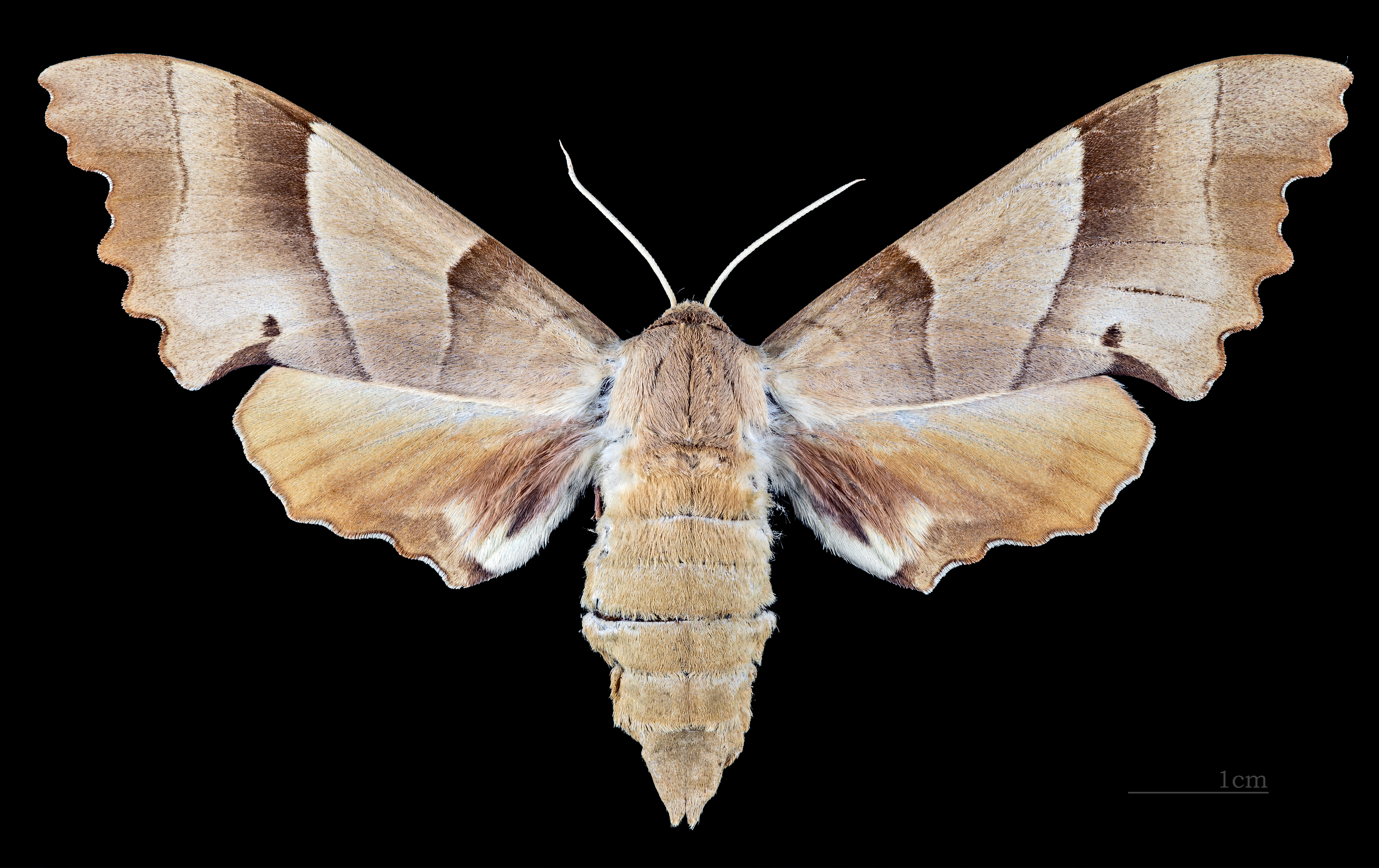
Female

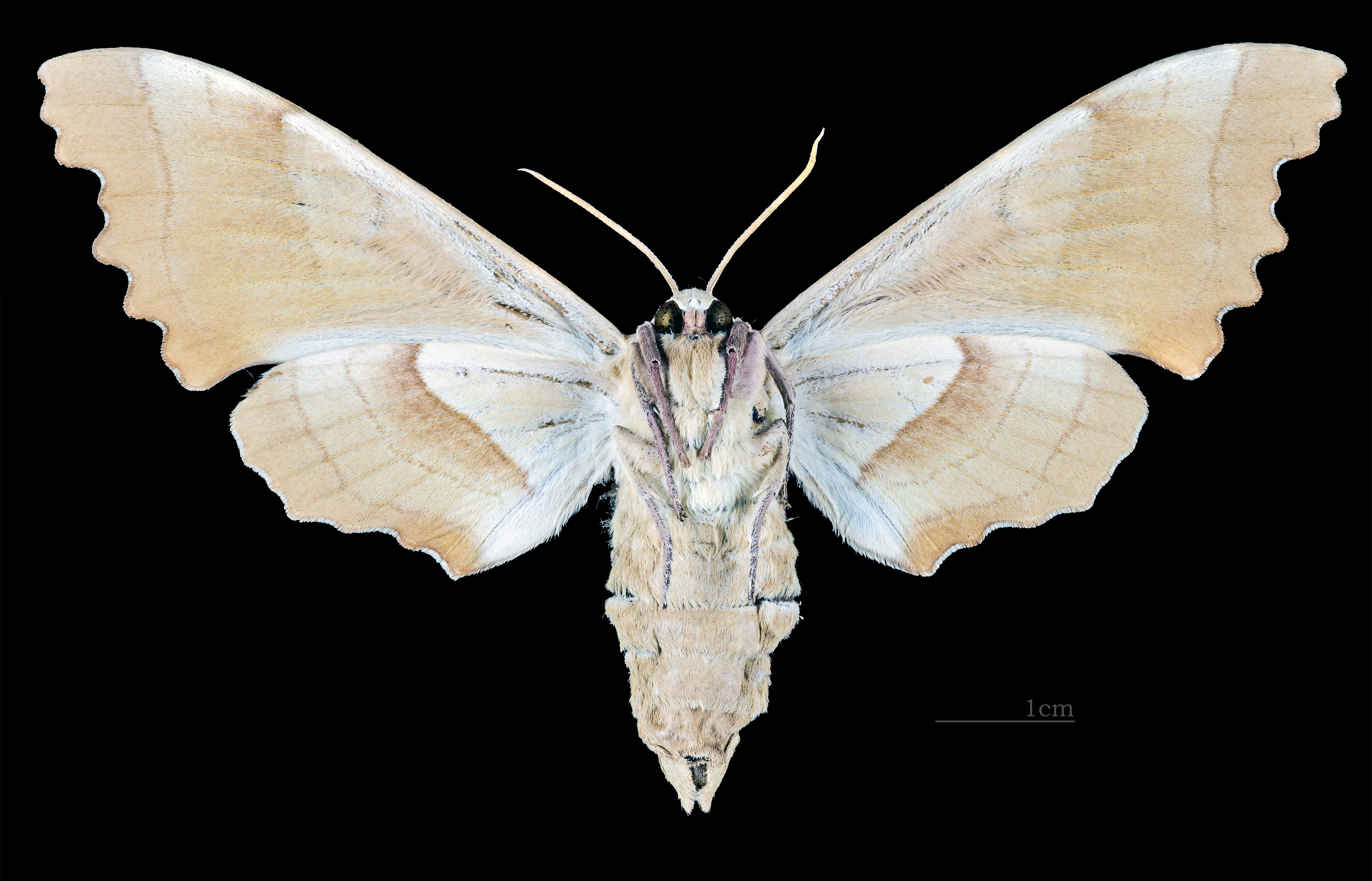
Female underside

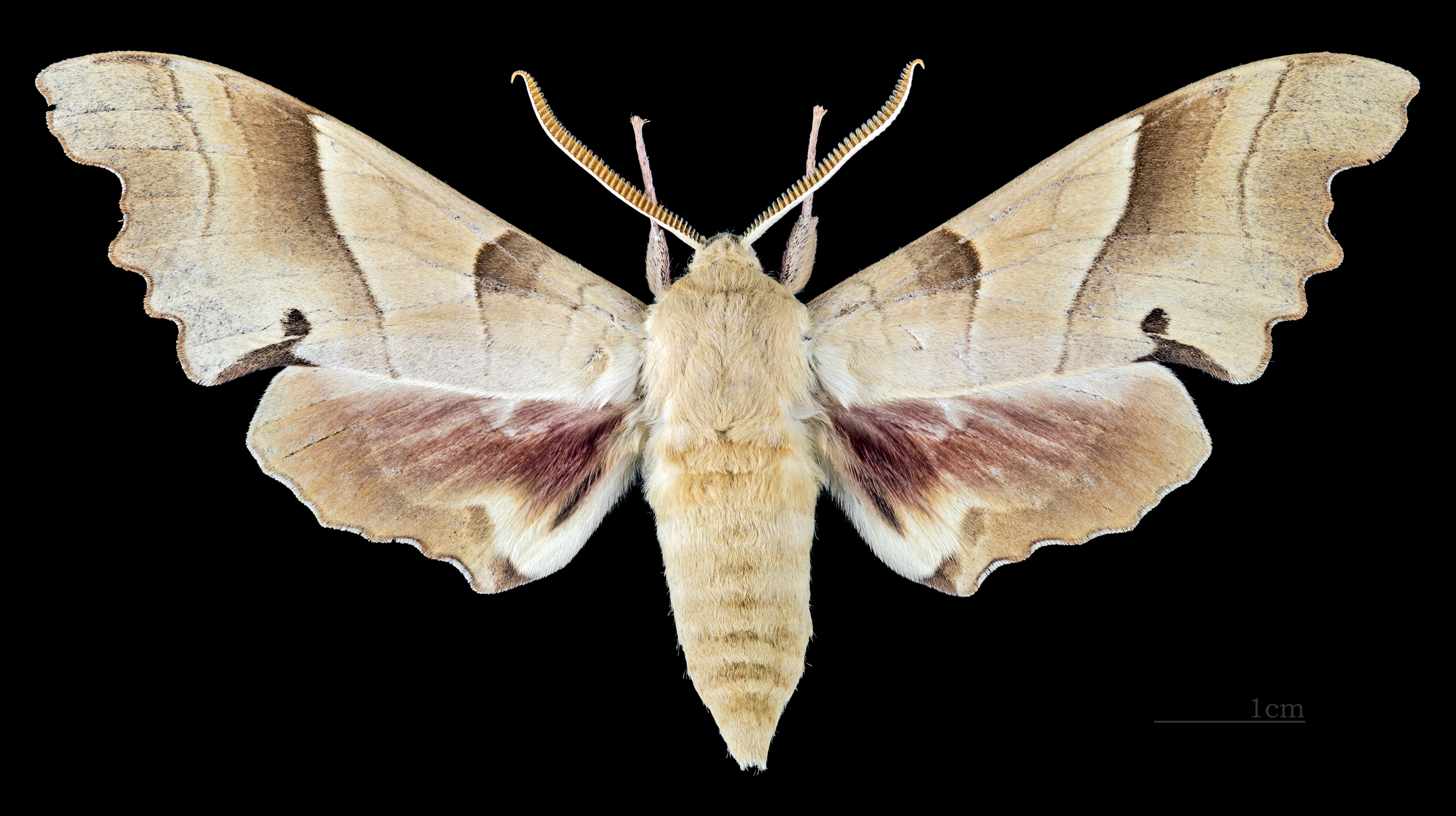
Male

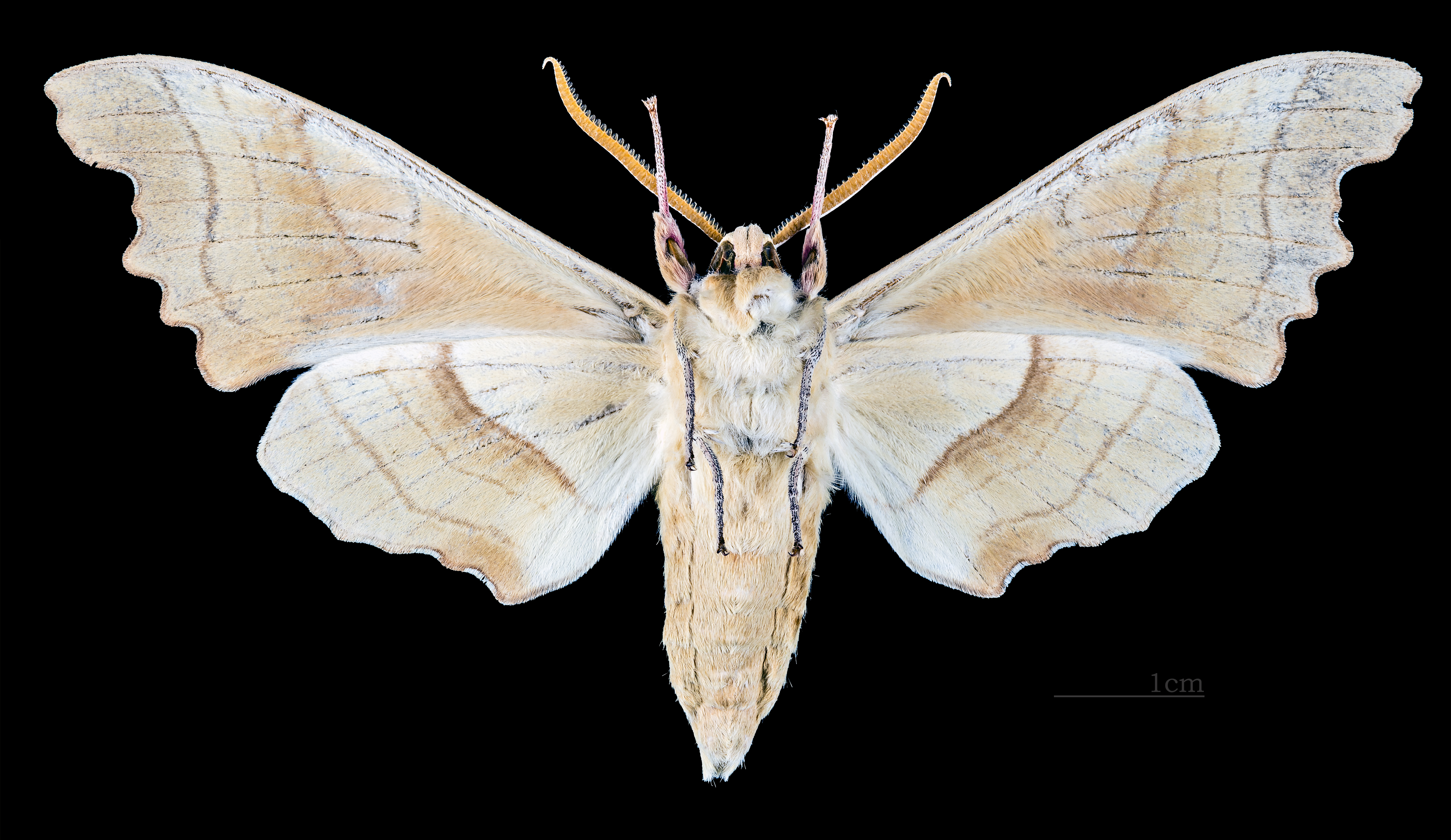
Male underside
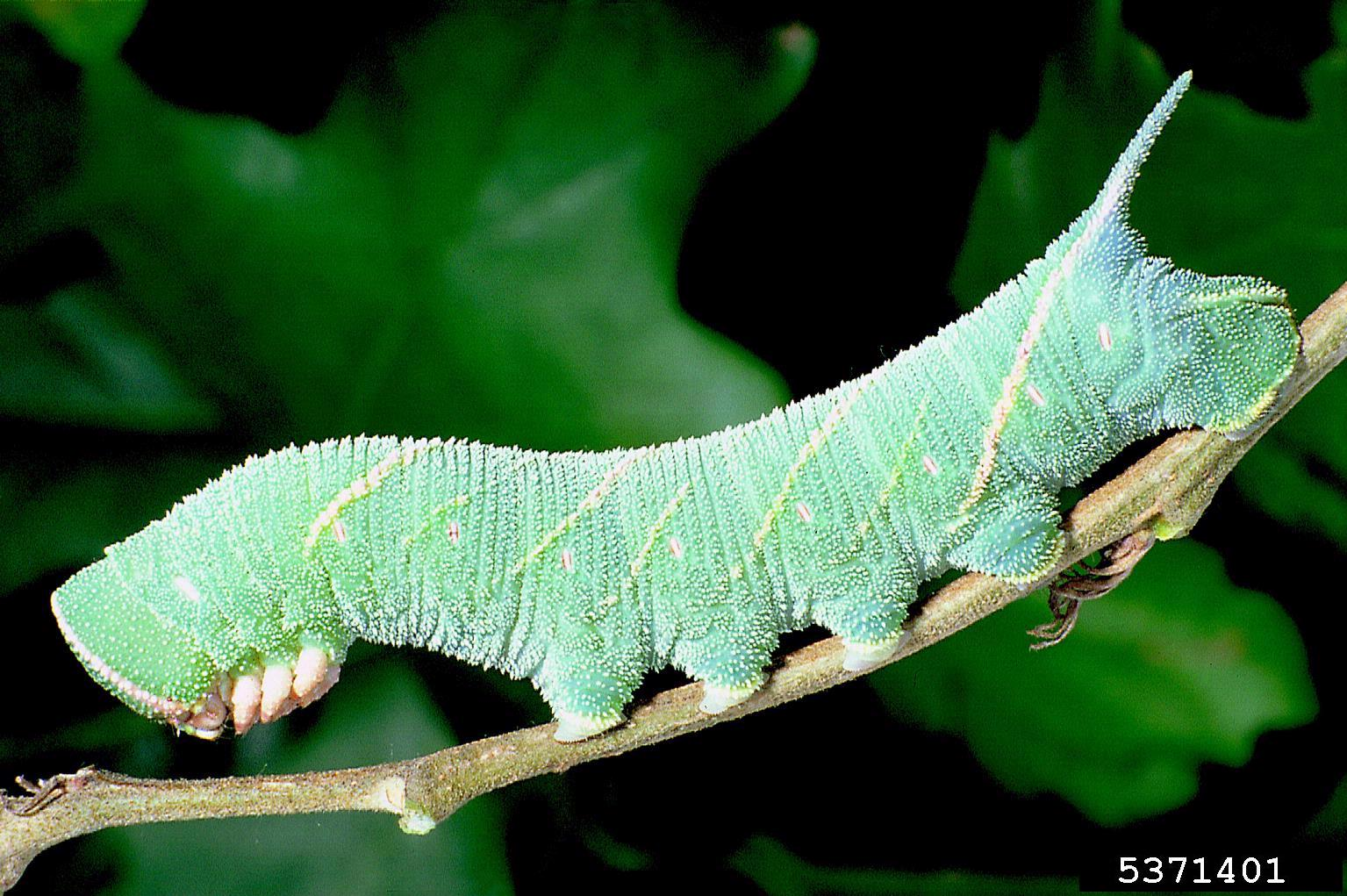
Caterpillar

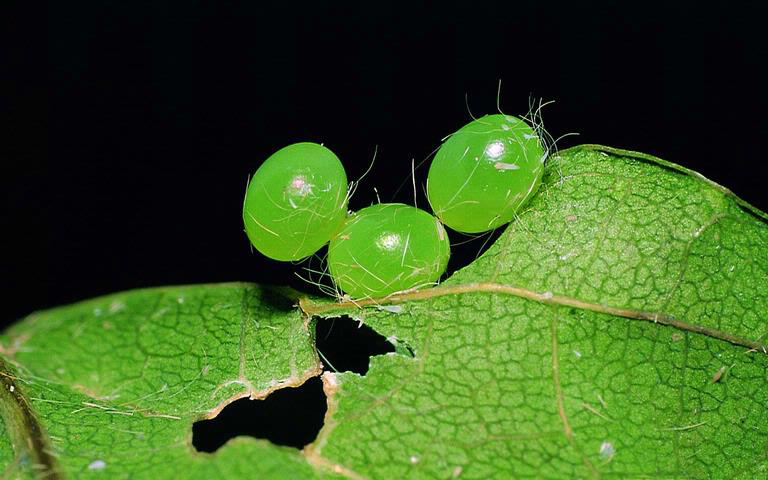
Eggs

== Biology ==
The larvae feed on oak species, primarily species with dry leaves such as cork oak and holm oak.
