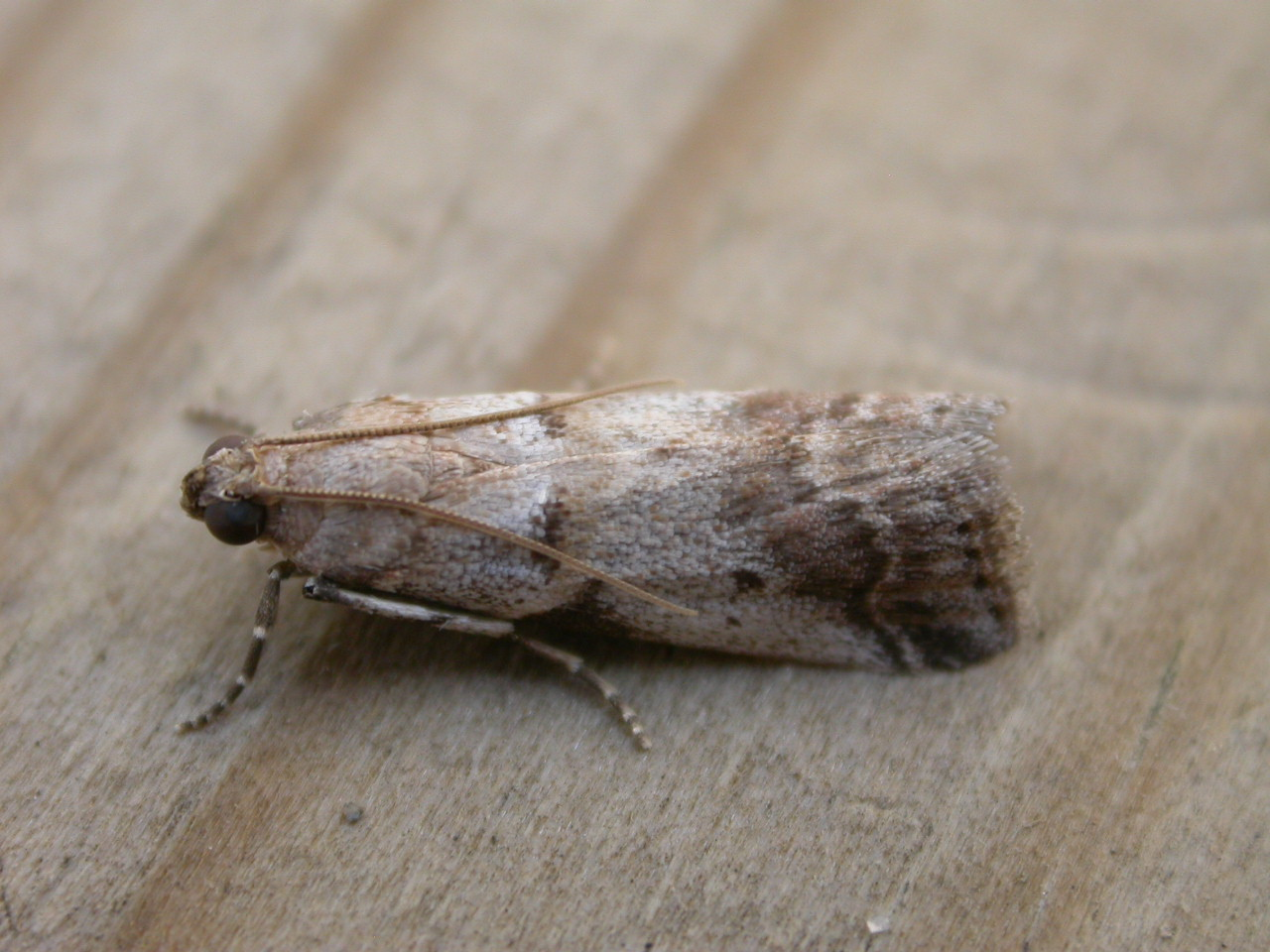

Scientific classification
- Kingdom: Animalia
- Phylum: Arthropoda
- Clade: Pancrustacea
- Class: Insecta
- Order: Lepidoptera
- Family: Pyralidae
- Genus: Acrobasis
- Species: A. glaucella

Binomial name
- Acrobasis glaucella Staudinger, 1859

Synonyms
- Acrobasis burmanni Roesler, 1969; Acrobasis glycerella Herrich-Schäffer, 1860; Acrobasis glaucella glareella Turati, 1926; Acrobasis fallouella burmanni Roesler, 1969; Acrobasis glaucella medea Roesler, 1988

= Acrobasis glaucella =

Species of moth

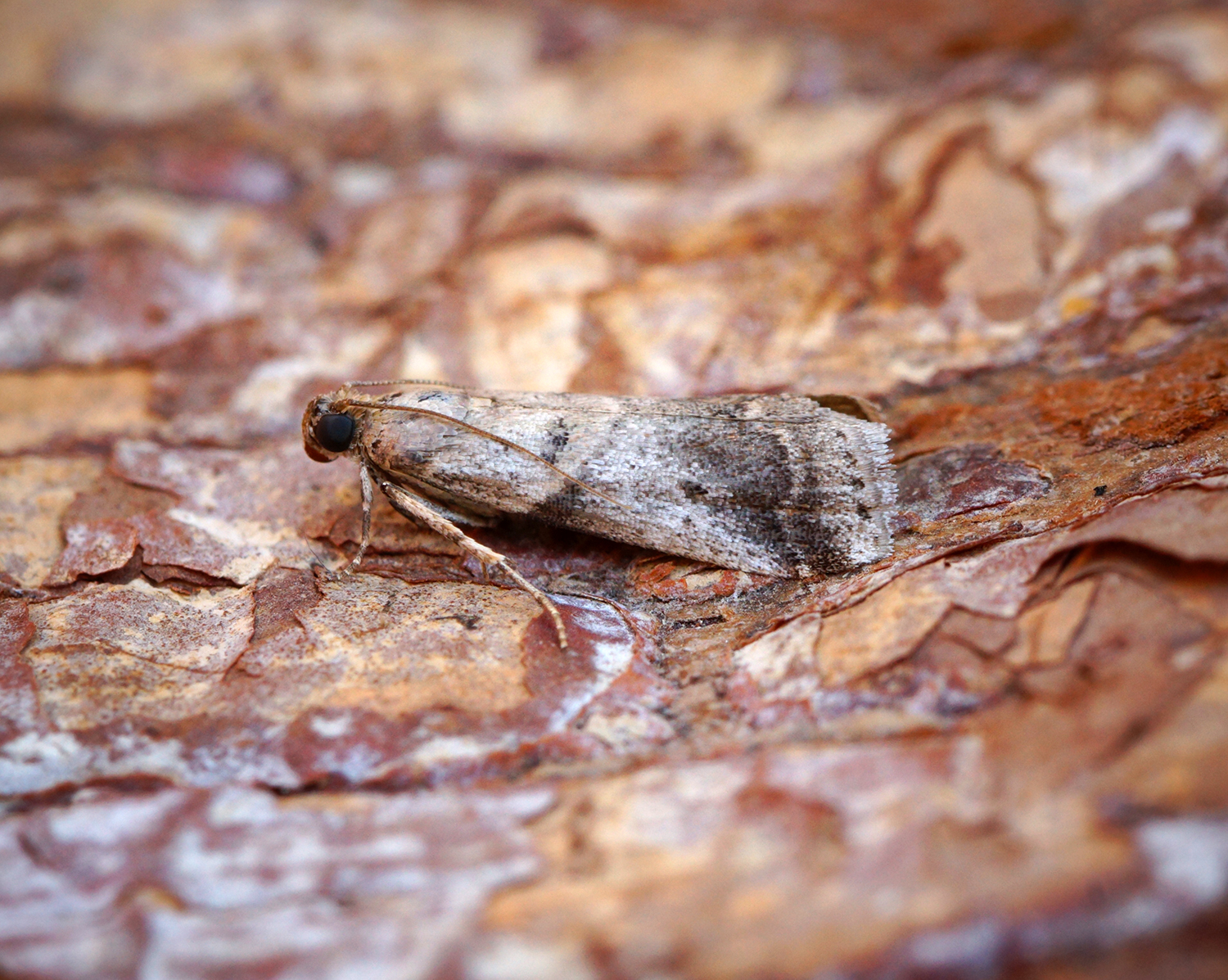
Acrobasis glaucella

Acrobasis glaucella is a moth of the family Pyralidae described by Otto Staudinger in 1859. It is found in most of Europe.

The wingspan is 19–23 mm. Adults are on wing from June to August.

The larvae feed on various oak species.
