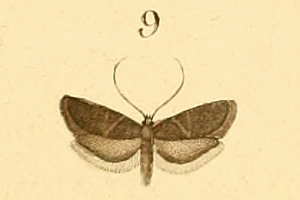

Scientific classification
- Domain: Eukaryota
- Kingdom: Animalia
- Phylum: Arthropoda
- Class: Insecta
- Order: Lepidoptera
- Family: Lecithoceridae
- Genus: Lecithocera
- Species: L. nigrana

Binomial name
- Lecithocera nigrana (Duponchel, 1835)

Synonyms
- Phibalocera nigrana Duponchel, 1835; Carcina luticornella Zeller, 1839; Lecithocera orsoviella Heinemann, 1870

= Lecithocera nigrana =

Species of moth in genus Lecithocera

Lecithocera nigrana is a moth in the family Lecithoceridae. It was described by Philogène Auguste Joseph Duponchel in 1835. It is found in Spain, France, Germany, Italy, Austria, Switzerland, Slovakia, the Czech Republic, Albania, Croatia, Slovenia, Bosnia-Herzegovina, Montenegro, Serbia, Bulgaria, Romania, Hungary, Greece, Turkey, Moldova and Ukraine, as well as on Sicily and Crete.

The wingspan is 12–14 mm. Adults are on wing from early June to the end of July in one generation per year.

The larvae feed on various broadleaved trees and shrubs.
