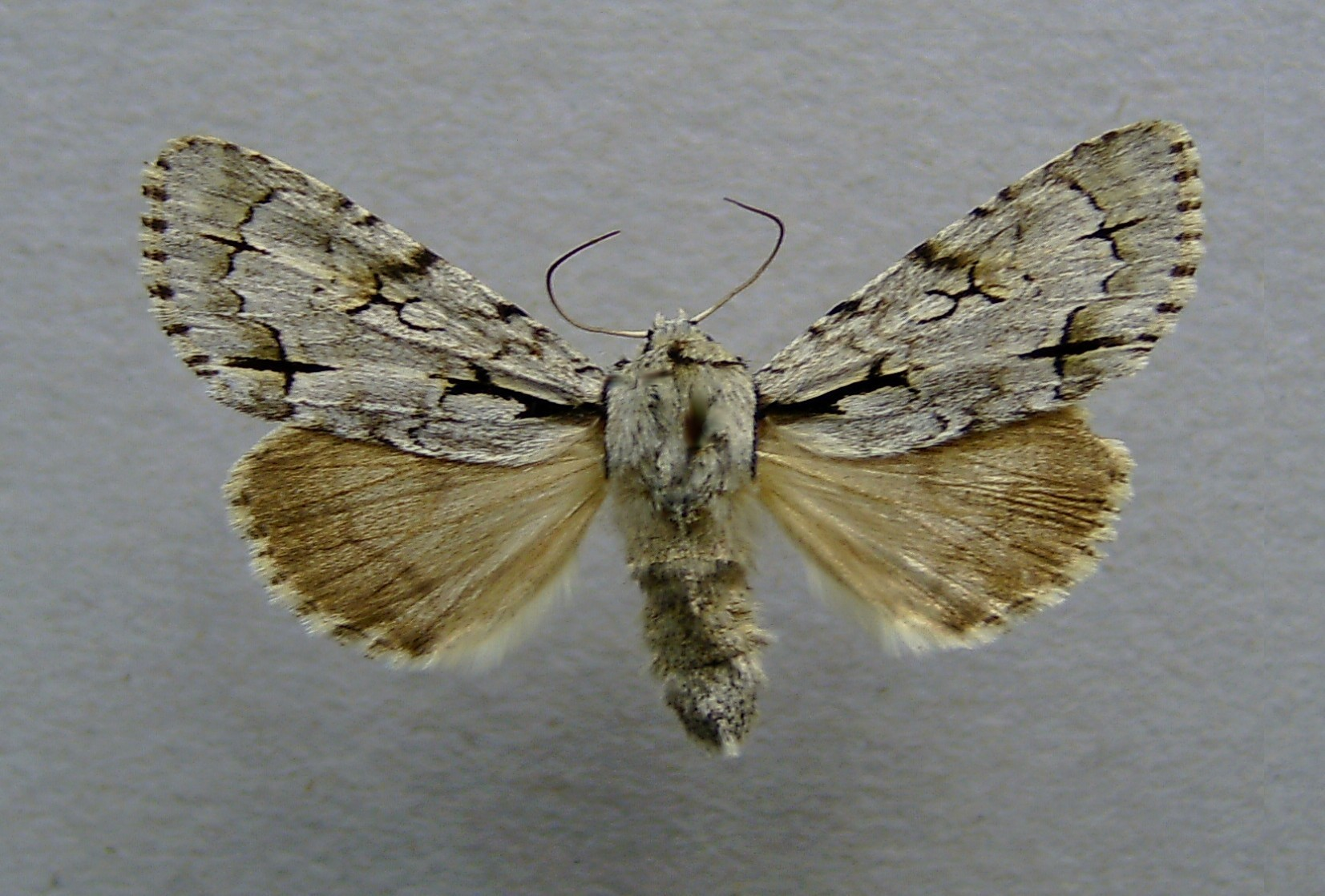

Scientific classification
- Kingdom: Animalia
- Phylum: Arthropoda
- Clade: Pancrustacea
- Class: Insecta
- Order: Lepidoptera
- Superfamily: Noctuoidea
- Family: Noctuidae
- Genus: Acronicta
- Species: A. cuspis

Binomial name
- Acronicta cuspis (Hübner, 1813)

Synonyms
- Noctua cuspis Hubner,[1813]

= Acronicta cuspis =

Species of moth

Acronicta cuspis, the large dagger, is a moth of the family Noctuidae. It is distributed through most of Europe, Northern Africa (Morocco), the European part of Russia, the Caucasus, the Russian Far East (Primorye, southern Khabarovsk, southern Amur region), southern Siberia, Transcaucasia, central Asia, China, Japan (Hokkaido, Honshu) and the Korean Peninsula.

== Technical description and variation ==
Like A. psi L., but paler, bluer grey; the black streaks thicker; stigmata united by a short black bar. leucocuspis Btlr., occurring in North China, Japan and Corea is larger and darker in tint. – taurica Stgr., on the contrary, is a much paler form, with the stigmata far apart, queried by Staudinger as possibly a distinct species. — Larva like that of psi, but the fleshy process on segment 5 bears a long tuft of black. The wingspan is 37–41 mm.

== Biology ==
The larvae feed on a number of plants, including alder, grey alder, rowan, silver birch and downy birch.
