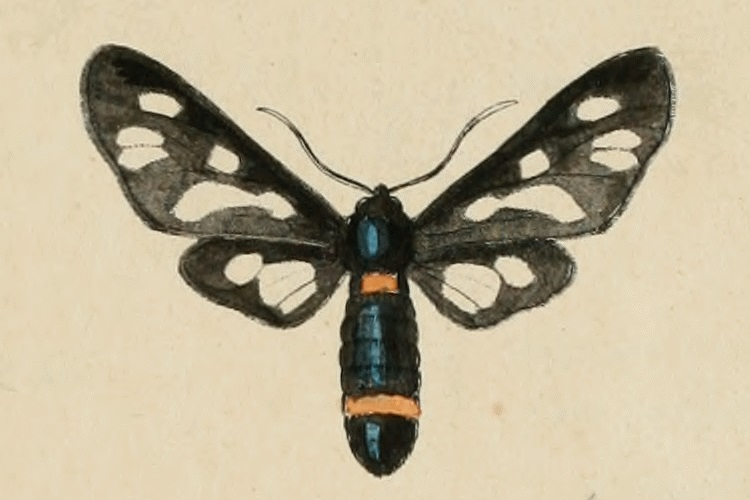

Scientific classification
- Domain: Eukaryota
- Kingdom: Animalia
- Phylum: Arthropoda
- Class: Insecta
- Order: Lepidoptera
- Superfamily: Noctuoidea
- Family: Erebidae
- Subfamily: Arctiinae
- Genus: Amata
- Species: A. kruegeri

Binomial name
- Amata kruegeri (Ragusa, 1904)

Synonyms
- Syntomis phegea ab. kruegeri Ragusa, 1904; Syntomis quercii Verity, 1914; Syntomis herthula ab. marjanoides Stauder, 1921; Amata mariana albionica Dufay, 1965; Syntomis albionica f. valbellensis Chauliac, 1986; Syntomis marjana r. pedemontii Rocci, 1941; Amata teriolica Obraztsov, 1966; Syntomis phegea marjana Stauder, 1913; Syntomis marjana macedonica Daniel, 1934; Syntomis marjana bulgarica Daniel, 1934; Syntomis marjana f. sontiana Stauder, 1928; Amata marjana odessana Obraztsov, 1935; Amata (Syntomis) sheljuzhkoi Obraztsov, 1966

= Amata kruegeri =

Ragusa's nine-spotted moth

Species of moth

Amata kruegeri, or Ragusa's nine-spotted moth, is a moth of the family Erebidae. The species was first described by Emile Enrico Ragusa in 1904. It is found in southern and eastern Europe.

The larvae feed on various low-growing plants, including Plantago, Rumex, Galium and Taraxacum species.

== Subspecies ==
- Amata kruegeri kruegeri (Sicily, Italy)
- Amata kruegeri albionica Dufay, 1965 (southern France)
- Amata kruegeri marjana (Stauder, 1913) (former Yugoslavia)
- Amata kruegeri odessana Obraztsov, 1935 (southern Ukraine)
- Amata kruegeri pedemontii (Rocci, 1941)
- Amata kruegeri quercii (Verity, 1914)
- Amata kruegeri sheljuzhkoi (Obraztsov, 1966) (Daghestan)
