= Stigmella desperatella =

Scientific classification
- Kingdom: Animalia
- Phylum: Arthropoda
- Class: Insecta
- Order: Lepidoptera
- Family: Nepticulidae
- Genus: Stigmella
- Species: S. desperatella

Binomial name
- Stigmella desperatella (Frey, 1856)

Synonyms
- Nepticula desperatella Frey, 1856; Nepticula pyricola Wocke, 1877

Species of moth

Stigmella desperatella is a moth of the family Nepticulidae. It is found from Estonia to the Pyrenees, Italy and Bulgaria, and from Great Britain to Ukraine.

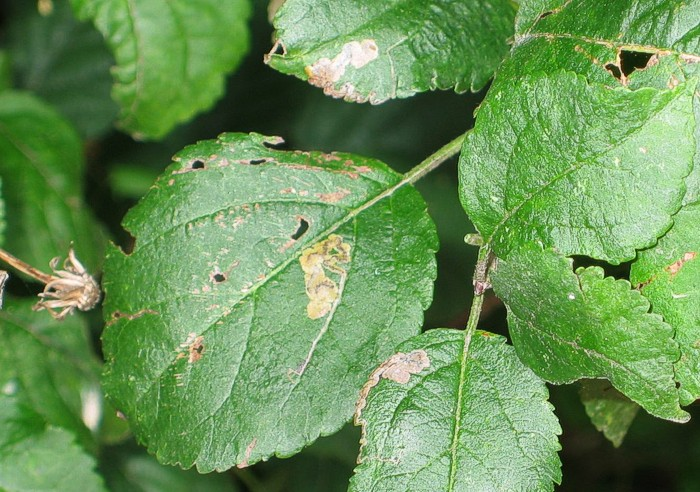
Damage

The wingspan is 4–5 mm. Adults are on wing in June.

The larvae feed on Malus baccata, Malus domestica, Malus sylvestris and Pyrus communis. They mine the leaves of their host plant.
