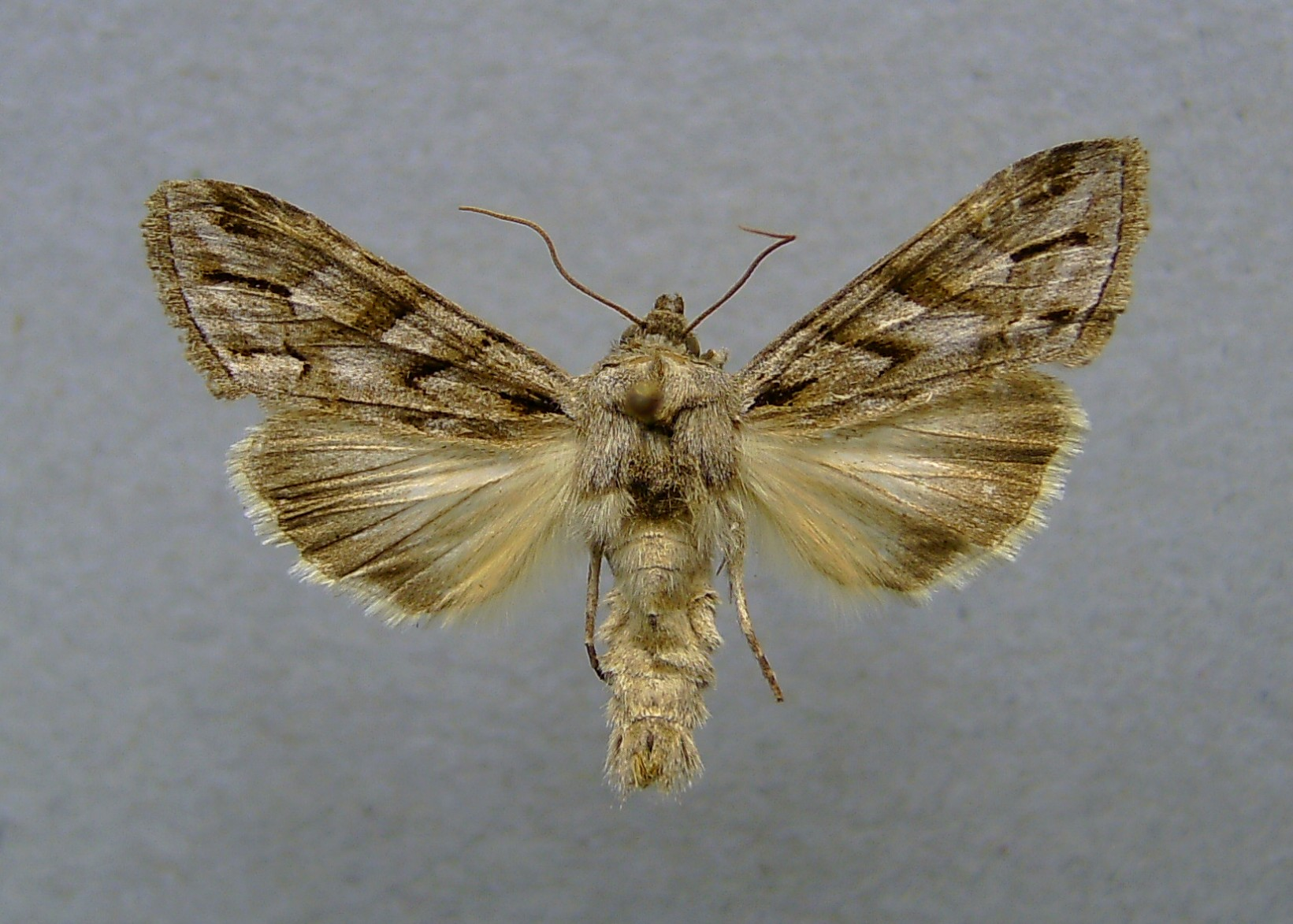

Scientific classification
- Domain: Eukaryota
- Kingdom: Animalia
- Phylum: Arthropoda
- Class: Insecta
- Order: Lepidoptera
- Superfamily: Noctuoidea
- Family: Noctuidae
- Genus: Cucullia
- Species: C. fraudatrix

Binomial name
- Cucullia fraudatrix Eversmann, 1837

Synonyms
- Cucullia pontica; Cucullia pyrethri

= Cucullia fraudatrix =

Species of moth

Cucullia fraudatrix is a species of moth of the family Noctuidae. It is found in the Eastern parts of Central Europe up to Korea and Japan and China.

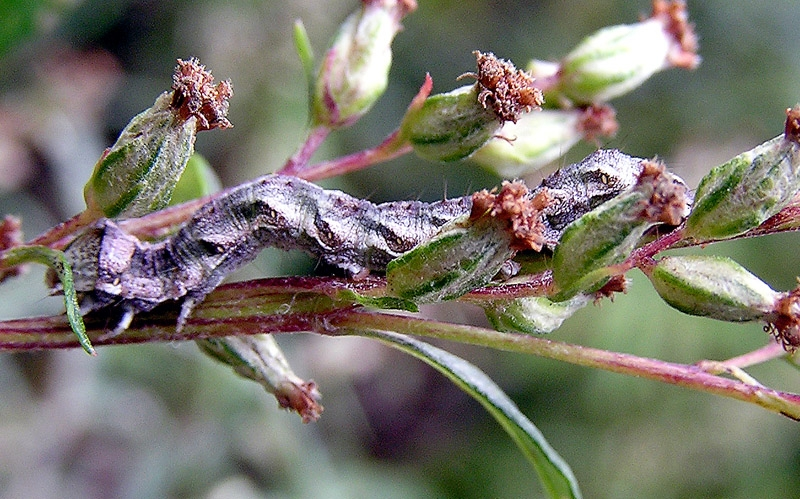
Caterpillar

The wingspan is 34–42 mm.

The larvae feed on Artemisia vulgaris.
