= Stigmella rhamnella =

Scientific classification
- Kingdom: Animalia
- Phylum: Arthropoda
- Class: Insecta
- Order: Lepidoptera
- Family: Nepticulidae
- Genus: Stigmella
- Species: S. rhamnella

Binomial name
- Stigmella rhamnella (Herrich-Schaffer, 1860)

Synonyms
- Nepticula rhamnella Herrich-Schaffer, 1860

Species of moth

Stigmella rhamnella is a moth of the family Nepticulidae. It is found from Denmark to the Iberian Peninsula and Italy and from France to Romania and Ukraine. It has also been recorded from Estonia. It is not on the southern part of Balkan Peninsula.

There are two to three generations per year.

The larvae feed on Rhamnus alpinus, Rhamnus catharticus, Rhamnus pumilus and Rhamnus saxatilis. They mine the leaves of their host plant.
