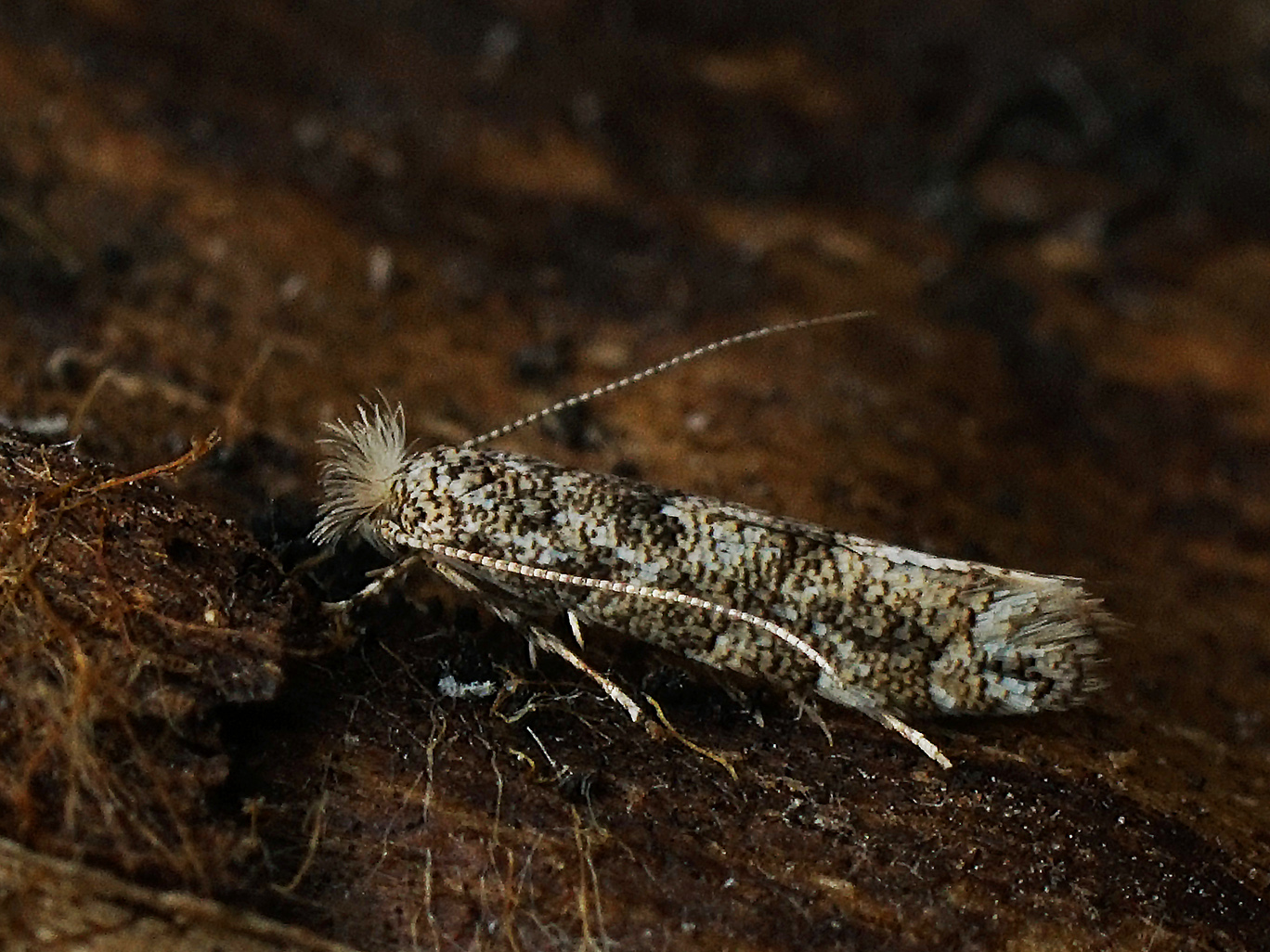

Scientific classification
- Domain: Eukaryota
- Kingdom: Animalia
- Phylum: Arthropoda
- Class: Insecta
- Order: Lepidoptera
- Family: Gracillariidae
- Genus: Phyllonorycter
- Species: P. populifoliella

Binomial name
- Phyllonorycter populifoliella (Treitschke, 1833)

Synonyms
- Elachista populifoliella Treitschke, 1833

= Phyllonorycter populifoliella =

Species of moth

Phyllonorycter populifoliella is a moth of the family Gracillariidae. It is known from all of Europe, except the British Isles.

Adults are on wing in two generations per year, from April to May and in again from August to September.

The larvae feed on Populus x canadensis, Populus deltoides, Populus euramericana and Populus nigra. They mine the leaves of their host plant. The pupa of the second generation hibernates.
