= Phyllonorycter joannisi =

Scientific classification
- Domain: Eukaryota
- Kingdom: Animalia
- Phylum: Arthropoda
- Class: Insecta
- Order: Lepidoptera
- Family: Gracillariidae
- Genus: Phyllonorycter
- Species: P. joannisi

Binomial name
- Phyllonorycter joannisi (Le Marchand, 1936)

Synonyms
- Lithocolletis joannisi Le Marchand, 1936; Lithocolletis platanoidella de Joannis, 1920; Phyllonorycter platanoidella

Species of moth

Phyllonorycter joannisi is a moth of the family Gracillariidae. It is found in most of Europe (except Ireland, the Iberian Peninsula and the Balkan Peninsula).

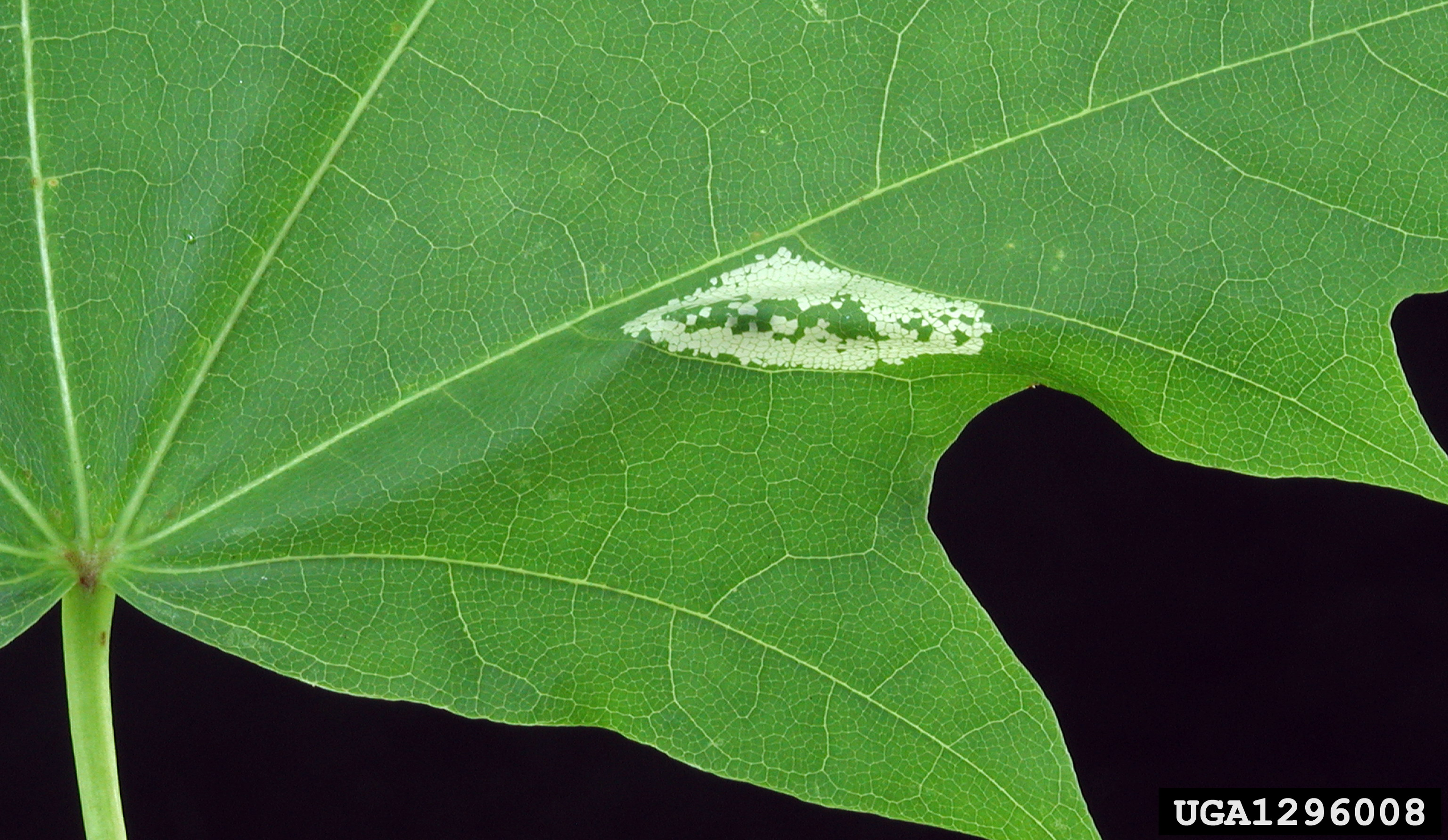
Damage

The wingspan is 6.5–9 mm. Adults are on wing in May and August in two generations.

The larvae feed on Norway maple (Acer platanoides), mining the leaves of their host plant.
