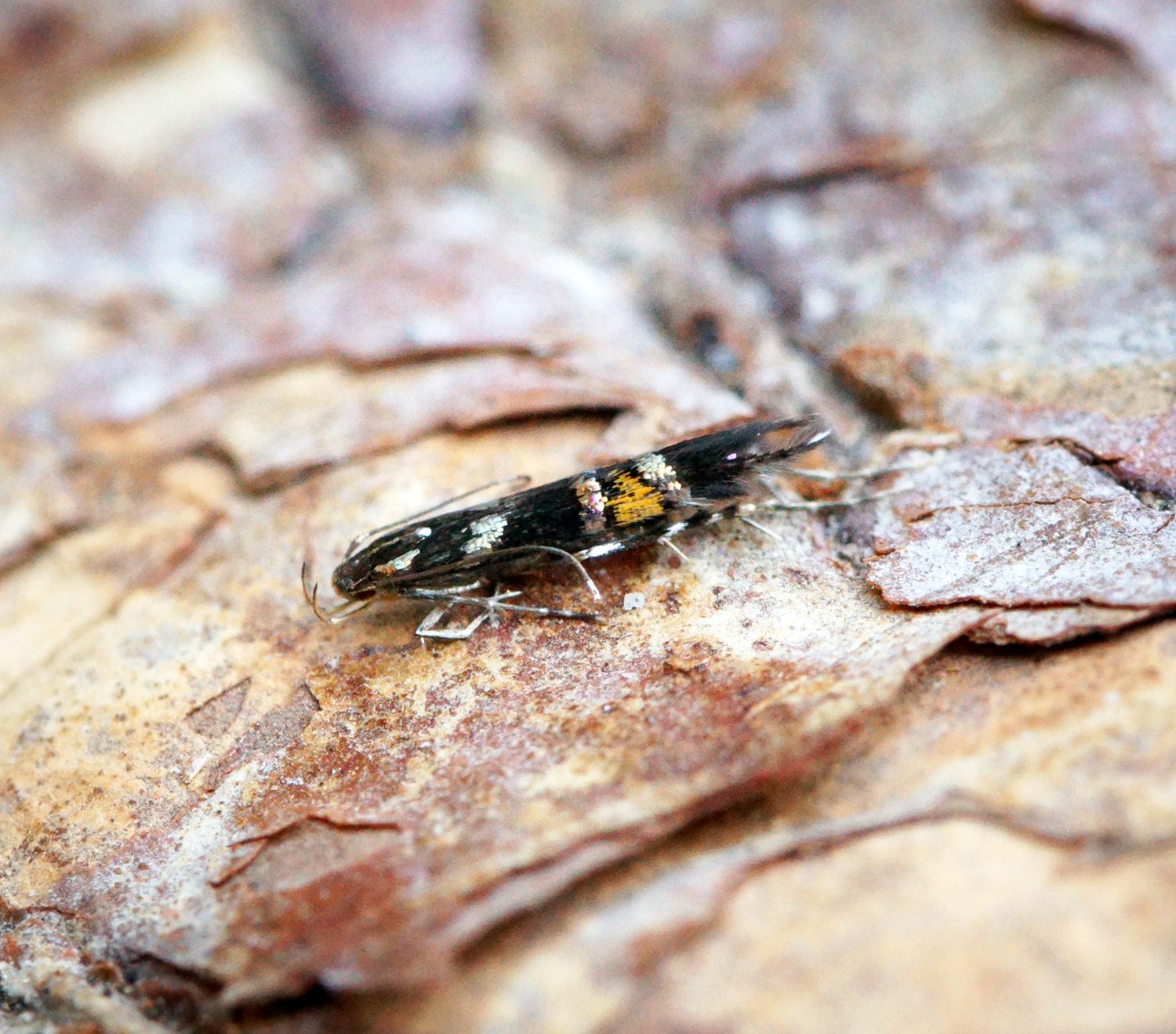

Scientific classification
- Kingdom: Animalia
- Phylum: Arthropoda
- Class: Insecta
- Order: Lepidoptera
- Family: Cosmopterigidae
- Genus: Cosmopterix
- Species: C. zieglerella

Binomial name
- Cosmopterix zieglerella (Hubner, 1810)

Synonyms
- Tinea zieglerella Hubner, 1810; Gracillaria eximia Haworth, 1828; Cosmopterix eximia (Haworth, 1828)

= Cosmopterix zieglerella =

Species of moth

Cosmopterix zieglerella is a moth of the family Cosmopterigidae. It is found from most of Europe (except Ireland and the Balkan Peninsula) east to Japan.

The wingspan is 8–11 mm. Adults are on wing in June and July.

The larvae feed on Humulus lupulus. They mine the leaves of their host plant.
