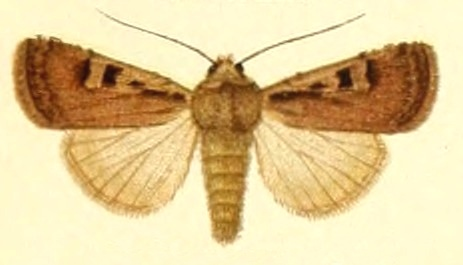
- Female
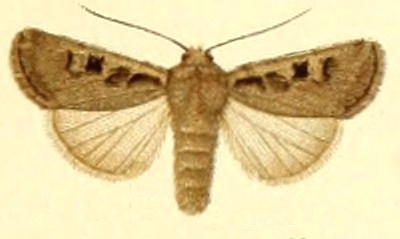
- Male

Scientific classification
- Kingdom: Animalia
- Phylum: Arthropoda
- Class: Insecta
- Order: Lepidoptera
- Superfamily: Noctuoidea
- Family: Noctuidae
- Genus: Euxoa
- Species: E. basigramma

Binomial name
- Euxoa basigramma (Staudinger, 1870)

Synonyms
- Agrotis basigramma Staudinger, 1870; Agrotis basigramma var. pallidior Wagner, 1913

= Euxoa basigramma =

Species of moth

Euxoa basigramma is a moth of the family Noctuidae. It is found in Turkey, Iran and from Ukraine, Moldova, northern, north-western, central, eastern and south-western Russia to Mongolia.
