= Phyllonorycter acaciella =

Scientific classification
- Domain: Eukaryota
- Kingdom: Animalia
- Phylum: Arthropoda
- Class: Insecta
- Order: Lepidoptera
- Family: Gracillariidae
- Genus: Phyllonorycter
- Species: P. acaciella

Binomial name
- Phyllonorycter acaciella (Duponchel, 1843)

Synonyms
- Elachista acaciella Duponchel, 1843

Species of moth

Phyllonorycter acaciella is a moth of the family Gracillariidae. It is found in southern Europe, but not on the Iberian Peninsula and Balkan Peninsula.

The larvae feed on Ulmus glabra, Ulmus laevis and Ulmus minor. They mine the leaves of their host plant.
