= Catocala hymenaea =

Scientific classification
- Kingdom: Animalia
- Phylum: Arthropoda
- Class: Insecta
- Order: Lepidoptera
- Superfamily: Noctuoidea
- Family: Erebidae
- Genus: Catocala
- Species: C. hymenaea

Binomial name
- Catocala hymenaea (Denis & Schiffermüller, 1775)

Synonyms
- Noctua hymenaea Denis & Schiffermüller, 1775; Noctua posthuma Hübner, 1813

Species of moth

Catocala hymenaea is a moth of the family Erebidae first described by Michael Denis and Ignaz Schiffermüller in 1775. It is found from the Middle East to western Asia.

There is one generation per year. Adults are on wing from May to July.

The larvae feed on Prunus species, including Prunus spinosa.
