= Stigmella lemniscella =

Scientific classification
- Kingdom: Animalia
- Phylum: Arthropoda
- Class: Insecta
- Order: Lepidoptera
- Family: Nepticulidae
- Genus: Stigmella
- Species: S. lemniscella

Binomial name
- Stigmella lemniscella (Zeller, 1839)

Synonyms
- Lyonetia lemniscella Zeller, 1839; Nepticula marginicolella Stainton, 1853; Nepticula suberosella Toll, 1934

Species of moth

Stigmella lemniscella is a moth of the family Nepticulidae. It is found in most of Europe.

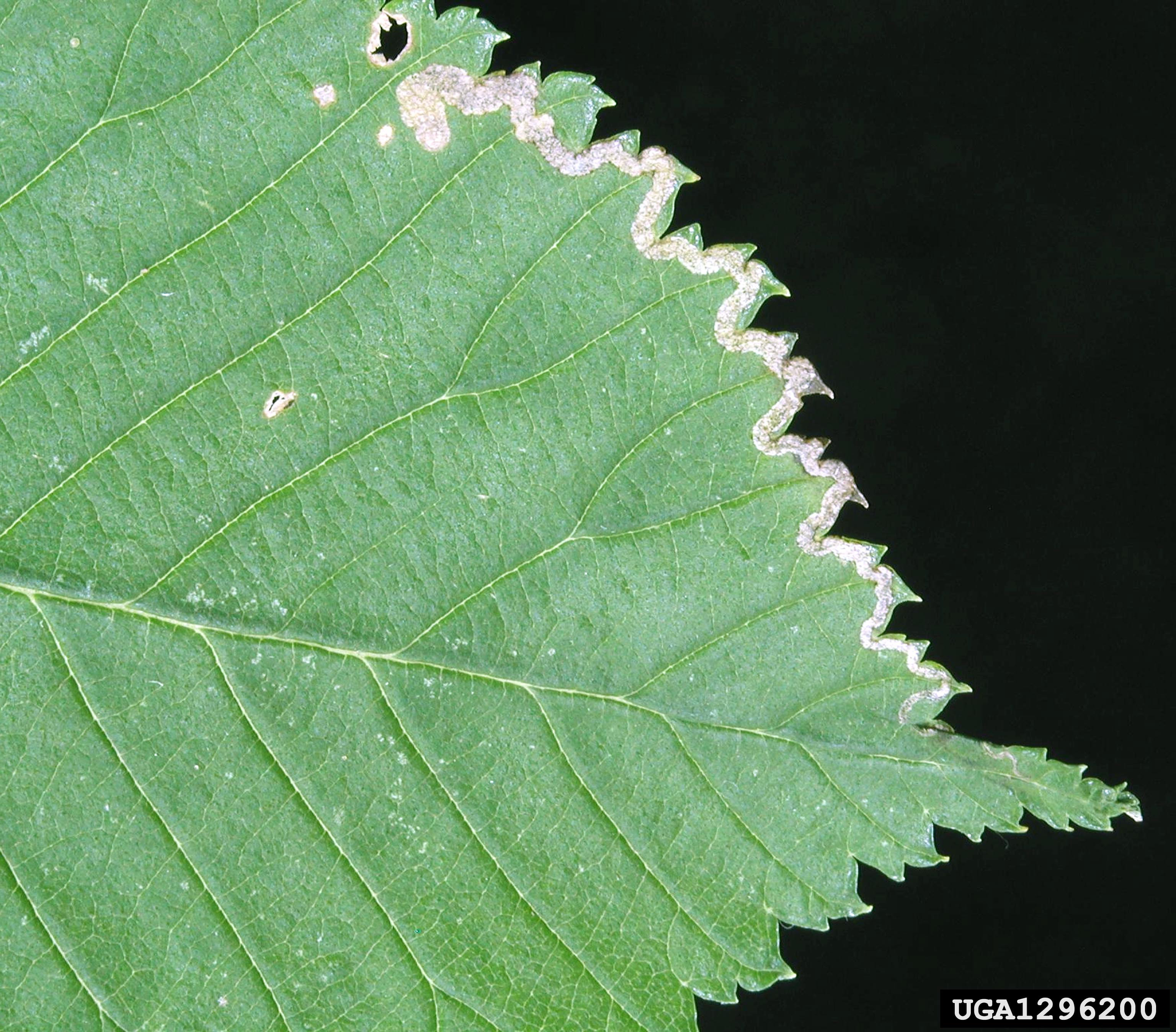
Stigmella lemniscella mine

The wingspan is 5 to 6 millimetres (0.20 to 0.24 in).The head in male is black, in female orange, collar blackish. The antennal eyecaps whitish. The forewings are shining brownish-golden with a somewhat oblique shining silvery fascia beyond middle, preceded by a brownish-purple suffusion. The apical area beyond this is dark purple-fuscous. The hindwings are dark fuscous.

Adults are on wing from May to August. There are two generations per year.

The larvae feed on Ulmus glabra, Ulmus laevis, Ulmus minor and Ulmus pumila. They mine the leaves of their host plant.
