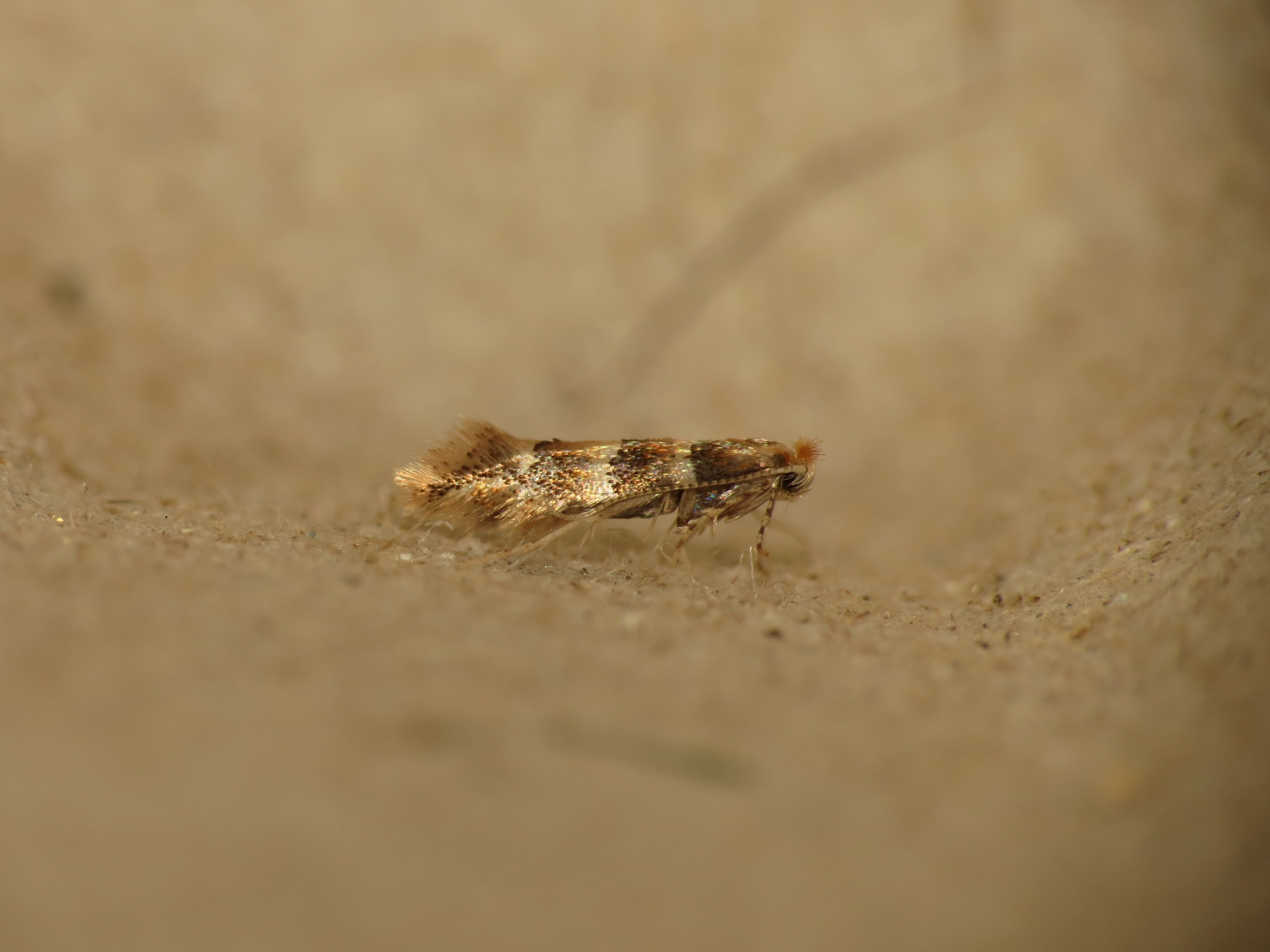

Scientific classification
- Domain: Eukaryota
- Kingdom: Animalia
- Phylum: Arthropoda
- Class: Insecta
- Order: Lepidoptera
- Family: Gracillariidae
- Genus: Phyllonorycter
- Species: P. tristrigella

Binomial name
- Phyllonorycter tristrigella (Haworth, 1828)

Synonyms
- Tinea tristrigella Haworth, 1828; Lithocolletis tristrigella

= Phyllonorycter tristrigella =

Species of moth

Phyllonorycter tristrigella is a moth of the family Gracillariidae. It is known from all of Europe, except the Iberian Peninsula and the Balkan Peninsula, east to the European part of Russia. It was also recorded from Japan, but this is a misidentification of Phyllonorycter laciniatae.

The wingspan is 7–9 mm (0.28–0.35 in). There are two generations per year with adults on wing in May and again in August.

The larvae feed on Ulmus glabra, Ulmus x hollandica, Ulmus laevis and Ulmus minor, mining the leaves.
