= Eogena =

Scientific classification
- Kingdom: Animalia
- Phylum: Arthropoda
- Class: Insecta
- Order: Lepidoptera
- Superfamily: Noctuoidea
- Family: Noctuidae
- Subfamily: Acronictinae
- Genus: Eogena; Guenée in Boisduval & Guenée, 1852
- Species: E. contaminei

Binomial name
- Eogena contaminei (Eversmann, 1847)

Synonyms
- Noctua contaminei Eversmann, 1847; Cosmia bombycina Ménétriés, 1849; Noctua eogene Freyer, 1852

Genus of moths

Eogena is a monotypic moth genus of the family Noctuidae erected by Achille Guenée in 1852. Its only species, Eogena contaminei, was first described by Eduard Friedrich Eversmann in 1847. It is found in southern Russia, Turkey, Transcaucasia and Central Asia.
