= Lampra =

Lampra may refer to:

- Lampra - synonym of moth genus Noctua
- Lampra Lacordaire in Boisduval & Lacordaire, 1835 - a genus of beetles in the family Buprestidae - see Lamprodila
- Lampra {Lindl. ex DC. – see Trachymene Rudge, Trans. Linn. Soc. London 10: 300. t. 21. 7 Sep (1811)
- Lampra Benth., Pl. Hartw.: 95 (1842) – see Weldenia Schult.f., Flora 12: 3 (1829)
