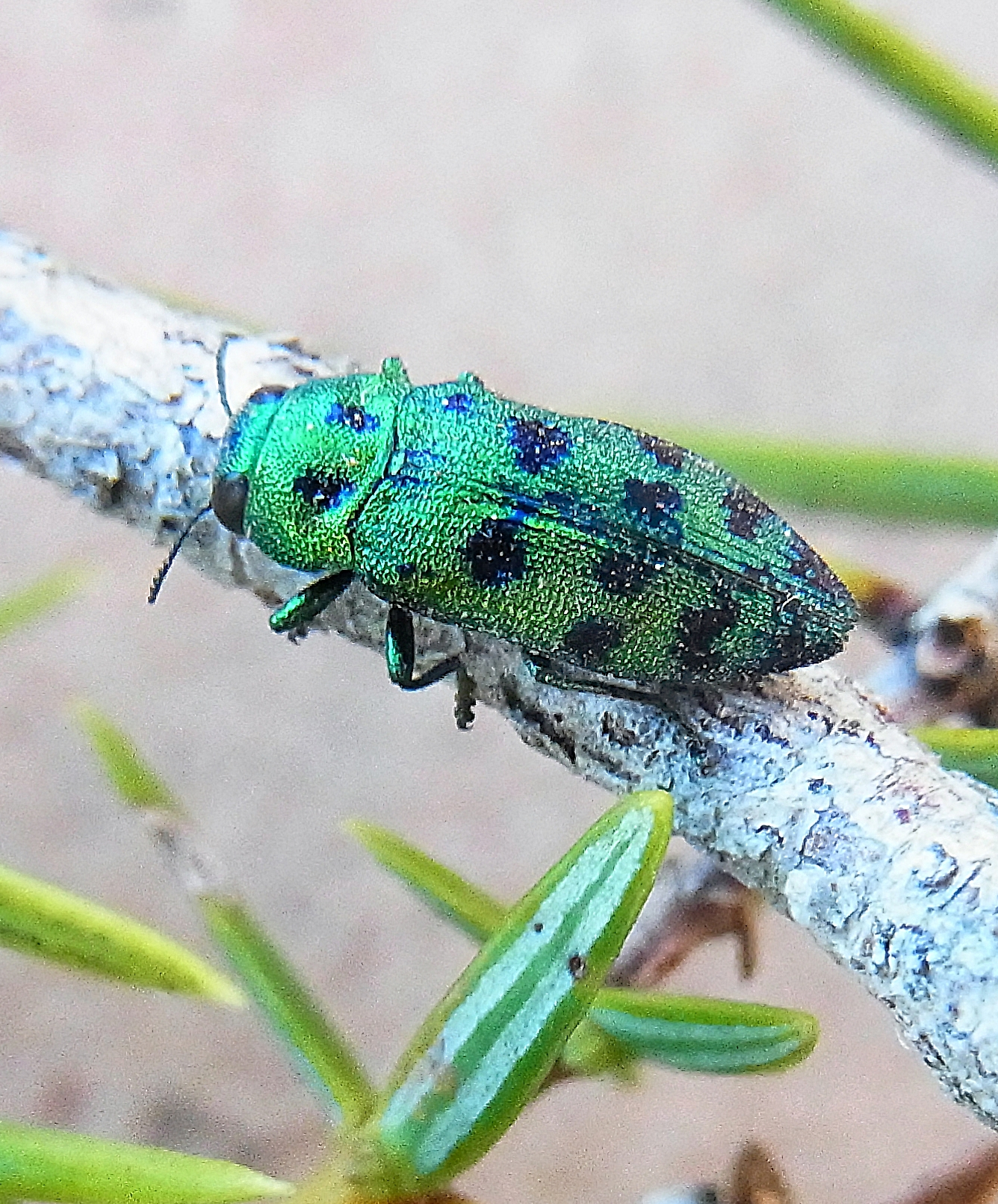

Scientific classification
- Kingdom: Animalia
- Phylum: Arthropoda
- Clade: Pancrustacea
- Class: Insecta
- Order: Coleoptera
- Suborder: Polyphaga
- Infraorder: Elateriformia
- Family: Buprestidae
- Genus: Lamprodila
- Species: L. festiva

Binomial name
- Lamprodila festiva (Linnaeus, 1767)

Synonyms
- List: Buprestis decemmaculata Rossi, 1792; Buprestis decempunctata Fabricius, 1798; Buprestis festiva Linnaeus, 1767; Lampra bonnairei Fairmaire, 1884; Lampra caerulans Hoschek, 1929; Lamprodila bonnairei (Fairmaire, 1884); Lamprodila decemmaculata (Rossi, 1792); Lamprodila decempunctata (Fabricius, 1798); Ovalisia festiva (Linnaeus, 1767); Palmar festiva (Linnaeus, 1767); Scintillatrix festiva (Linnaeus, 1767)

= Lamprodila festiva =

Species of beetle

Lamprodila festiva, known as the juniper jewel beetle, is a European species of metallic wood-boring beetles associated with Cupressaceae trees. It is native to the Mediterranean region and during the 21st century, it has been rapidly spreading northward. It is considered a serious invasive pest of ornamental conifers.

== Description ==
The adult beetles are 6-12 mm long, metallic green with steel blue spots on the shield and elytra. The legless larvae are 15-20 mm long, cream colored, with strongly sclerotized mandibles and a strongly broadened anterior part of the thoracic segment.

== Distribution ==
The species is native to North Africa (Morocco, Algeria, Tunisia, Libya), Mediterannean Europe (Spain, France, Italy, Croatia, Greece, etc.), and Mediterannean West Asia (Turkey, Lebanon). Starting in early 2000s, it has been observed in more northerly locations across Europe and by 2020s, it has reached as far north as Belgium, Czechia, Poland, and Ukraine. Its spread is likely connected to climate change.

== See also ==
- Lamprodila rutilans
- Emerald ash borer
