= Hyon (disambiguation) =

Hyon may refer to:

- Hyon, village in Mons, Belgium
- Hyeon, historical administrative subdivisions of Korea
- Hyon (Korean name), Korean family name and given name
