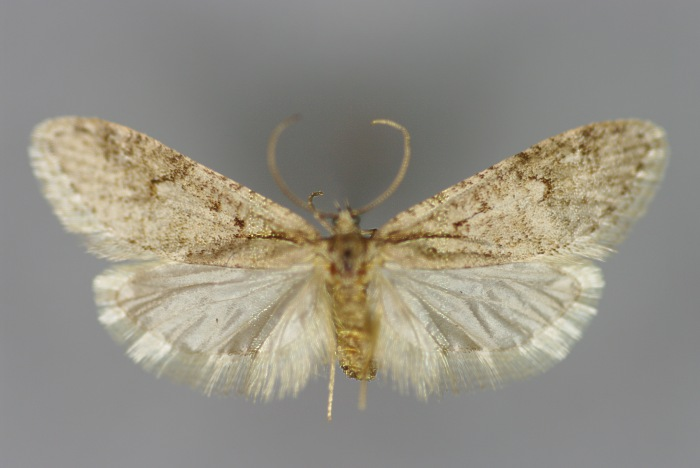

Scientific classification
- Kingdom: Animalia
- Phylum: Arthropoda
- Class: Insecta
- Order: Lepidoptera
- Family: Depressariidae
- Genus: Semioscopis
- Species: S. avellanella

Binomial name
- Semioscopis avellanella (Hubner, 1793)

Synonyms
- Phalaena avellanella Hubner, 1793; Semioscopis fumicella Amsel, 1930

= Semioscopis avellanella =

Species of moth

Semioscopis avellanella is a species of moth of the family Depressariidae. It is found in most of Europe (except most of the Balkan Peninsula and the Iberian Peninsula ) east to the eastern parts of the Palearctic realm.

The wingspan is 20–26 mm. The forewings are rosy-grey whitish, sprinkled with pale fuscous; a dark fuscous streak from base along fold to 1/3, thence bent upwards to disc before middle; second discal stigma forming a dark fuscous angulated mark; some dark fuscous scales tending to form dots on costa and termen; 2 and 3 separate. Hindwings are pale greyish. The larva is whitish-green; dorsal line darker; head and plate of 2 green.

Adults are on wing from March to April.

The larvae feed on Betula, Tilia (including Tilia cordata) and Carpinus species.
