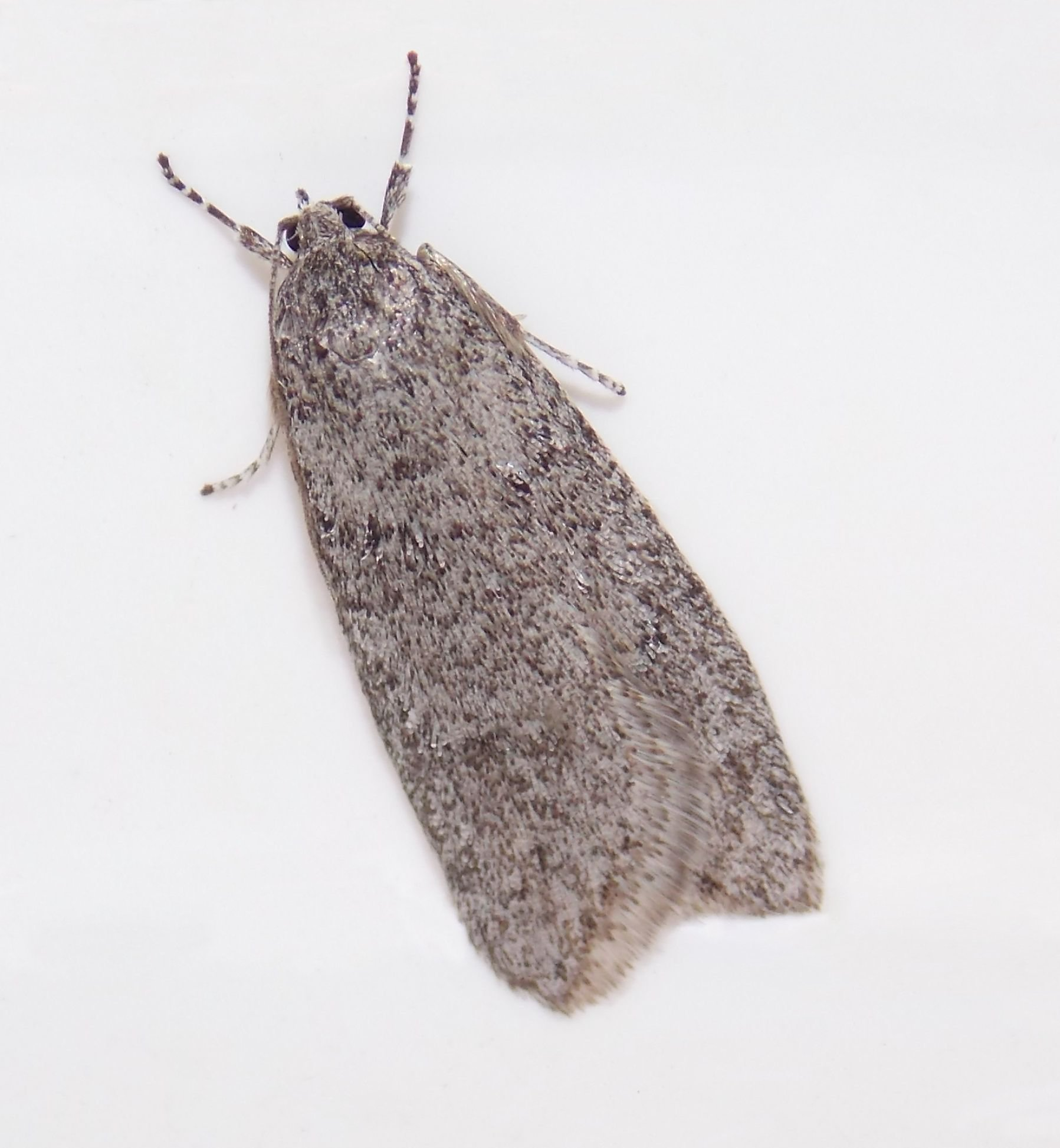

Scientific classification
- Domain: Eukaryota
- Kingdom: Animalia
- Phylum: Arthropoda
- Class: Insecta
- Order: Lepidoptera
- Family: Depressariidae
- Genus: Semioscopis
- Species: S. inornata

Binomial name
- Semioscopis inornata Walsingham, 1882

= Semioscopis inornata =

Dull flatbody moth

Species of moth

Semioscopis inornata, the dull flatbody moth, is a species of moth of the family Depressariidae. It was described by Thomas de Grey, 6th Baron Walsingham, in 1882. It is found throughout Canada and northern United States.

The length of the forewings is 10.5–15 mm. The forewings are bluish-gray. Adults are on wing from early April to the end of May in one generation per year.

The larvae feed on Populus tremuloides, Populus grandidentata, Populus balsamifera and Salix species. They roll the leaves of their host plant.
