= Hyon =

Sub-municipality of the city of Mons, Belgium

Hyon Iyon (Picard)
- Sub-municipality of Mons
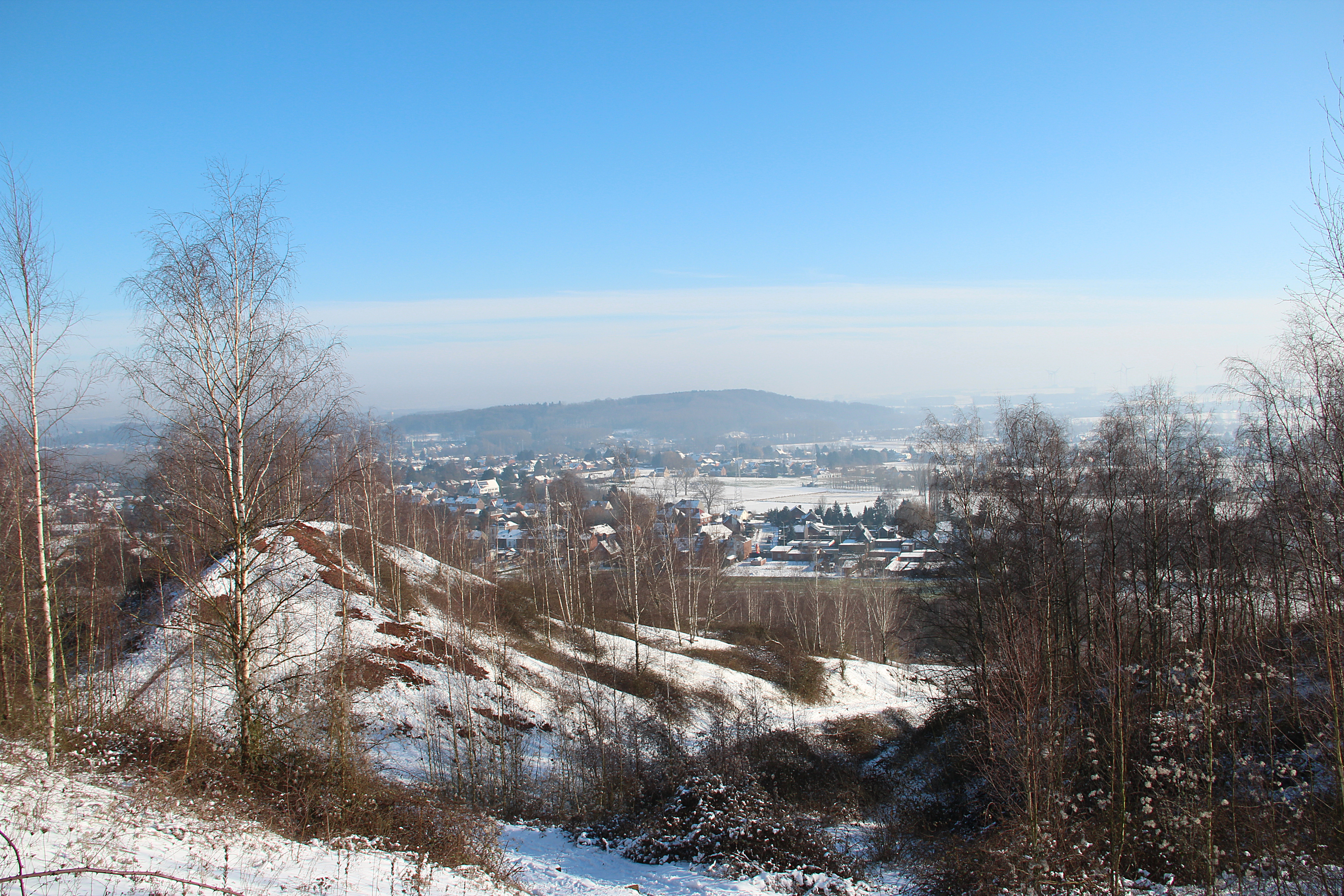

- Coat of arms

- Location of Hyon in Mons
- Interactive map of Hyon
- Location within Belgium Location within Hainaut (Belgium)
- Coordinates: 50°26′21″N 3°57′43″E
- Country: Belgium
- Community: French Community
- Region: Wallonia
- Province: Hainaut
- Arrondissement: Mons
- Municipality: Mons

Area
  - Total: 3.67 km^{2} (1.42 sq mi)

Population (2020-01-01)
  - Total: 4,099
  - Density: 1,120/km^{2} (2,890/sq mi)
- Postal codes: 7022
- Area codes: 065

Hyon (French pronunciation: [jɔ̃]; Picard: Iyon) is a sub-municipality of the city of Mons located in the province of Hainaut, Wallonia, Belgium. It was a separate municipality until 1972. On 1 January 1972, it was merged into Mons.

== Gallery ==
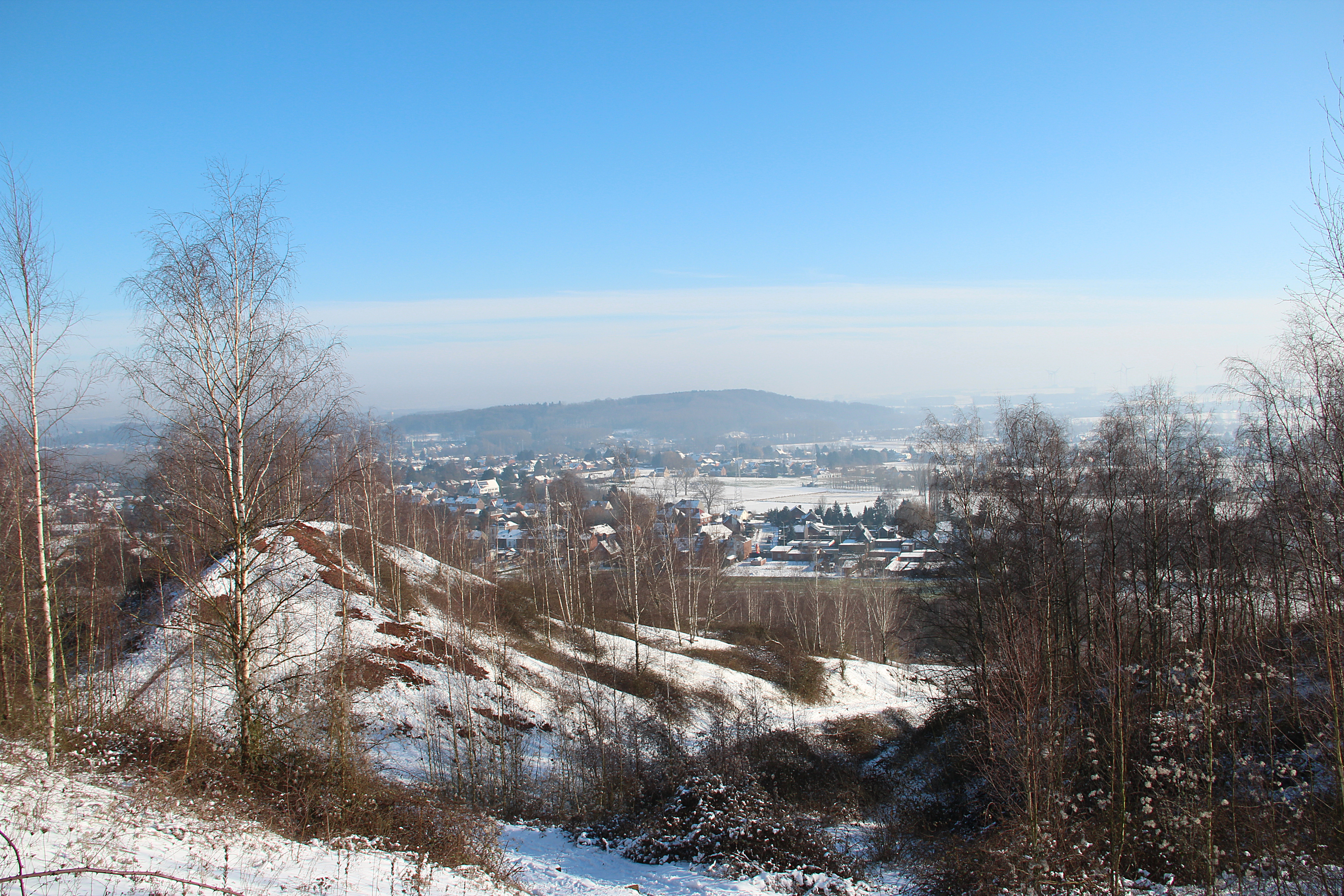
The village seen from the summit of Mount Héribus.

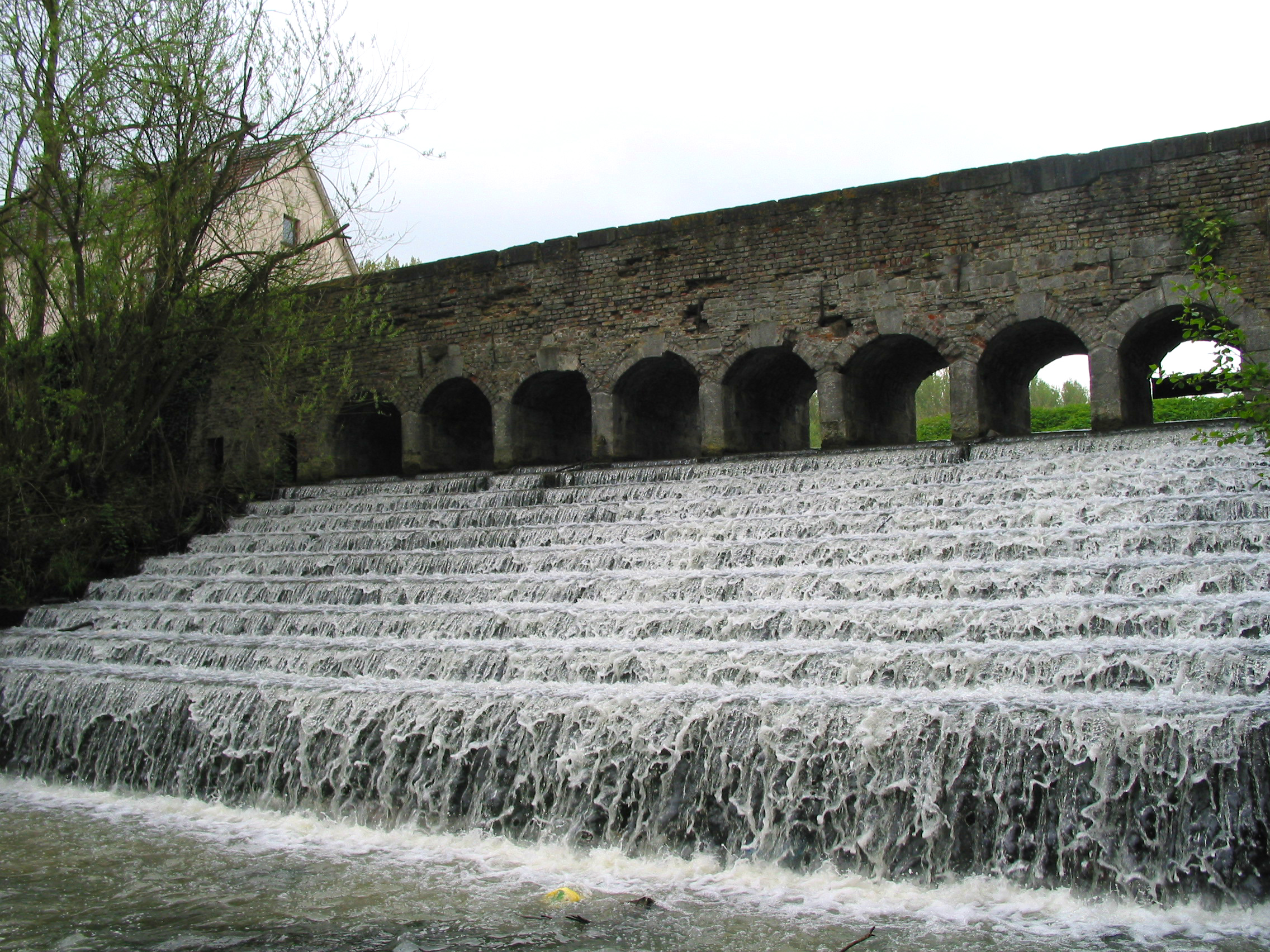
Bridge/Dam on the river la Trouille (16th century).

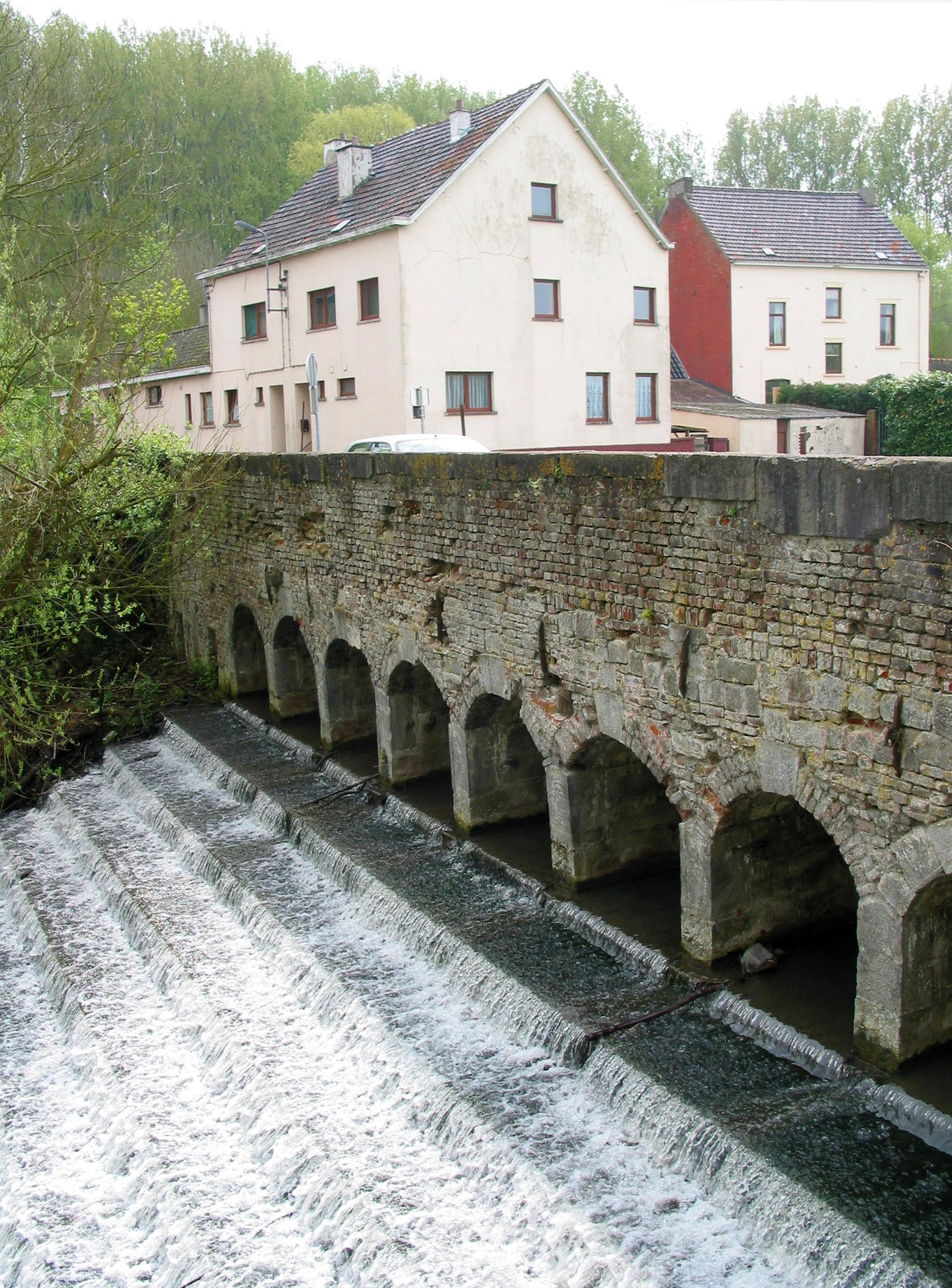
Bridge/Dam.

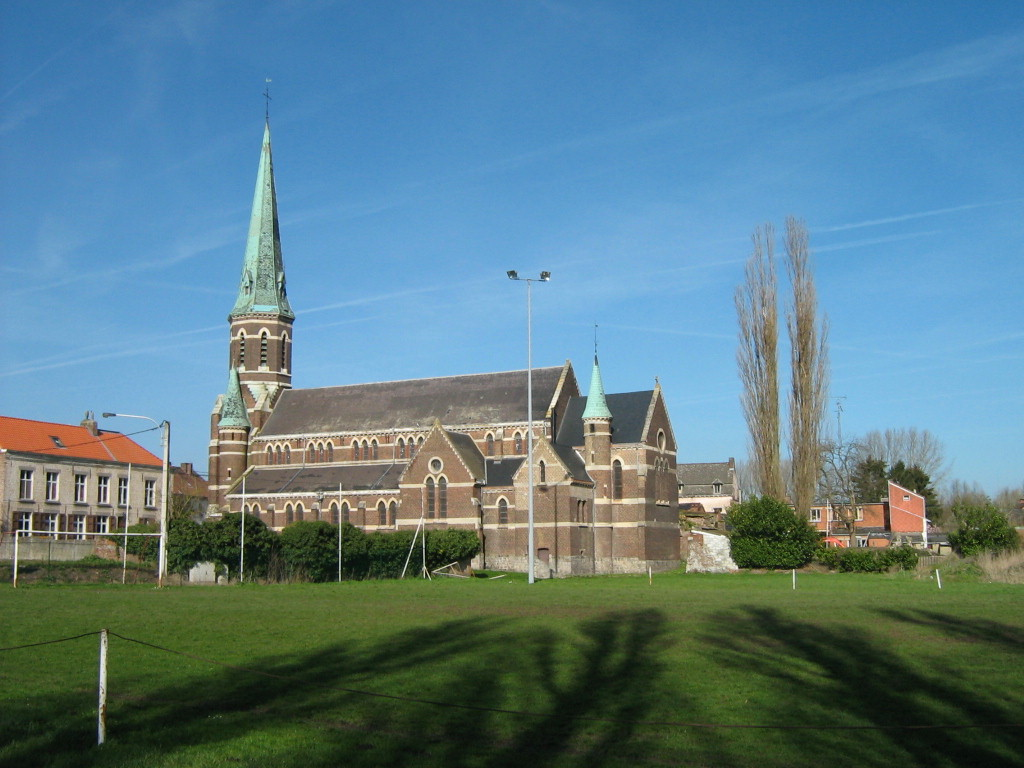
Church Saint-Martin (1874-1876).

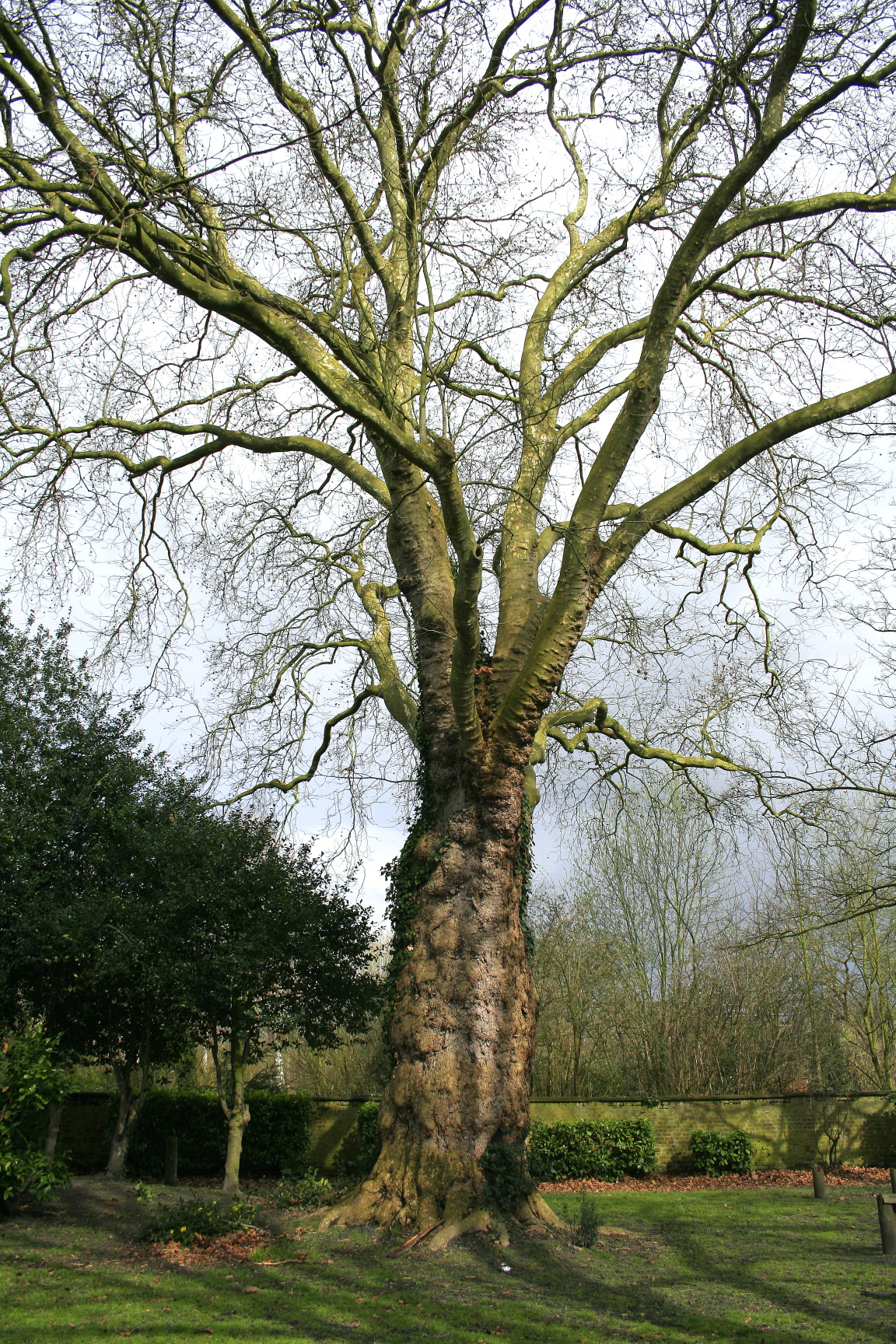
Remarkable hybrid plane of the common park.

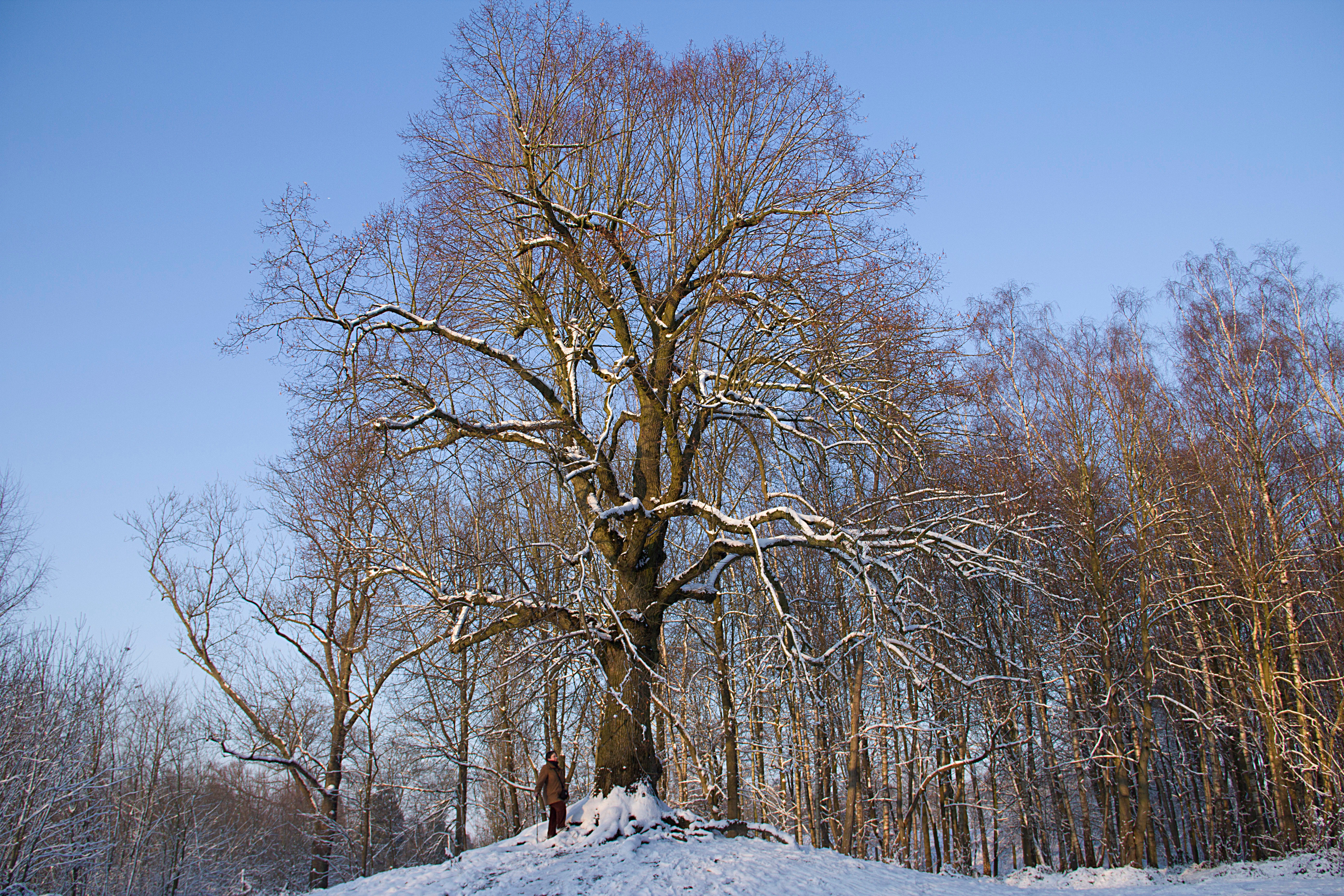
The Liberty Tree - Common Lime planted in the end of the 18th century.
