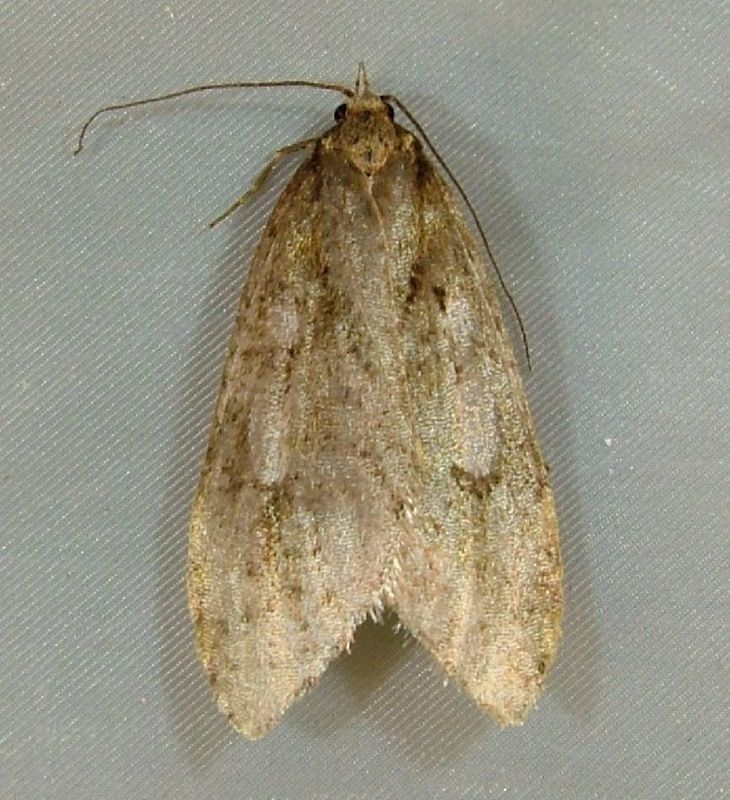

Scientific classification
- Kingdom: Animalia
- Phylum: Arthropoda
- Clade: Pancrustacea
- Class: Insecta
- Order: Lepidoptera
- Family: Depressariidae
- Genus: Semioscopis
- Species: S. mcdunnoughi

Binomial name
- Semioscopis mcdunnoughi Clarke, 1941

= Semioscopis mcdunnoughi =

Species of moth

Semioscopis mcdunnoughi is a species of moth of the family Depressariidae. It was described by John Frederick Gates Clarke in 1941. It is found in western North America, including Washington and British Columbia.
