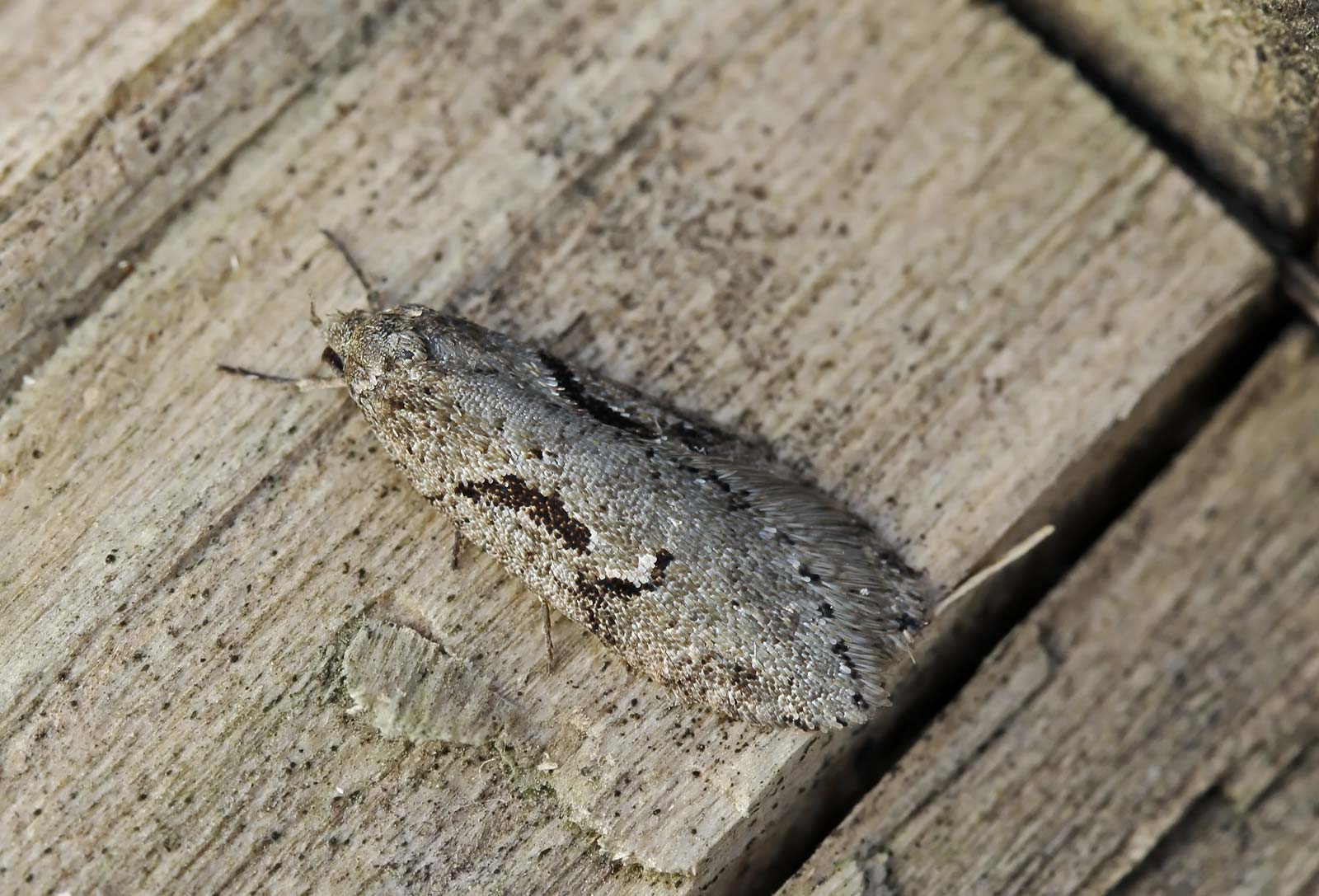

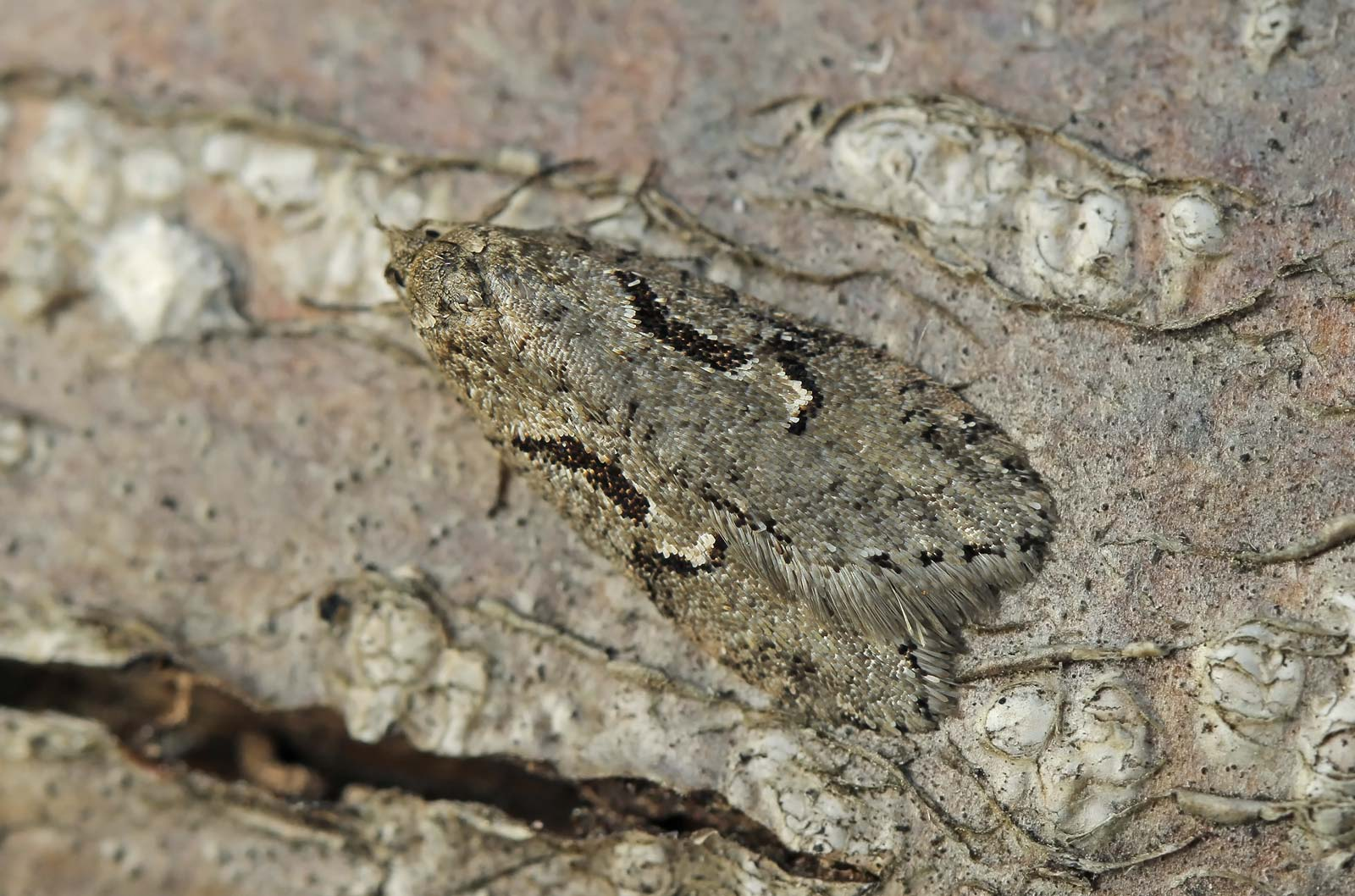

Scientific classification
- Kingdom: Animalia
- Phylum: Arthropoda
- Clade: Pancrustacea
- Class: Insecta
- Order: Lepidoptera
- Family: Depressariidae
- Genus: Semioscopis
- Species: S. steinkellneriana

Binomial name
- Semioscopis steinkellneriana (Denis & Schiffermüller, 1775)

Synonyms
- Tortrix steinkellneriana Denis & Schiffermüller, 1775; Phalaena characterella Hübner, 1793; Semioscopis steinkellnerella Hübner, [1825]; Depressaria characterosa Haworth, 1811

= Semioscopis steinkellneriana =

Species of moth

Semioscopis steinkellneriana is a species of moth of the family Depressariidae. It is found from most of Europe (except the southern part of the Balkan Peninsula and Portugal) east to the eastern parts of the Palearctic realm.

The wingspan is 19–25 mm. The forewings are light brown, sometimes rosy-tinged, with a few dark fuscous scales; a small black subcostal dot near base; a bent blackish longitudinal mark in disc before middle; second discal stigma forming an angulated blackish transverse mark, connected with a fuscous spot on costa; 2 and 3 stalked. Hindwings are light grey. The larva is whitish-green; dorsal line darker; head and plate of 2 black-marked.

Adults are on wing in April and fly very early in the morning.

The larvae feed on Prunus spinosa, Crataegus, Cotoneaster, Fraxinus and Sorbus species. They live within a spun or rolled leaf and overwinter as a pupa.
