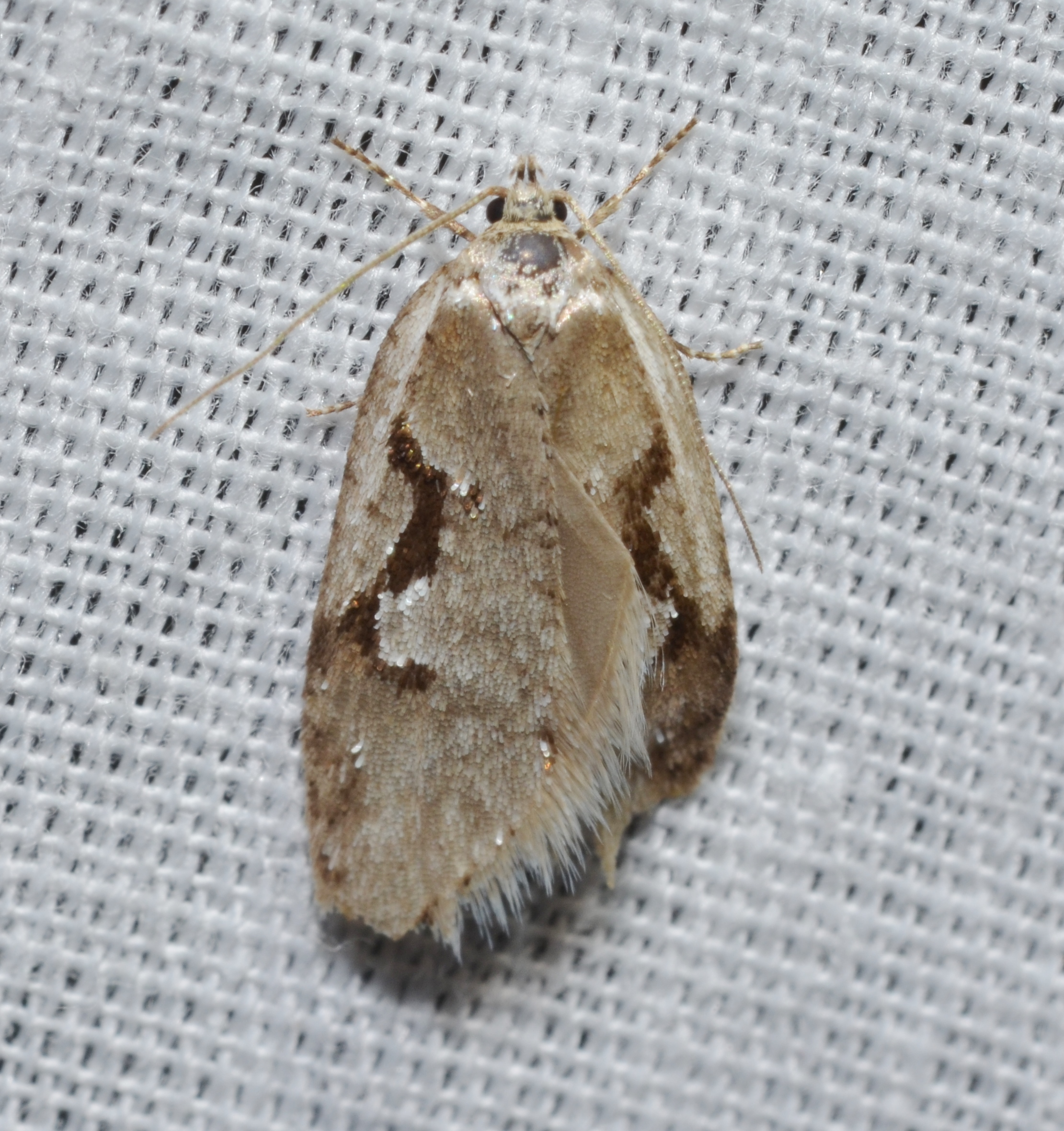

Scientific classification
- Kingdom: Animalia
- Phylum: Arthropoda
- Class: Insecta
- Order: Lepidoptera
- Family: Depressariidae
- Genus: Semioscopis
- Species: S. merriccella

Binomial name
- Semioscopis merriccella Dyar, 1902

Synonyms
- Semioscopis merrickella Meyrick, 1922

= Semioscopis merriccella =

Species of moth

Semioscopis merriccella is a species of moth of the family Depressariidae. It was described by Harrison Gray Dyar Jr. in 1902. It is found throughout the northern United States and southern Canada from the east to the west coast.

The length of the forewings is 11–15 mm. Adults are on wing from mid-March to the end of May. There is probably one generation per year.
