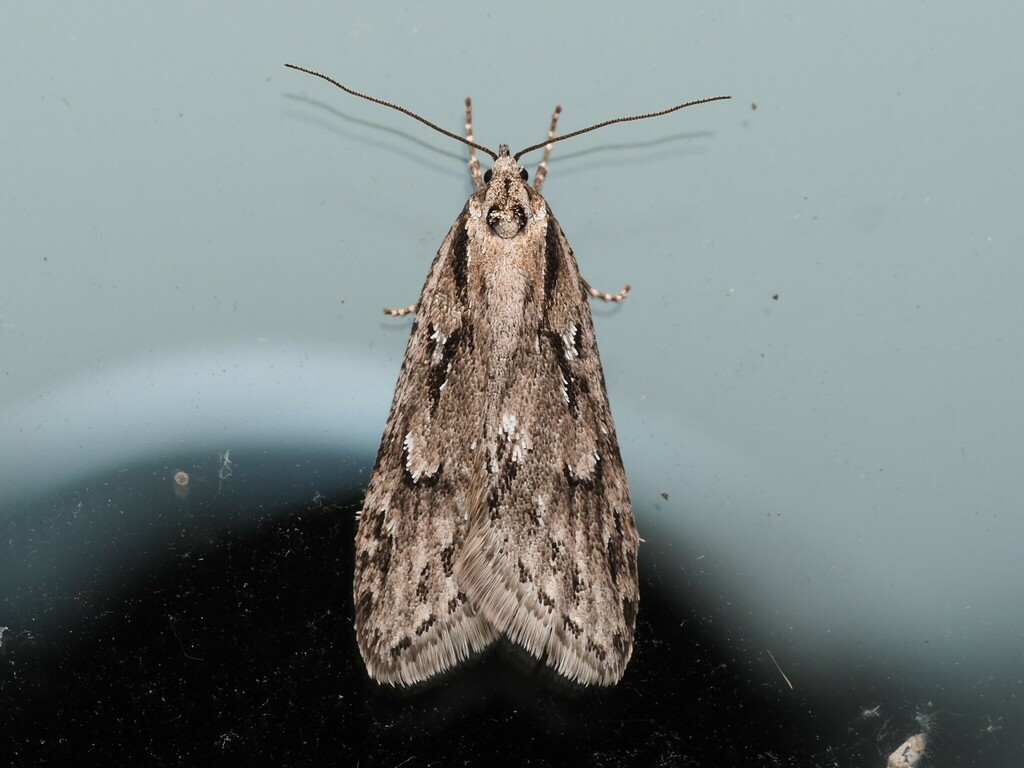

Scientific classification
- Kingdom: Animalia
- Phylum: Arthropoda
- Clade: Pancrustacea
- Class: Insecta
- Order: Lepidoptera
- Family: Depressariidae
- Genus: Semioscopis
- Species: S. aurorella

Binomial name
- Semioscopis aurorella Dyar, 1902

= Semioscopis aurorella =

Species of moth

Semioscopis aurorella, the aurora flatbody moth, is a species of moth of the family Depressariidae. It was described by Harrison Gray Dyar Jr. in 1902. It is found in Canada from north-central Alberta to south-eastern Ontario, south into the United States between south-central New York and Wisconsin.

The length of the forewings is 11–14 mm.
