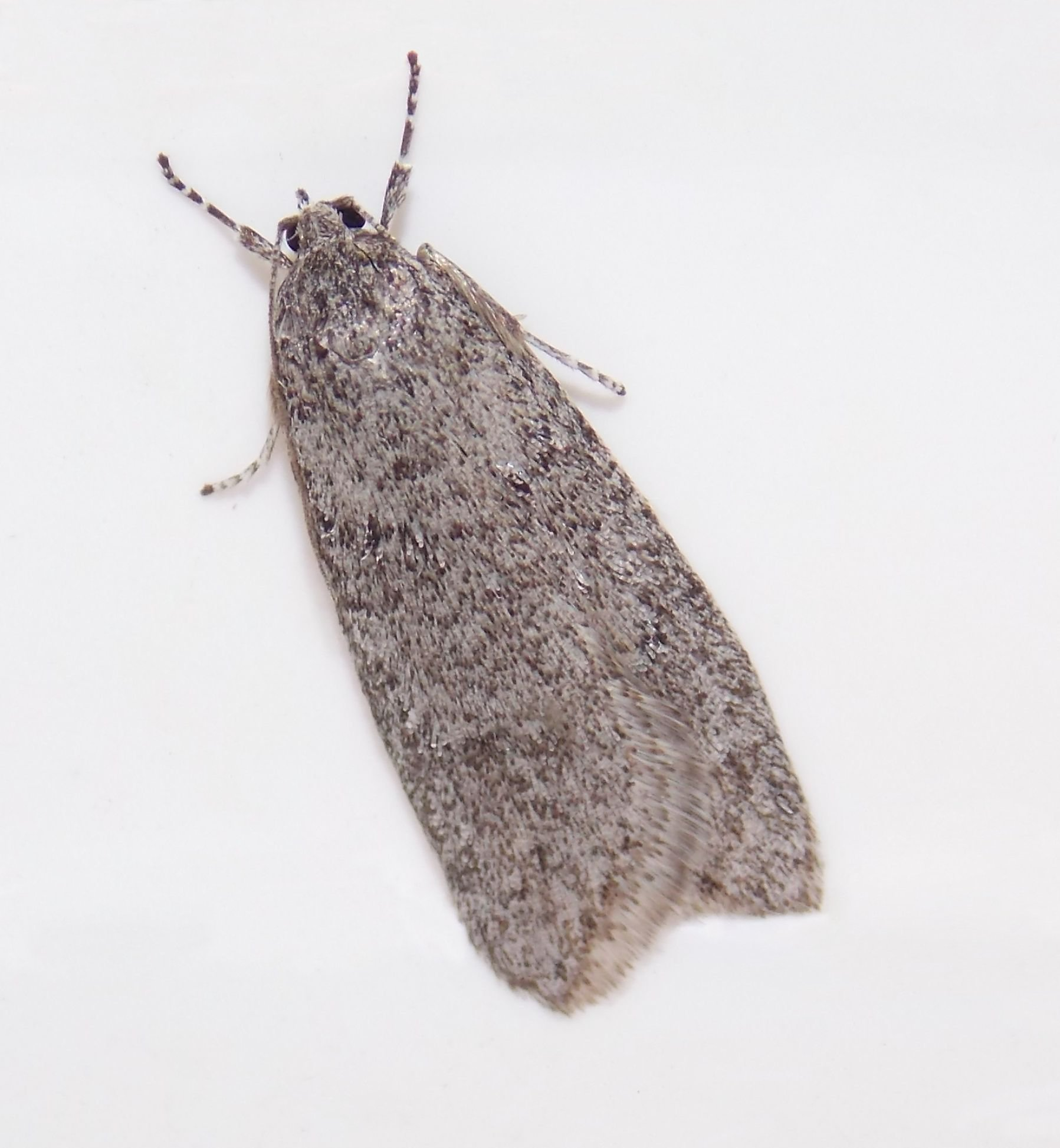

Scientific classification
- Kingdom: Animalia
- Phylum: Arthropoda
- Clade: Pancrustacea
- Class: Insecta
- Order: Lepidoptera
- Family: Depressariidae
- Subfamily: Depressariinae
- Genus: Semioscopis; Hübner, 1825

Type species
- "Tortrix steinkellneriana" Denis & Schiffermüller, 1775

Synonyms
- Epigraphia Stephens, 1829

= Semioscopis =

Genus of moths

Semioscopis is a moth genus of the superfamily Gelechioidea. It is placed in the subfamily Depressariinae.

== Species ==
- Semioscopis aurorella Dyar, 1902
- Semioscopis avellanella (Hubner, 1793)
- Semioscopis inornata Walsingham, 1882
- Semioscopis japonicella Sato, 1989
- Semioscopis mcdunnoughi Clarke, 1941
- Semioscopis megamicrella Dyar, 1902
- Semioscopis merriccella Dyar, 1902
- Semioscopis oculella (Thunberg, 1794)
- Semioscopis osthelderi (Rebel, 1936)
- Semioscopis packardella (Clemens, 1863)
- Semioscopis similis Sato, 1989
- Semioscopis steinkellneriana (Denis & Schiffermuller, 1775)
- Semioscopis strigulana (Denis & Schiffermuller, 1775)

== Former species ==
- Semioscopis acertella Busck, 1913
