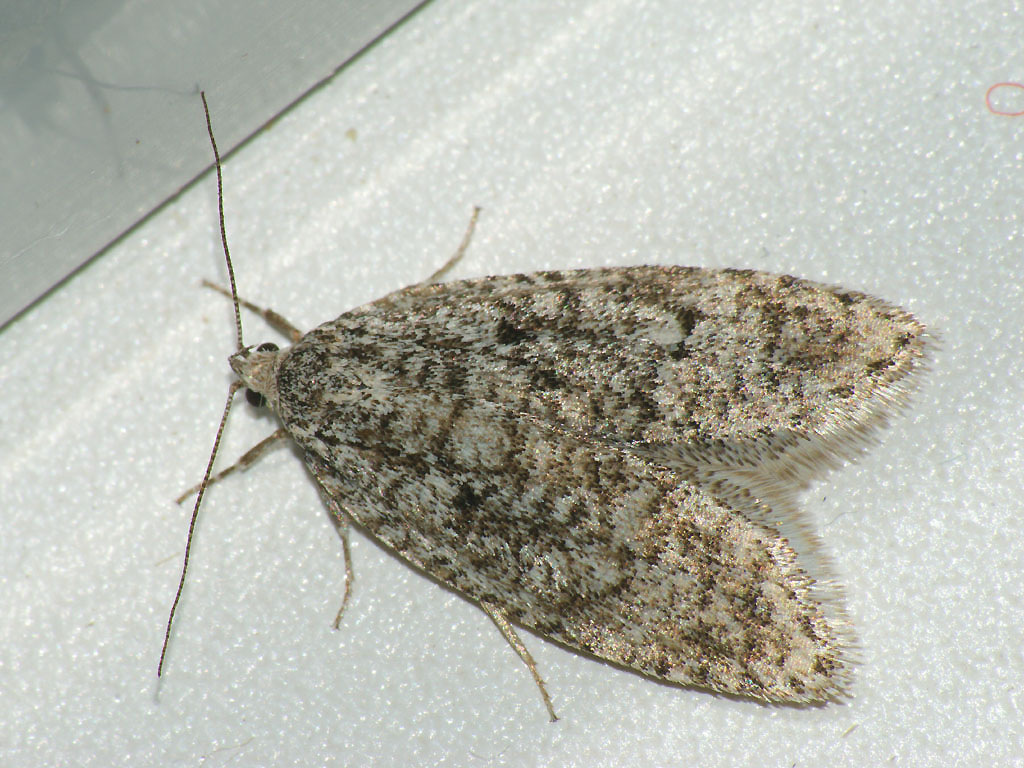

Scientific classification
- Domain: Eukaryota
- Kingdom: Animalia
- Phylum: Arthropoda
- Class: Insecta
- Order: Lepidoptera
- Family: Depressariidae
- Genus: Semioscopis
- Species: S. strigulana

Binomial name
- Semioscopis strigulana (Fabricius, 1787)

Synonyms
- Tortrix strigulana Fabricius, 1787; Tinea atomella Hübner, 1796 (preocc.); Chimabache consimilella Hübner, [1825]

= Semioscopis strigulana =

Species of moth

Semioscopis strigulana is a species of moth of the family Depressariidae. It is found in most of Europe (except most of the Balkan Peninsula, the Iberian Peninsula, Great Britain, Ireland, the Benelux, and Denmark) east to the eastern parts of the Palearctic realm.

The wingspan is 26–32 mm.

The larvae feed on Populus tremula.
