= Semioscopis japonicella =

Scientific classification
- Domain: Eukaryota
- Kingdom: Animalia
- Phylum: Arthropoda
- Class: Insecta
- Order: Lepidoptera
- Family: Depressariidae
- Genus: Semioscopis
- Species: S. japonicella

Binomial name
- Semioscopis japonicella Sato, 1989

Species of moth

Semioscopis japonicella is a moth in the family Depressariidae. It was described by Sato in 1989. It is found in Japan.
