= Semioscopis similis =

Scientific classification
- Domain: Eukaryota
- Kingdom: Animalia
- Phylum: Arthropoda
- Class: Insecta
- Order: Lepidoptera
- Family: Depressariidae
- Genus: Semioscopis
- Species: S. similis

Binomial name
- Semioscopis similis Sato, 1989

Species of moth

Semioscopis similis is a moth in the family Depressariidae. It was described by Sato in 1989. It is found in Japan.
