= Semioscopis osthelderi =

Scientific classification
- Domain: Eukaryota
- Kingdom: Animalia
- Phylum: Arthropoda
- Class: Insecta
- Order: Lepidoptera
- Family: Depressariidae
- Genus: Semioscopis
- Species: S. osthelderi

Binomial name
- Semioscopis osthelderi (Rebel, 1936)

Synonyms
- Epigraphia osthelderi Rebel, 1936

Species of moth

Semioscopis osthelderi is a moth in the family Depressariidae. It was described by Hans Rebel in 1936. It is found in Syria.
