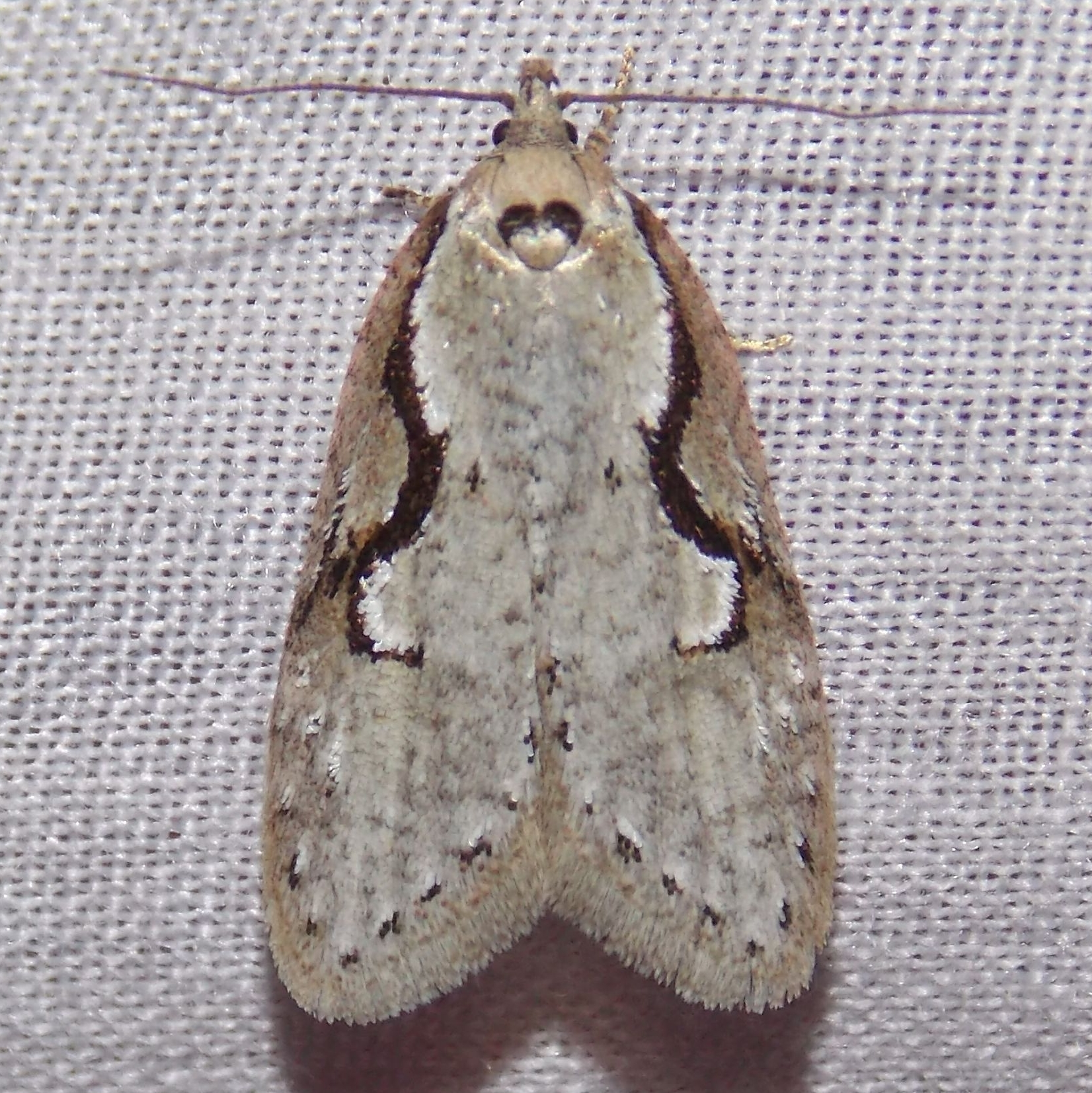

Scientific classification
- Kingdom: Animalia
- Phylum: Arthropoda
- Clade: Pancrustacea
- Class: Insecta
- Order: Lepidoptera
- Family: Depressariidae
- Genus: Semioscopis
- Species: S. packardella

Binomial name
- Semioscopis packardella (Clemens, 1863)

Synonyms
- Enicostoma packardella Clemens, 1863; Epigraphia eruditella Grote, 1880

= Semioscopis packardella =

Species of moth

Semioscopis packardella, also called Packard's concealer moth or Packard's flatbody moth, is a species of moth of the family Depressariidae. It was described by James Brackenridge Clemens in 1863. It is found in North America in central Alberta, southern Quebec, Manitoba, California, Idaho and Oregon and from New Jersey to Ohio.
