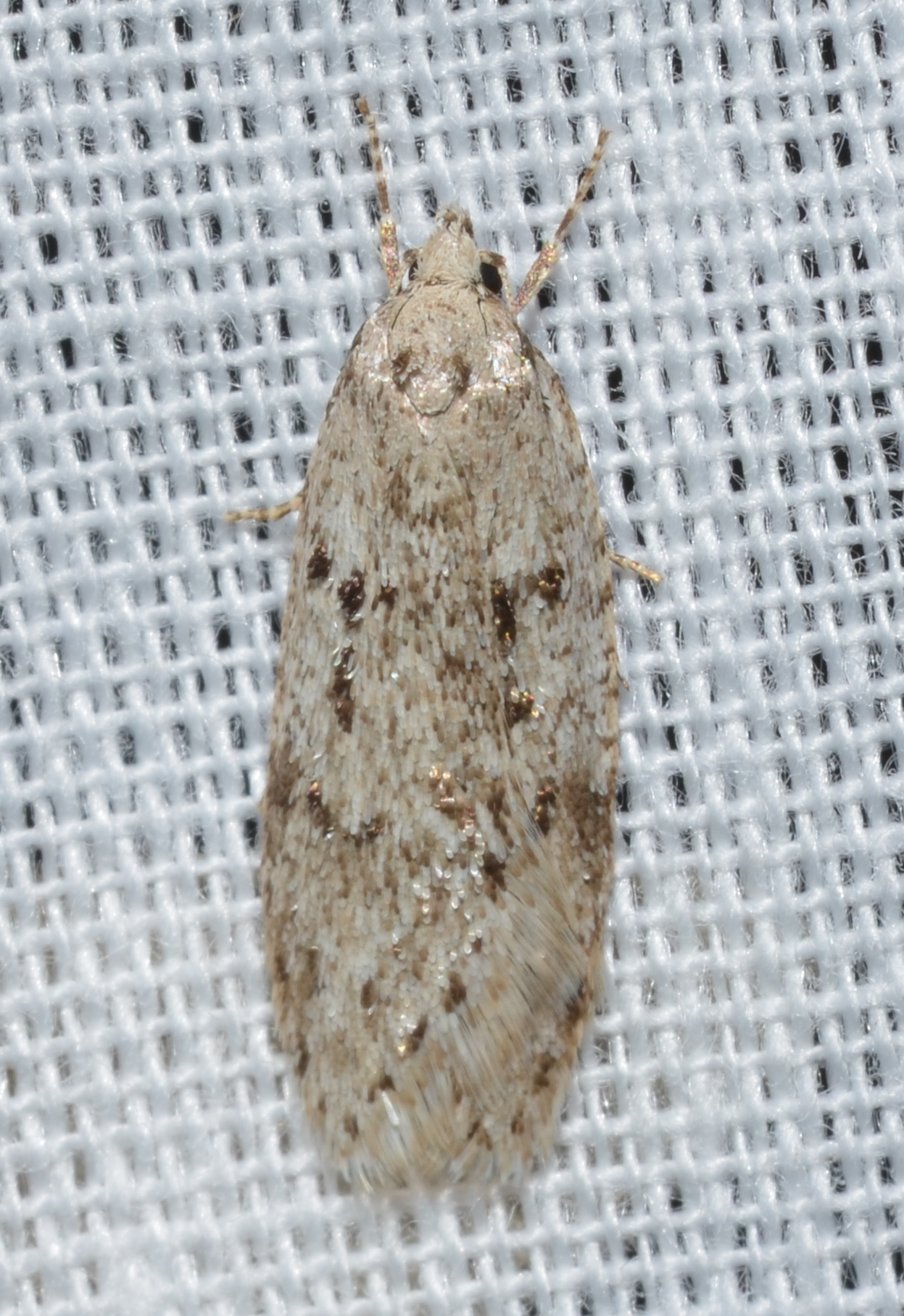

Scientific classification
- Domain: Eukaryota
- Kingdom: Animalia
- Phylum: Arthropoda
- Class: Insecta
- Order: Lepidoptera
- Family: Depressariidae
- Genus: Semioscopis
- Species: S. megamicrella

Binomial name
- Semioscopis megamicrella Dyar, 1902

Synonyms
- Semioscopis braunae Clarke, 1941

= Semioscopis megamicrella =

Species of moth

Semioscopis megamicrella is a species of moth of the family Depressariidae. It was described by Harrison Gray Dyar Jr. in 1902. It is found in the northern United States and southern Canada.

The wingspan is 15–25 mm. Adults are on wing from April to May.
