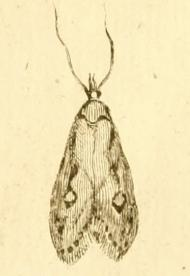

Scientific classification
- Domain: Eukaryota
- Kingdom: Animalia
- Phylum: Arthropoda
- Class: Insecta
- Order: Lepidoptera
- Family: Depressariidae
- Genus: Semioscopis
- Species: S. oculella

Binomial name
- Semioscopis oculella (Thunberg, 1794)

Synonyms
- Tinea oculella Thunberg, 1794; Tinea anella Hubner, 1796; Lemmatophila alienella Treitschke, 1832; Semioscopis anella ab. dubiella Krulikowsky, 1908

= Semioscopis oculella =

Species of moth

Semioscopis oculella is a species of moth of the family Depressariidae. It is found in most of Europe (except most of the Balkan Peninsula, the Iberian Peninsula, Great Britain, and Ireland) east to the eastern parts of the Palearctic realm.

The wingspan is 24–34 mm. Adults are on wing from March to April.

The larvae feed on Betula species.
