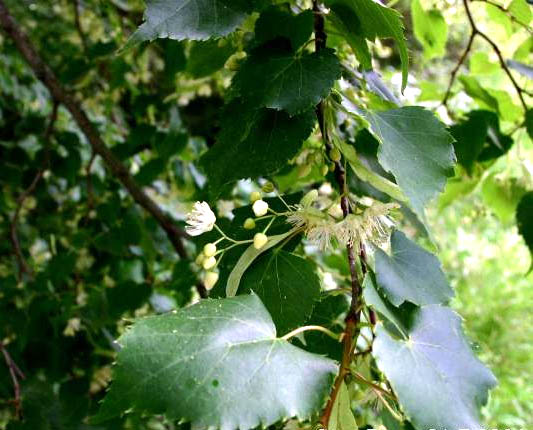

Conservation status
- Least Concern (IUCN 3.1)

Scientific classification
- Kingdom: Plantae
- Clade: Tracheophytes
- Clade: Angiosperms
- Clade: Eudicots
- Clade: Rosids
- Order: Malvales
- Family: Malvaceae
- Genus: Tilia
- Species: T. cordata

Binomial name
- Tilia cordata Mill.
- Distribution map

= Tilia cordata =

Species of tree

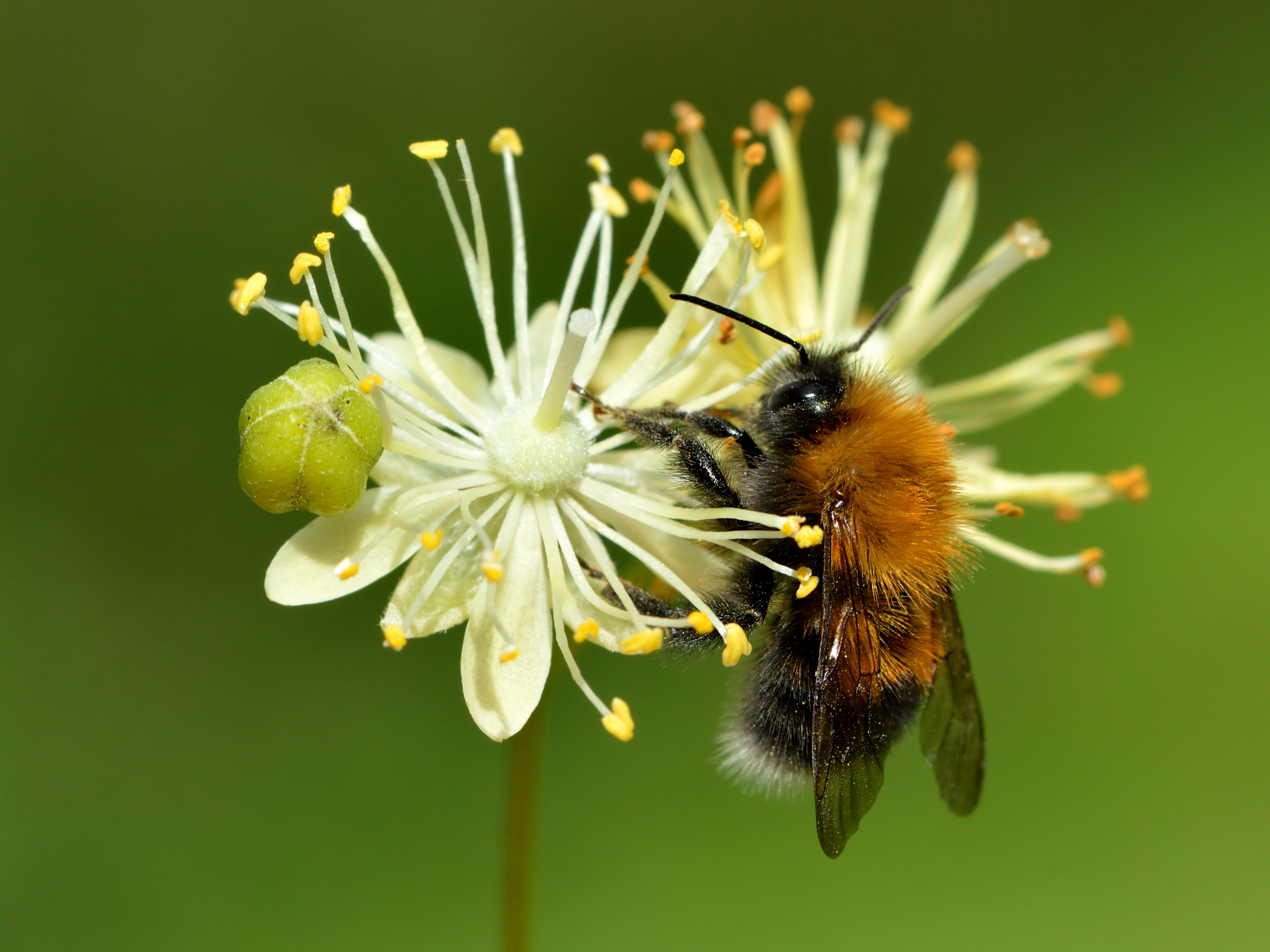
Tree bumblebee on the small-leaved lime

Tilia cordata, the small-leaved lime or small-leaved linden, is a species of tree in the family Malvaceae, native to much of Europe. Its other common names include little-leaf or littleleaf linden, or traditionally in South East England, pry or pry tree. Its range extends from Britain and Scandinavia through mainland Europe to the Caucasus and West Asia. In the south of its range, it is restricted to high elevations.

== Description ==
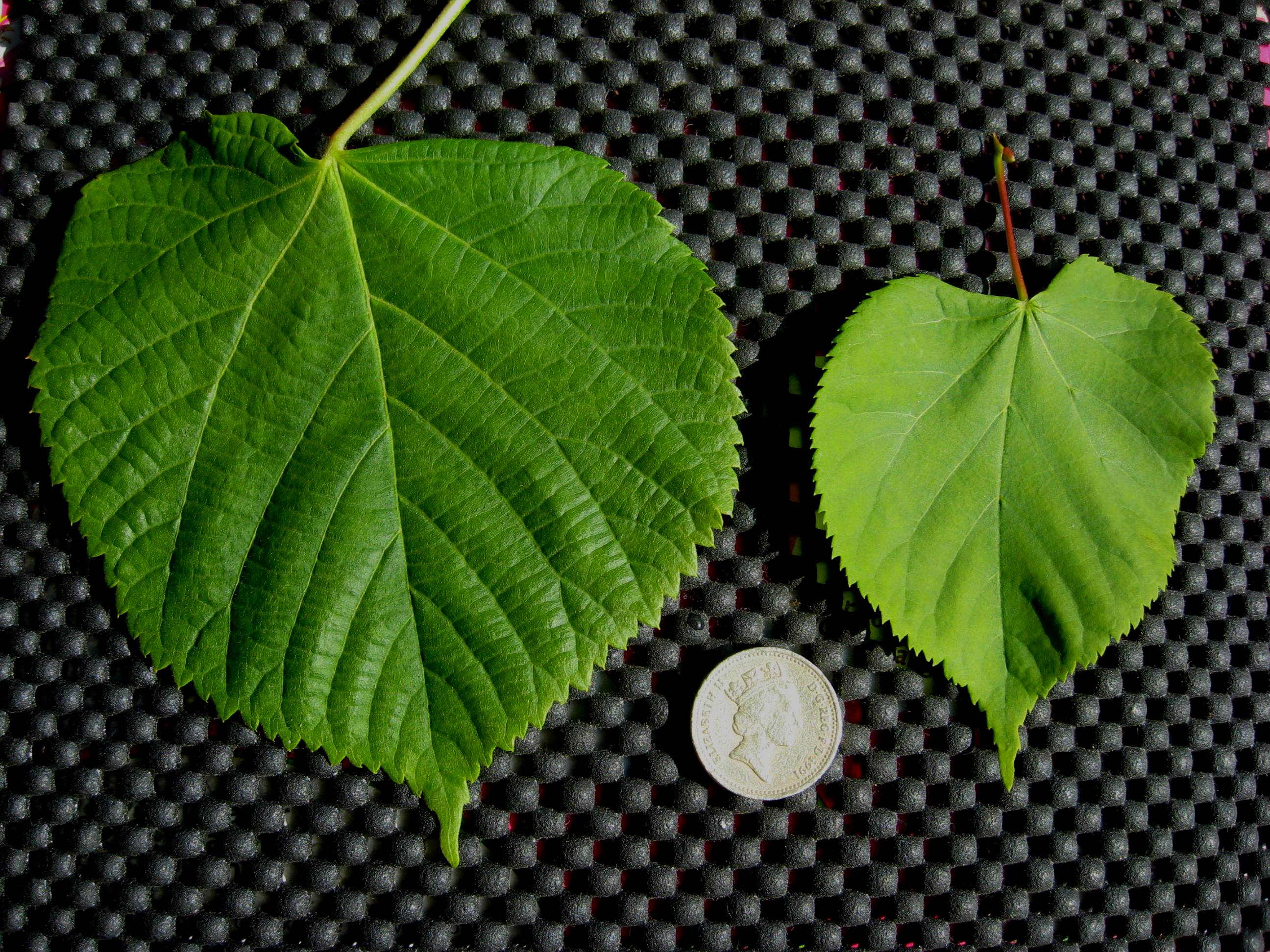
T. platyphyllos (left) and T. cordata leaf comparison

Tilia cordata is a deciduous tree growing to 20–40 m (66–131 ft) tall, diameter one-third to one-half the height, with a trunk up to 1 m (3 ft) diameter. The largest known trunk circumference was a specimen in Närke, Sweden, that measured 8.35 m (27.4 ft) circumference at chest height. Some lime trees in Germany are said to be over 1000 years old. The bark is smooth and grayish when young, and firm with vertical ridges and horizontal fissures when older. The crown is rounded in a formal oval to pyramidal shape. Branching is upright and increases in density with age. The leaves are alternately arranged, rounded to triangular-ovate, 3–8 cm (1.2–3.1 in) long and broad, mostly hairless (unlike the related Tilia platyphyllos) except for small tufts of brown hair in the leaf vein axils – the leaves are distinctively heart-shaped. The buds are alternate, pointed egg-shaped, and have red scales.

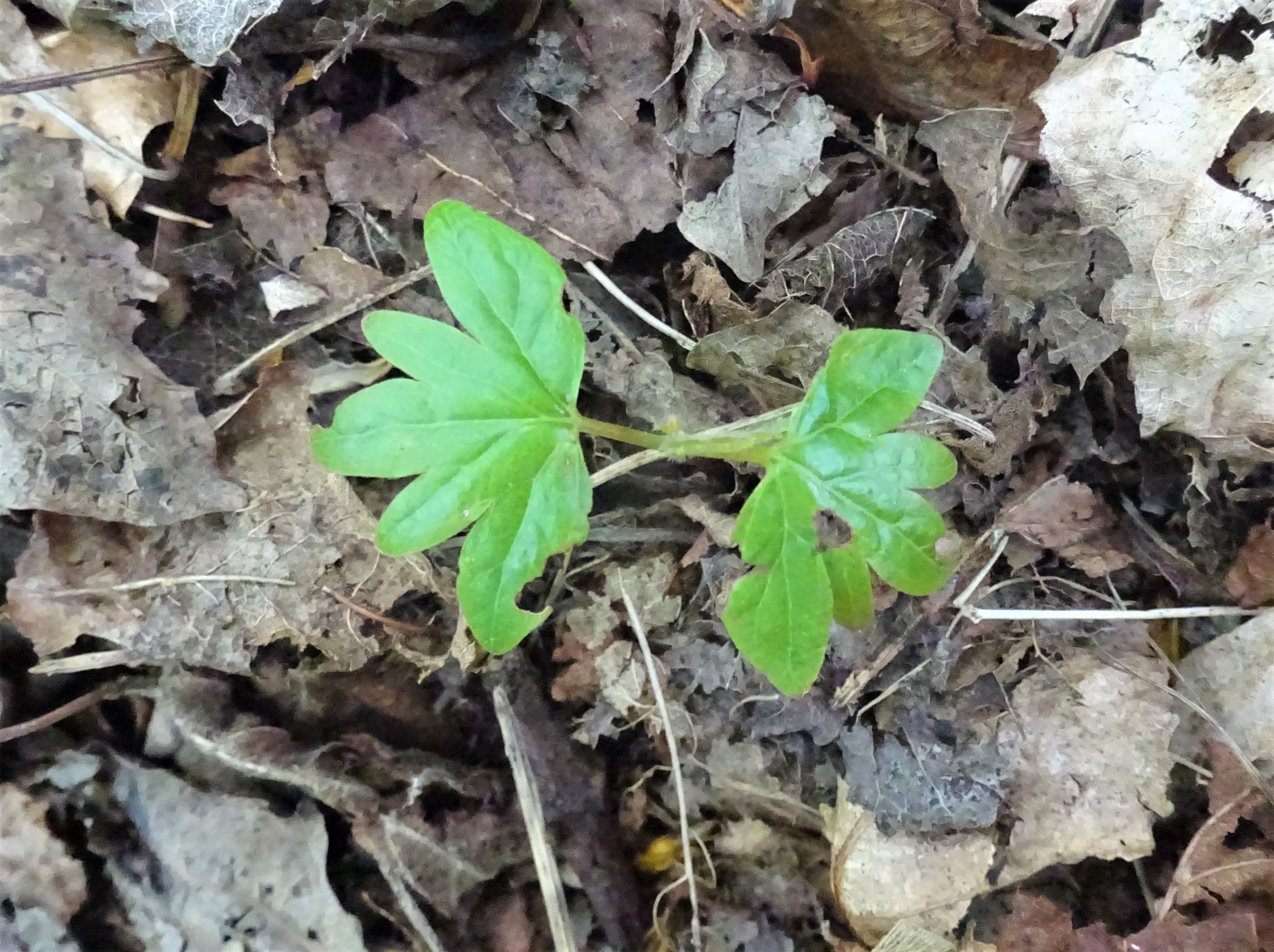
Tilia cordata seedling with cotyledons

It has no terminal bud. The small, yellow-green, hermaphrodite flowers are produced in clusters of five to 11 in early summer with a leafy yellow-green subtending bract, and have a rich, heavy scent; the trees are much visited by bees, the erect flowers of which being held above the bract. The flower arrangements of T. cordata are distinct from those of the common lime (Tilia × europaea), where the flowers are held beneath the bract. The fruit is a dry, nut-like drupe, 6–7 mm long by 4 mm broad, containing one or two brown seeds (infertile fruits are globose), downy at first, becoming smooth at maturity, and (unlike T. platyphyllos, T. × europaea) not ribbed, but very thin and easily cracked open.

== Ecology ==
The trees favour loamy soil sites, but can also be found on sandy, infertile soils and are not thought to be drought resistant. Dormant shoots of T. cordata can resist winter frost temperatures as low as −34 °C (−29 °F).

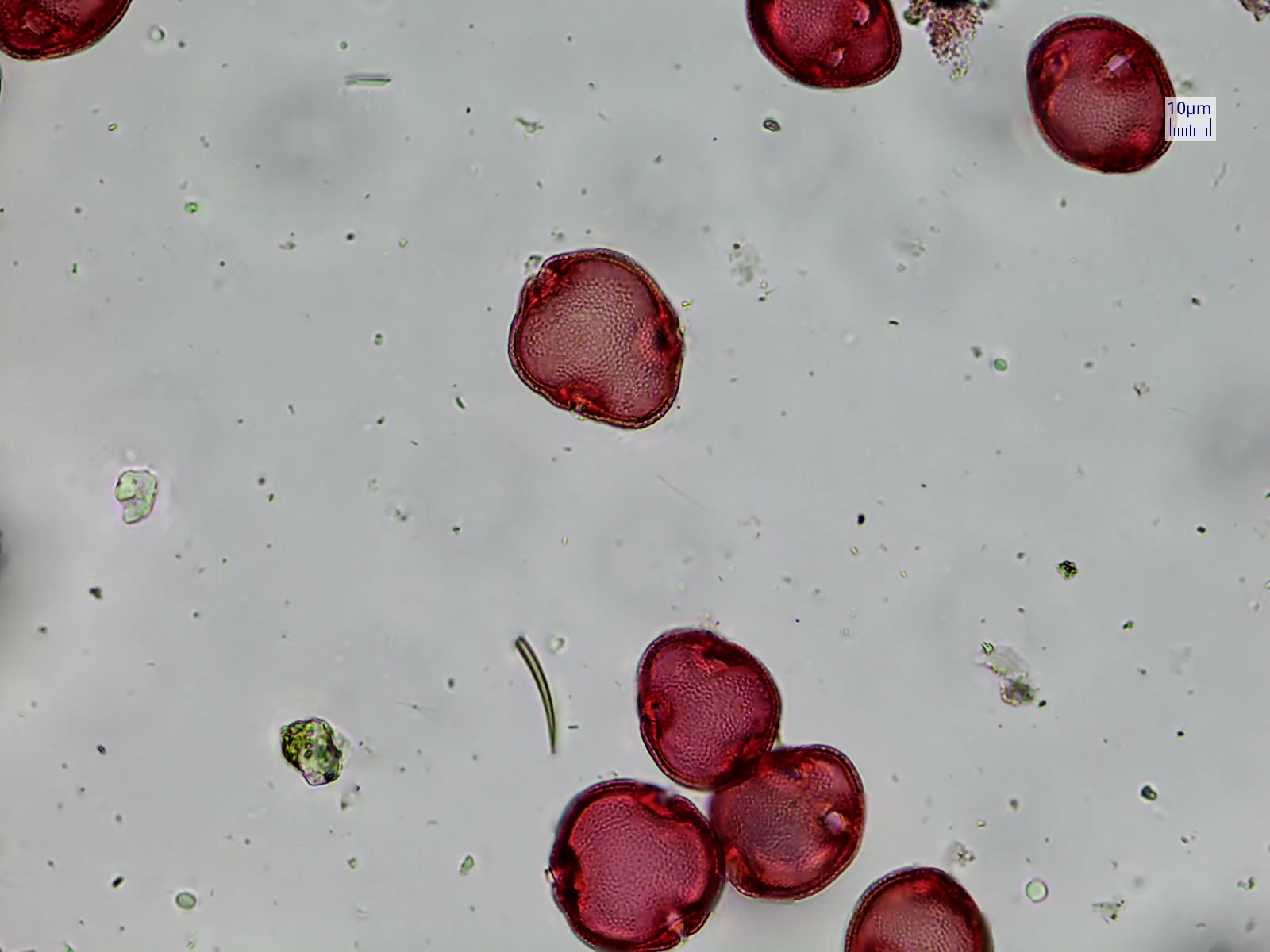
Processed, dyed small-leaved lime (T. cordata) pollen

In Britain, T. cordata, traditionally called pry, is considered an indicator of ancient woodland and is becoming increasingly rare. Owing to its rarity, a number of woods have been given SSSI status. Cocklode Wood, part of the Bardney Limewoods in Lincolnshire, is the best surviving spread of medieval small-leaved limes in England. A similar site is Shrawley Wood in Worcestershire. Small-leaved lime was once regarded as holy and good for carving.

Trees in northern England were found to have established when the climate was warmer and have adapted to the cooling climate. Paleobotanical analysis of tree pollen preserved in peat deposits demonstrates that T. cordata was present as a woodland tree in the southern Lake District c. 3100 BC. In spite of the late migration of T. cordata into the Lake District, pollen diagrams from many sites show rapid expansion, so that within a few centuries, it had become plentiful and even locally dominant in the southern valleys. Maximum values for Tilia from all pollen diagrams available for the north of England show a conspicuous concentration of high values in the southern Lake District. At several sites among the limestone hills on both sides of the estuary of the River Kent, the curves for Tilia, although beginning about 4800 to 4000 BC, then achieve values of at least 10% within a few centuries. At Witherslack in Cumbria, values of this magnitude persist for a depth of 3 m (10 ft) which represents about 4000 years. For much of this period Ulmus is approximately 10%, Quercus 20% and the remaining arboreal pollen is largely that of Alnus. For a shorter period Tilia exceeds Quercus and reaches a maximum of 30%. The (Witherslack) basin is about 200 m (660 ft) in width, so that with distance correction factors applied this indicates that the surrounding woodlands on well-drained soils contained Tilia, Quercus and Ulmus in the proportions 4:1:1. Modern mature woodland trees were estimated to have germinated between 1150 and 1300 AD, making them around 800 years old. Precise age determination is impossible, as heartwood at the centre disintegrates and therefore rings cannot be counted, and other methods are used.

== Pests and diseases ==
The tree is fairly disease-resistant, though a common problem is leaf scorch where planted on dry soils, but leaf scorch is not a long-term problem, as the leaves are lost in the autumn. Pests include Japanese beetles, aphids, lace bugs, linden jewel beetles, and various species of moths, such as Lymantria dispar dispar (gypsy moth). This moth is one of the top 100 invasive species in North America, introduced by Étienne Léopold Trouvelot, and citizens are encouraged to remove gypsy moth egg masses and cocoons from tree bark to help prevent the spread of this species.

== Cultivation and uses ==
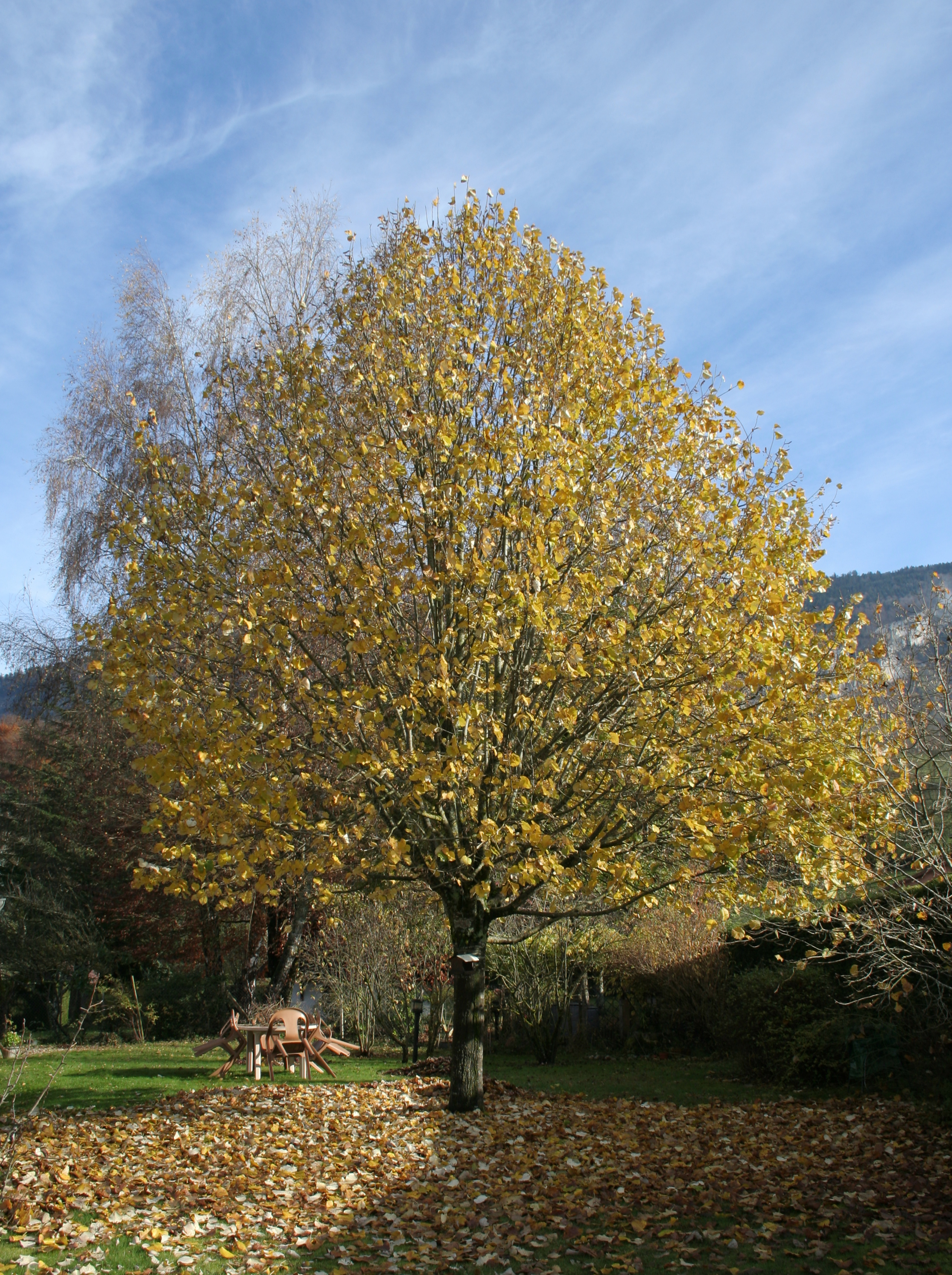
15-year-old lime-tree, Haute-Savoie, France

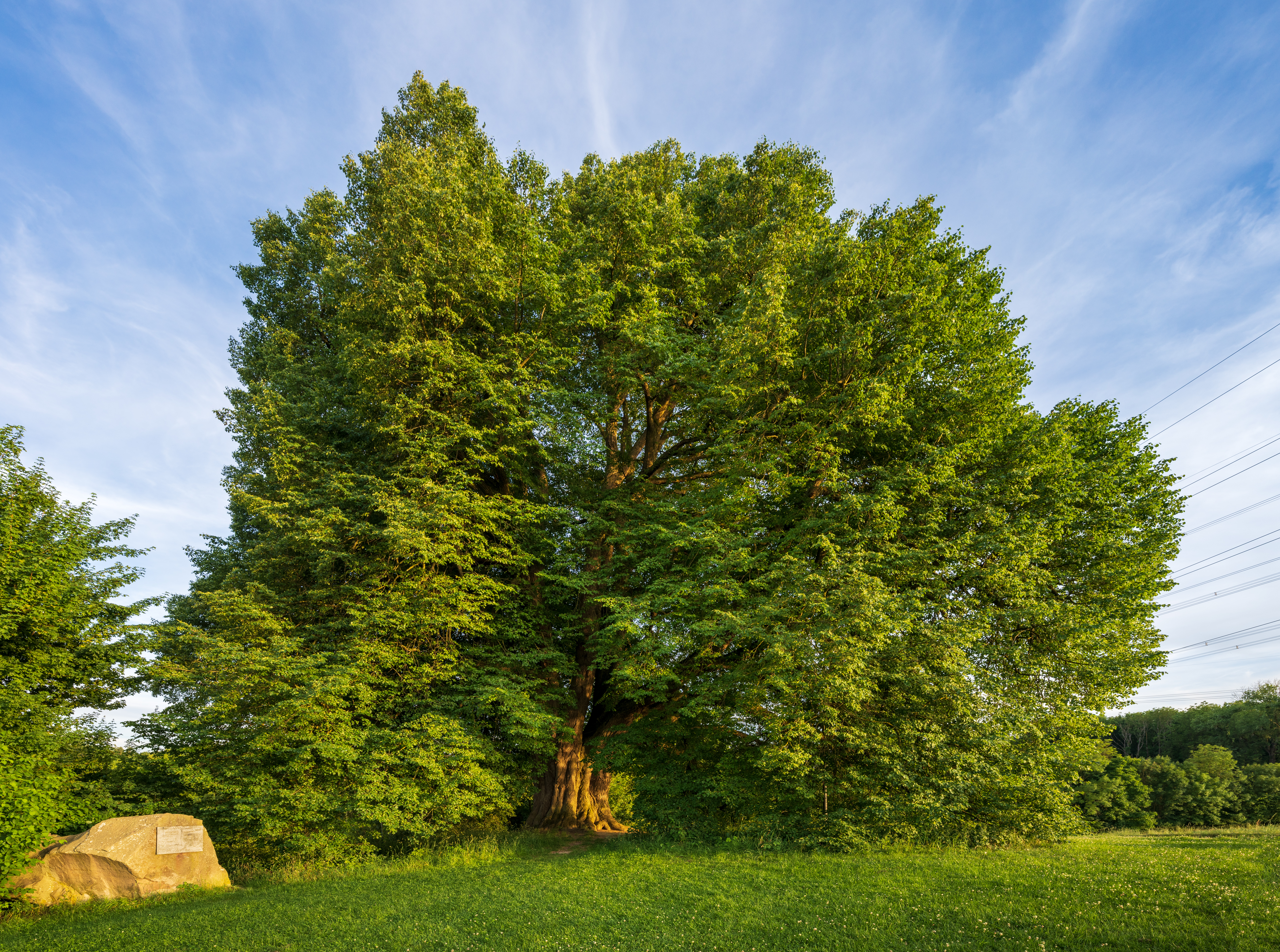
A 300-year-old tree, near Kirchhausen, Heilbronn

Tilia cordata is widely grown as an ornamental tree. It was much planted to form avenues in 17th- and early 18th-century landscape planning. A famous example is Unter den Linden in Berlin. It is also widely cultivated in North America as a substitute for the native Tilia americana (American linden or basswood) which has a larger leaf, coarser in texture; there, it has been renamed "little-leaf linden". It is popular as a shade tree with its dense canopy, as an ornamental tree with its architectural shape, and as a street tree. In the US, T. cordata has been planted in Wellesley, Massachusettes; Modesto, California; Chicago, Illinois; Indianapolis, Indiana; and Atlanta, Georgia as street trees. Europe has espaliered trees owing to their ability to survive heavy pruning. T. cordata is an easy tree to train for bonsai when the training is not done all at once. Letting the tree recoup in between sessions over a period of several months creates a healthy, good-looking miniature tree. Prior to the advent of firearms, it was also commonly used for making shields (as referenced in Beowulf).

Tilia cordata survives best in a soil pH range of 5.0 to 8.0. and in USDA hardiness zones 3–7. The tree prefers moist, well-drained soil, and can survive flooding; it is not highly drought tolerant. It does not do well in soils with high salinity.

=== Notable trees ===
The Najevnik linden tree (Slovene: Najevska lipa), about 700 years old, has the broadest trunk of any tree in Slovenia at 10.7 m (35 ft). It is a place of cultural events; every June, a national meeting of Slovene politicians takes place under it.

=== Hybrids ===
- Common lime: T. cordata readily hybridises with Tilia platyphyllos; the hybrid is commonly known as common lime, Tilia × europaea (syn. T. × vulgaris).

=== Cultivars ===
- 'Corinthian' ('Corzam') – dense, uniform limb spacing creates a compact, pyramidal, formal shape; darker and smaller leaves; resistant to Japanese beetles.
- 'Greenspire' – the most common, a cross between the cultivar 'Euclid' and a selection from the Boston Parks, broadly used as a street tree, survives better under difficult conditions, overall a good looking, quick growing tree.
- 'June Bride' – significantly pyramidal habit, evenly spaced branches around a very straight central leader, glossier leaves, and 3 to 4 times as many flowers.
- 'Winter Orange' – rich red-orange-brown stems with reddish buds, can be cut back to grow long shoot extensions. It has gained the Royal Horticultural Society's Award of Garden Merit.

=== Linden flower tea ===
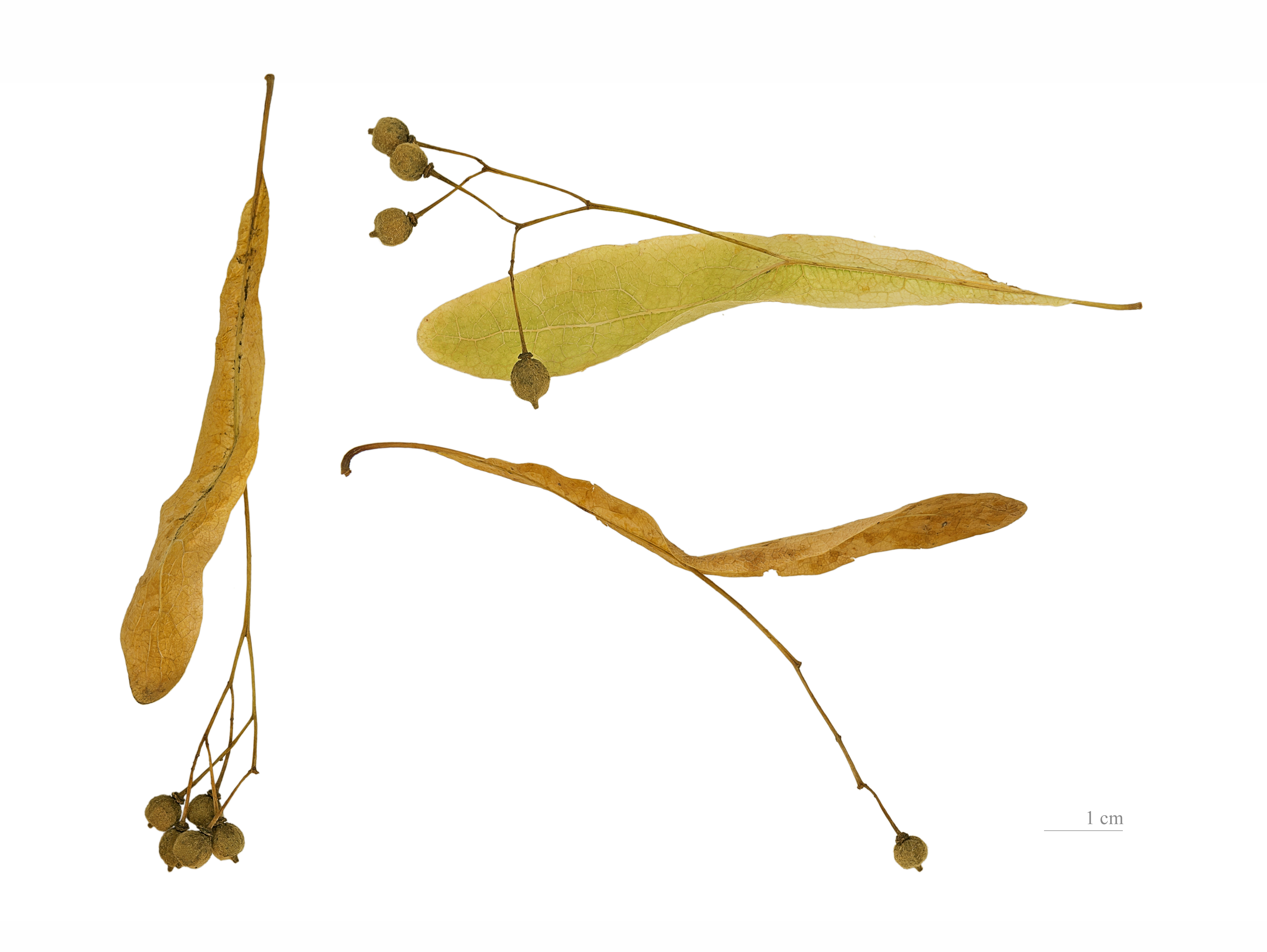
Mature fruits

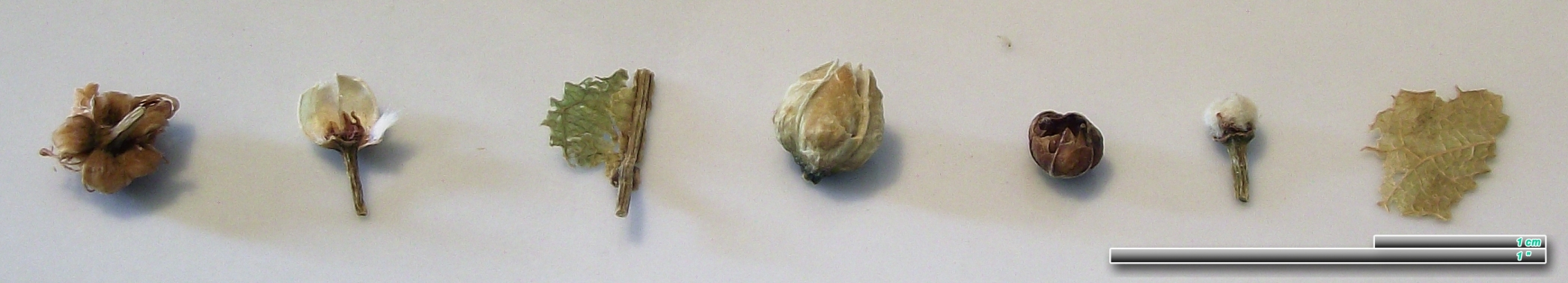
Tiliae flos: Flowers (and impurities consisting of other parts) of T. cordata as commonly used in linden flower tea

In the countries of Central, Southern, and Western Europe, linden flowers are a traditional herbal remedy made into an herbal tea (tisane) called lime tea or linden tea in Britain, tilleul in France, tila in Spain.

=== Honey ===
A monofloral honey is produced by bees using the trees and is widely used all over Europe. "Linden honey" is said to be nutritious and to have medicinal qualities.

=== Leaves ===
The young leaves can be eaten as a salad vegetable. Cattle often graze upon them.

=== Linden wood ===
The white, finely grained wood is not a structurally strong material, but a classic choice for refined woodcarvings such as those by Grinling Gibbons for ornate altarpieces, and the Veit Stoss altarpiece in Kraków, southern Poland. Linden wood was the prime choice for the carvings in St. Paul's Cathedral, Windsor Castle, and Chatsworth House. It is also commonly used for lightweight projects such as carved spoons, light furniture, bee hives, and honeycomb frames.

== Cultural significance ==
Tilia cordata pictured in the coat of arms of Valmiera, the city in Latvia

Tilia cordata is the national tree of the Czech Republic and the Slovak Republic, and one of two national trees in Latvia. The leaf of Tilia cordata is also considered a national symbol of Slovenia.
