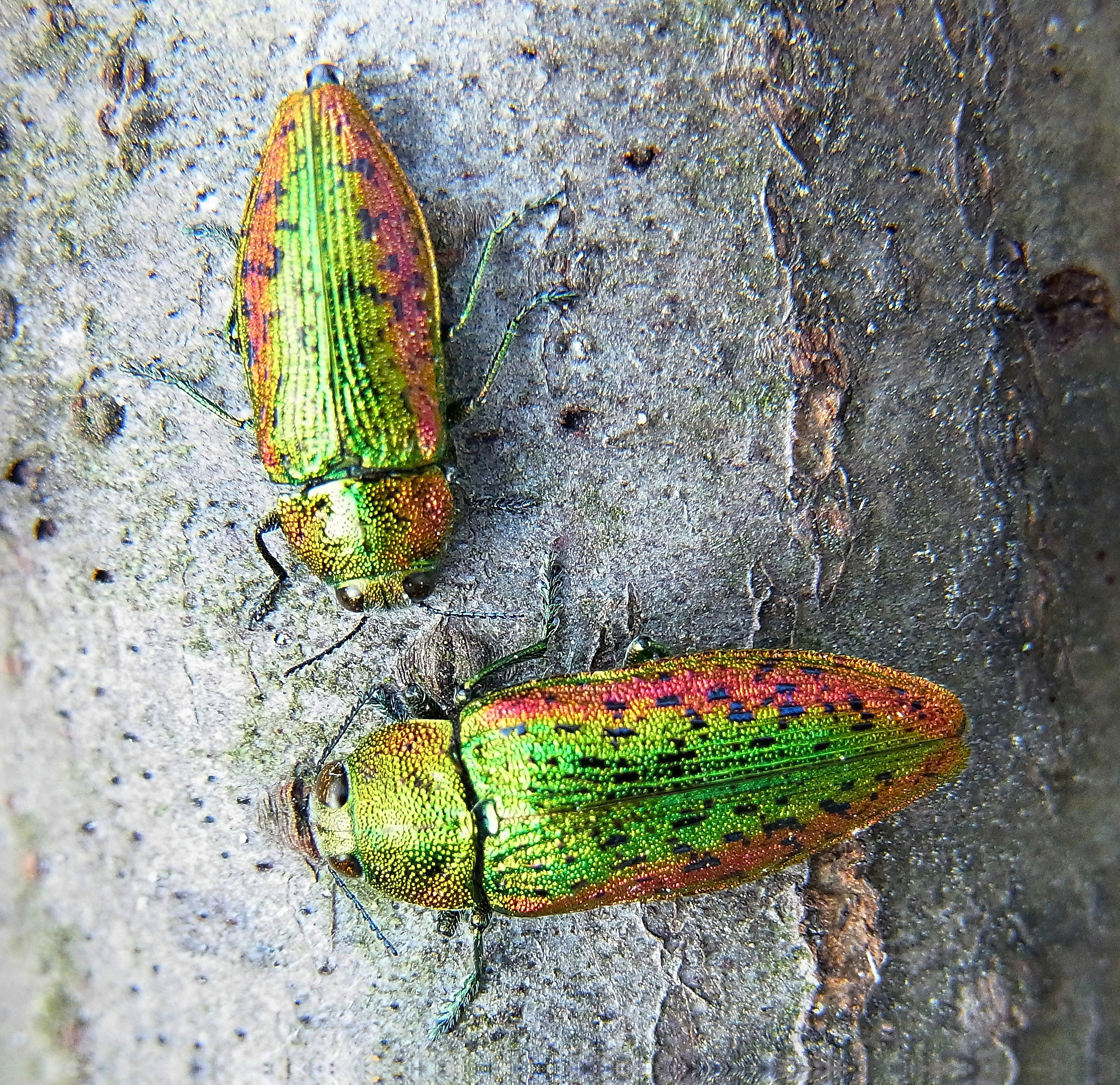

Scientific classification
- Kingdom: Animalia
- Phylum: Arthropoda
- Clade: Pancrustacea
- Class: Insecta
- Order: Coleoptera
- Suborder: Polyphaga
- Infraorder: Elateriformia
- Family: Buprestidae
- Genus: Lamprodila; Motschulsky, 1860

= Lamprodila =

Genus of beetles

Lamprodila is a genus of beetles in the family Buprestidae, containing the following species:

- Lamprodila aenea (Deyrolle, 1864)
- Lamprodila amurensis (Obenberger, 1924)
- Lamprodila andrei (Descarpentries & Villiers, 1963)
- Lamprodila apicalis (Deyrolle, 1864)
- Lamprodila assamensis (Stebbing, 1914)
- Lamprodila auricollis (Deyrolle, 1864)
- Lamprodila auripilis (Obenberger, 1922)
- Lamprodila balcanica (Kirchsberg, 1876)
- Lamprodila beauchenii (Fairmaire, 1889)
- Lamprodila bedoci (Bourgoin, 1924)
- Lamprodila bella (Gory, 1840)
- Lamprodila blairi (Bourgoin, 1924)
- Lamprodila chounramany (Baudon, 1963)
- Lamprodila clermonti (Obenberger, 1924)
- Lamprodila coomani (Descarpentries & Villiers, 1963)
- Lamprodila cretica (Zabransky, 1994)
- Lamprodila cupraria (Fairmaire, 1898)
- Lamprodila cupreosplendens (Kerremans, 1895)
- Lamprodila cuprosa (Obenberger, 1922)
- Lamprodila davidis (Fairmaire, 1887)
- Lamprodila decipiens (Gebler, 1847)
- Lamprodila elongata (Kerremans, 1895)
- Lamprodila festiva (Linnaeus, 1767)
- Lamprodila francoisi (Baudon, 1965)
- Lamprodila gautieri (Bruyant, 1902)
- Lamprodila gebhardti (Obenberger, 1928)
- Lamprodila gentilis (Laporte & Gory, 1837)
- Lamprodila gloriosa (Marseul, 1865)
- Lamprodila hideoi (Akiyama, 1987)
- Lamprodila hoschecki (Obenberger, 1917)
- Lamprodila igneilimbata (Kurosawa, 1946)
- Lamprodila iranica (Obenberger, 1952)
- Lamprodila jacobsoni (Obenberger, 1928)
- Lamprodila khamvenae (Baudon, 1962)
- Lamprodila kheili (Obenberger, 1925)
- Lamprodila klapaleki (Obenberger, 1924)
- Lamprodila kucerai (Bílý, 1999)
- Lamprodila kunioi (Ohmomo, 2005)
- Lamprodila leoparda (Deyrolle, 1864)
- Lamprodila limbata (Gebler, 1832)
- Lamprodila lukjanovitshi (Richter, 1952)
- Lamprodila lydiae (Bourgoin, 1922)
- Lamprodila maculipennis (Bílý, 1997)
- Lamprodila madurensis (Obenberger, 1916)
- Lamprodila magnifica (Kerremans, 1892)
- Lamprodila maindroni (Théry, 1911)
- Lamprodila milletae (Baudon, 1966)
- Lamprodila mirifica (Mulsant, 1855)
- Lamprodila nigrofasciata (Saunders, 1867)
- Lamprodila nigrogutta (Deyrolle, 1864)
- Lamprodila nigroviolacea (Théry, 1934)
- Lamprodila nipponensis (Kurosawa, 1953)
- Lamprodila nobilissima (Mannerheim, 1852)
- Lamprodila pantherina (Deyrolle, 1864)
- Lamprodila pendleburyi (Fisher, 1933)
- Lamprodila perakensis (Fisher, 1933)
- Lamprodila perroti (Descarpentries & Villiers, 1963)
- Lamprodila plasoni (Théry, 1934)
- Lamprodila pretiosa (Mannerheim, 1852)
- Lamprodila provostii (Fairmaire, 1887)
- Lamprodila pseudovirgata (Ohmomo, 2005)
- Lamprodila psilopteroides (Deyrolle, 1864)
- Lamprodila pulchra (Obenberger, 1921)
- Lamprodila purpuricollis (Hoscheck, 1931)
- Lamprodila refulgens (Obenberger, 1924)
- Lamprodila rondoni (Baudon, 1962)
- Lamprodila rutilans (Fabricius, 1777)
- Lamprodila saitohi (Ohmomo, 2005)
- Lamprodila sakaii (Akiyama & Ohmomo, 1993)
- Lamprodila sarrauti (Bourgoin, 1922)
- Lamprodila savioi (Pic, 1923)
- Lamprodila schaeferi (Descarpentries & Villiers, 1963)
- Lamprodila semperi (Saunders, 1874)
- Lamprodila sexspinosa (Thomson, 1857)
- Lamprodila shirozui (Ohmomo, 2005)
- Lamprodila siamensis (Descarpentries & Villiers, 1963)
- Lamprodila solieri (Laporte & Gory, 1837)
- Lamprodila stigmata (Bellamy, 1998)
- Lamprodila subcoerulea (Kerremans, 1895)
- Lamprodila suyfunensis (Obenberger, 1934)
- Lamprodila taiwania (Hattori & Ong, 2018)
- Lamprodila ternatensis (Obenberger, 1924)
- Lamprodila tschitscherini (Semenov, 1895)
- Lamprodila tuerki (Ganglbauer, 1882)
- Lamprodila virgata (Motschulsky, 1859)
- Lamprodila vivata (Lewis, 1893)
