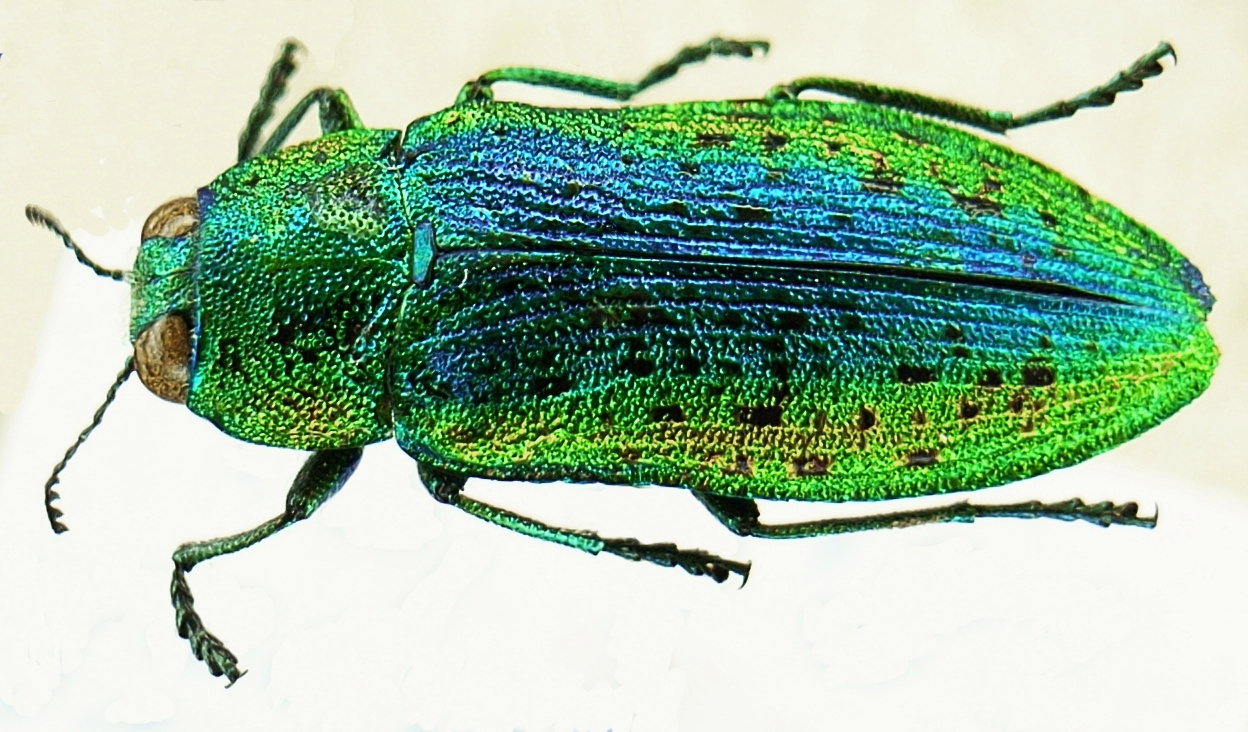

Scientific classification
- Kingdom: Animalia
- Phylum: Arthropoda
- Clade: Pancrustacea
- Class: Insecta
- Order: Coleoptera
- Suborder: Polyphaga
- Infraorder: Elateriformia
- Family: Buprestidae
- Genus: Lamprodila
- Species: L. rutilans

Binomial name
- Lamprodila rutilans (Fabricius, 1777)

Subspecies
- Lamprodila rutilans rutilans; Lamprodila rutilans podolica Obenberger, 1952

Synonyms
- List: Buprestis aeruginosa Herbst, 1790; Buprestis fastuosa Well, 1781; Buprestis gemmea Voet, 1806; Buprestis rustica Schrank, 1781; Buprestis rutilans Fabricius, 1777; Lampra immaculata Schilsky, 1888; Lampra inornata Théry, 1898; Lampra rutilans Fabricius, 1777; Lamprodila aeruginosa Herbst, 1790; Lamprodila fastuosa Well, 1781; Lamprodila gemmea Voet, 1806; Lamprodila immaculata Schilsky, 1888; Lamprodila inornata Théry, 1898; Lamprodila rustica Schrank, 1781; Ovalisia rutilans Fabricius, 1777; Poecilonota rutilans Fabricius, 1777; Scintillatrix rutilans Fabricius, 1777

= Lamprodila rutilans =

Species of beetle

Lamprodila rutilans, known as the linden jewel beetle, is a European species of metallic wood-boring beetles associated with linden trees. Adult beetles have elongated, oval body shape with a length of 11-15 mm. Their coloration is variable, but most often dominated by metallic green color with scattered black spots on elytra. They are typically found in towns and villages on linden trees in tree alleys and parks.

== Distribution ==
L. rutilans lives in southern, central, and eastern Europe. In Fennoscandia, it can be found only in southern Norway. The subspecies podolica lives in Ukraine and Russia.

== Life cycle ==
The xylophagous larvae develop in or under the bark of old but still-living linden trees of the species Tilia platyphyllos or T. cordata. Development usually takes two years in central Europe and one year in southern Europe. The larvae pupate in April. Adults emerge through elliptical openings and are active from May to July. Females lay eggs into cracks of tree bark.

== Behavior ==
The process of emerging from bark is laborious for the adult beetles and can take several hours. On hot, sunny days, the adult beetles can be seen flying around their host trees and sitting on their bark and leaves, preferring sun-dazzled branches. Males prefer the upper parts of the tree. The adults are not attracted by flowers.
