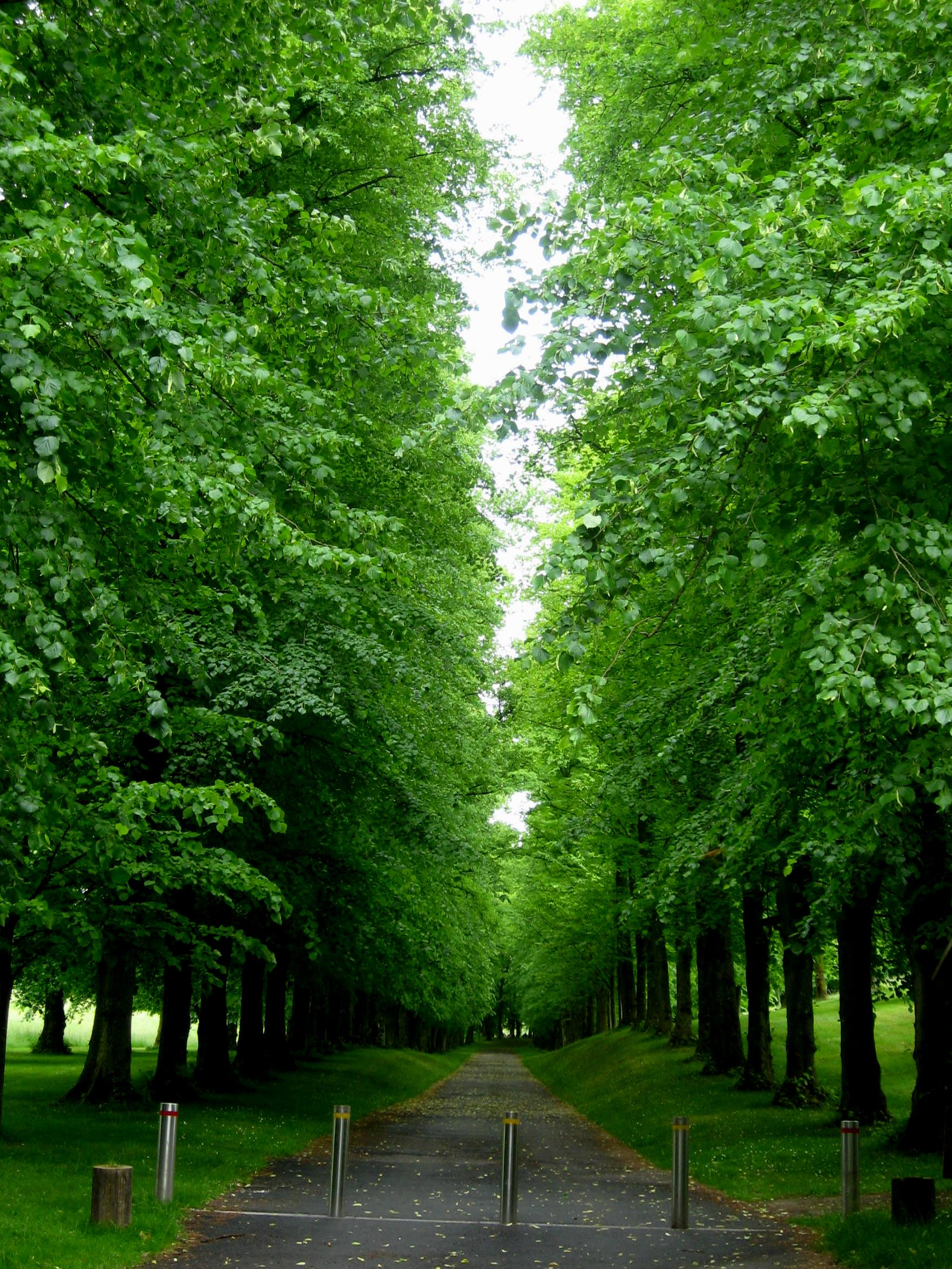
- Avenue of common limes, Hampshire, UK

Scientific classification
- Kingdom: Plantae
- Clade: Tracheophytes
- Clade: Angiosperms
- Clade: Eudicots
- Clade: Rosids
- Order: Malvales
- Family: Malvaceae
- Genus: Tilia
- Species: T. × europaea

Binomial name
- Tilia × europaea L.

Synonyms
- Tilia × vulgaris Hayne

= Tilia × europaea =

Species of flowering plant

Tilia × europaea, generally known as the European lime, common lime (British Isles) or common linden, is a naturally occurring hybrid between Tilia cordata (small-leaved lime) and Tilia platyphyllos (large-leaved lime). It occurs in the wild in Europe at scattered localities wherever the two parent species are both native. It is not closely related to the lime fruit tree, a citrus species.

== Description ==
Tilia × europaea is a large deciduous tree up to 15–50 metres (49–164 feet) tall with a trunk up to 2.5 m (8 ft). The base of the trunk often features burrs and a dense mass of brushwood. The leaves are intermediate between the parents, 6–15 centimetres (2–6 inches) long and 6–12 cm (2–5 in) broad, thinly hairy below with tufts of denser hairs in the leaf vein axils. The flowers are produced in clusters of four to ten in early summer with a leafy yellow-green subtending bract; they are fragrant, and pollinated by bees. The floral formula is ✶ K5 C5 A0+5^{∞} G(5). The fruit is a dry nut-like drupe 8 millimetres (3/8 in) in diameter, downy and faintly ribbed.

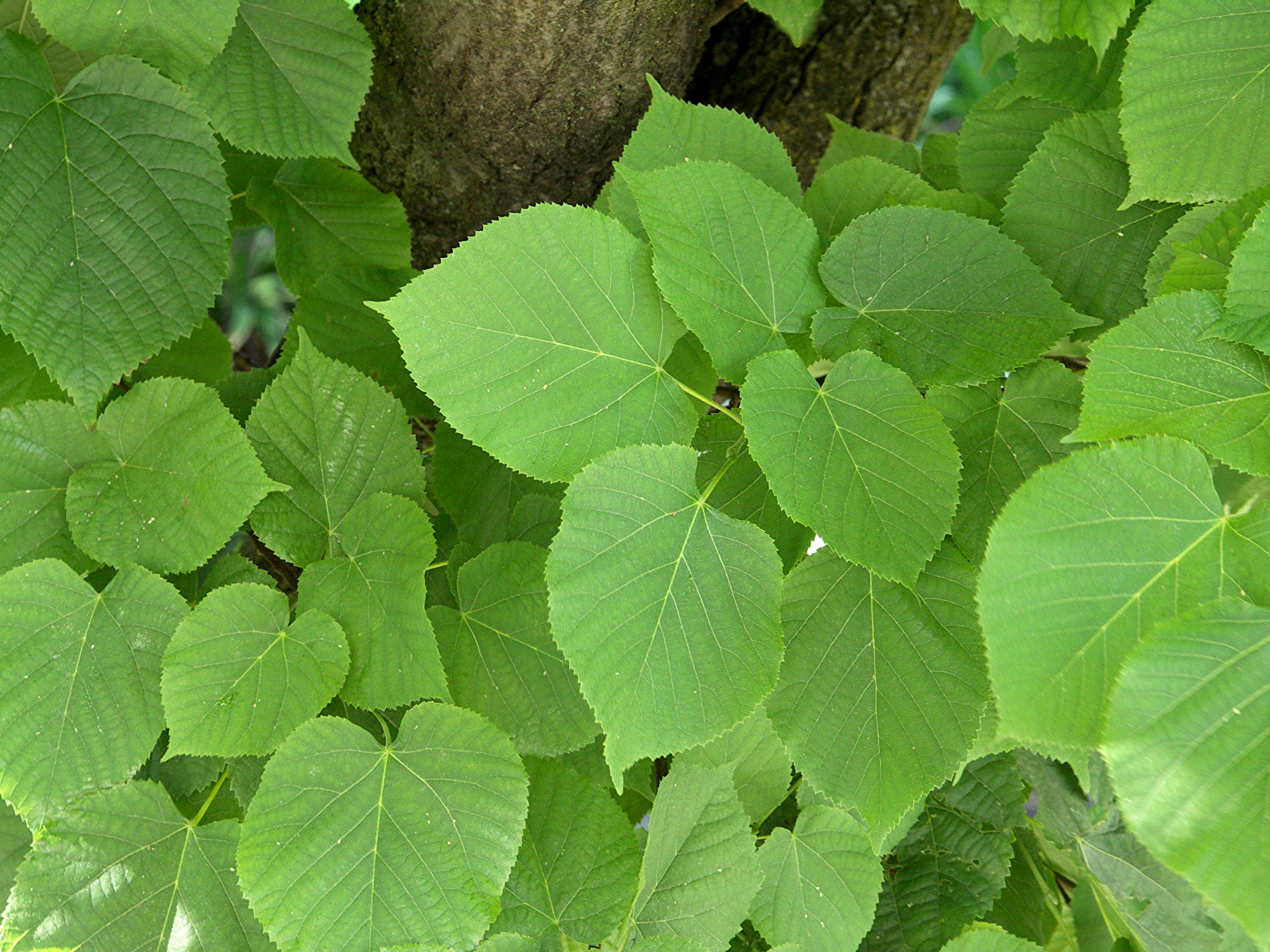
Foliage

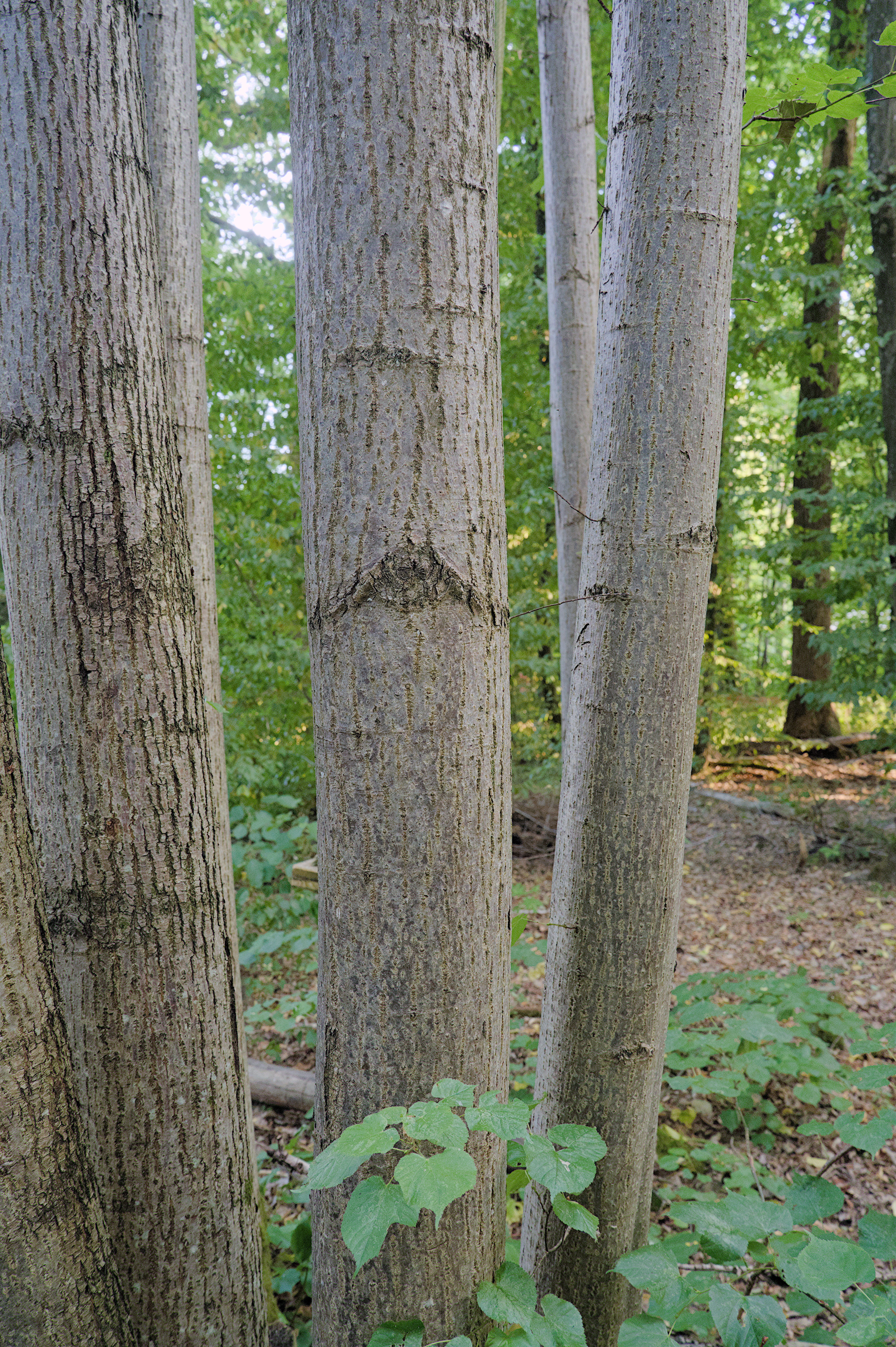
Trunks

== Cultivation ==
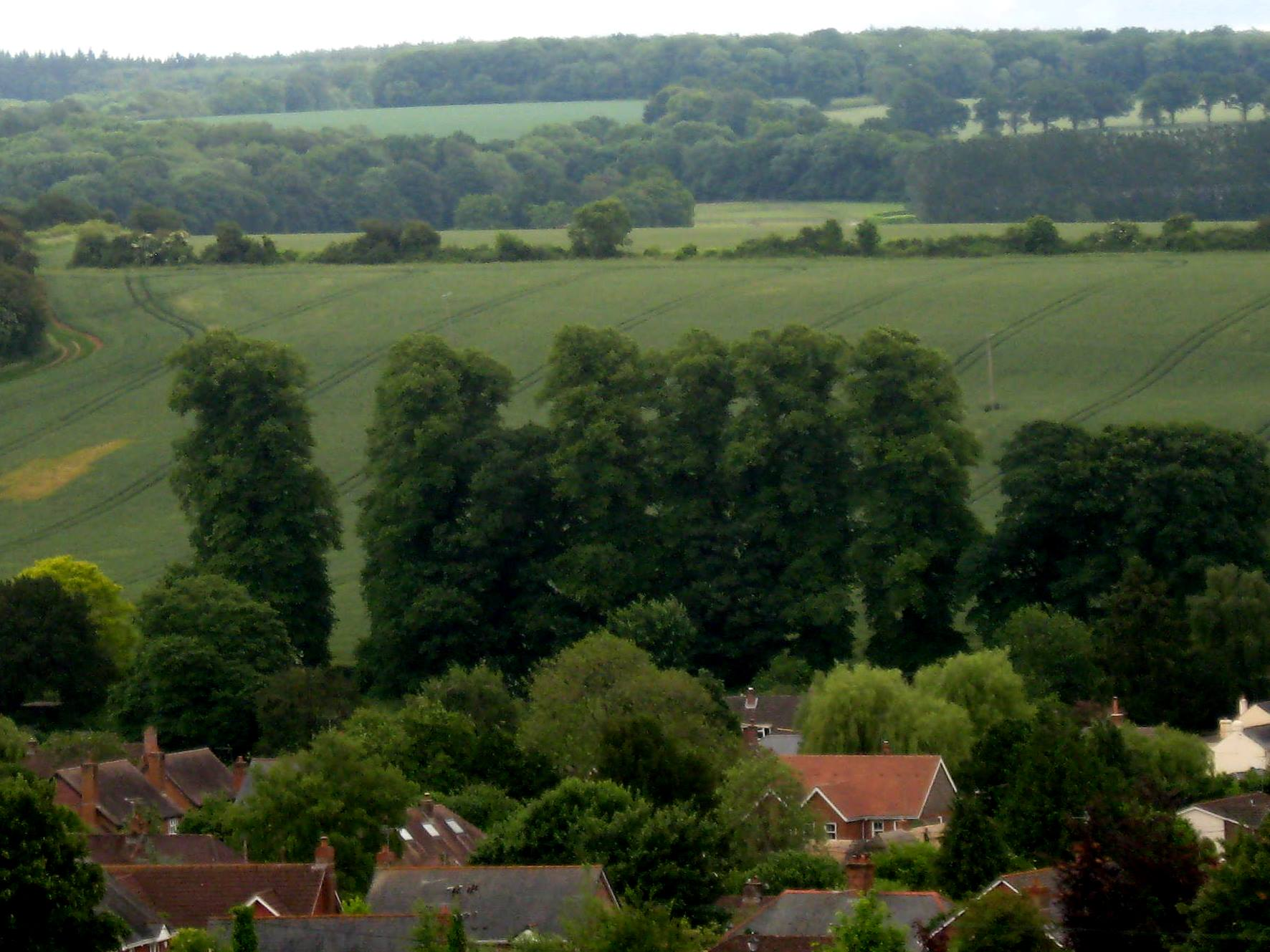
Common limes (foreground) in the landscape of King's Somborne, United Kingdom

This hybrid is very widely cultivated, being readily and inexpensively propagated by layering; as a result, it is often the commonest Tilia species in urban areas and along avenues and streets. It is not however the best species for this purpose, as it produces abundant stem sprouts, and also often hosts heavy aphid populations resulting in honeydew deposits on everything underneath the trees. Furthermore, there is substantial leaf litter in autumn.

=== Notable trees ===
One long-lived example was the "Malmvik lime", planted as a sapling near the Malmvik Manor in Stockholm, Sweden in 1618. The tree existed for 381 years until the last part of the tree fell in a storm in 1999. The UK Tree Register Champion is at Aysgarth, Yorkshire, measuring 26 m (85 ft) in height and 295 cm (9 ft 8 in) diameter at breast height in 2009. The tree in front of Augustusburg Hunting Lodge in Saxony was planted in 1421 according to the chronicles of Augustusburg. Some 13 limes were planted at Mullary cemetery Co Louth Ireland to commemorate "king Billy's" victory at the battle of the Boyne in circa 1669 as lime are not native to Ireland and they were planted to mark the foreign victory, they remain standing today. The Murten lime tree was planted in Fribourg, Switzerland, in 1470 and survived until 1985. A few years before it died, cuttings were taken and planted in various locations from 1985 onwards. According to legend, the historic lime tree is said to commemorate the Swiss Confederates' victory at the Battle of Morat. That is why it is known today as the Murten lime tree (Murtenlinde, (German) or Tilleul de Morat (French)).

== Uses ==
The leaves, except for their stalks, can be eaten raw.

The flowers are used in tea, producing a mildly relaxing effect.

The wood of the lime was commonly used by Vikings in their shields.
