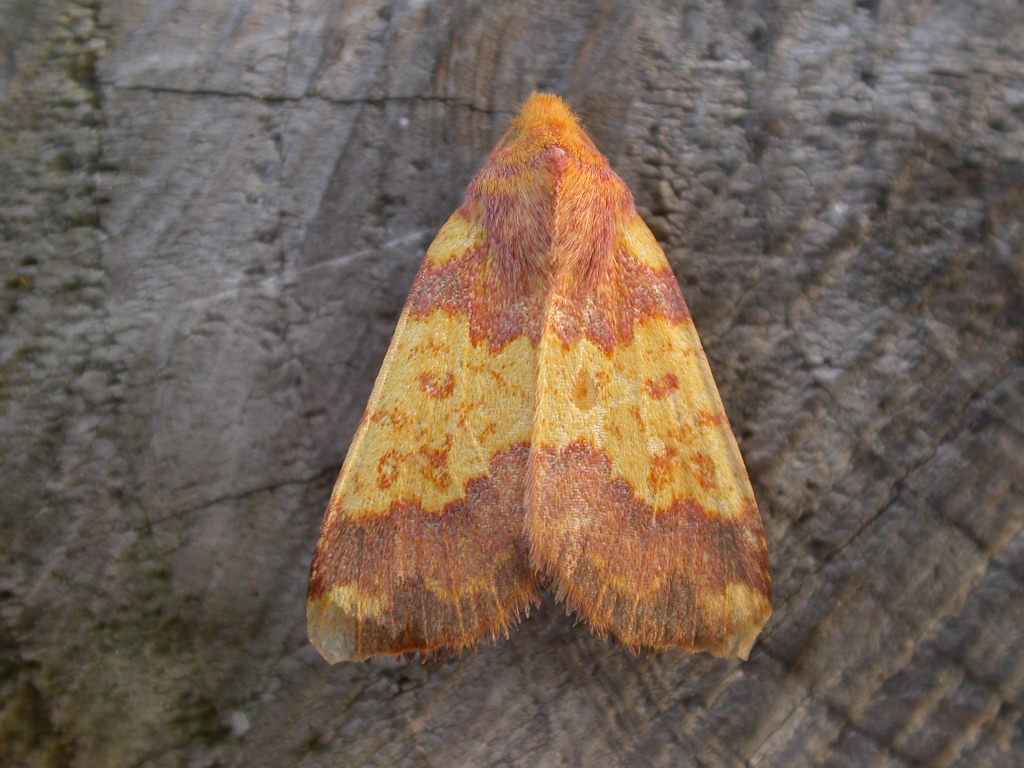

Scientific classification
- Domain: Eukaryota
- Kingdom: Animalia
- Phylum: Arthropoda
- Class: Insecta
- Order: Lepidoptera
- Superfamily: Noctuoidea
- Family: Noctuidae
- Genus: Tiliacea
- Species: T. aurago

Binomial name
- Tiliacea aurago (Denis & Schiffermüller, 1775)

Synonyms
- Xanthia aurago; Noctua aurago

= Tiliacea aurago =

Species of moth

The barred Sallow (Tiliacea aurago) is a moth of the family Noctuidae. It is found in Europe.

== Technical description and variation ==
C. aurago F. (= praetexta Esp.) (24 h). Forewing yellow, deeper in female than male, the basal area greyish purple, limited by the wavy yellow inner line, and yellow itself at costa; terminal area beyond the yellow outer line greyish purple, traversed by an interrupted yellow subrnarginal line, sometimes swollen at apex; orbicular and reniform stigmata purplish, diffuse and ill-defined, the former round; traces of a curved median line; hindwing yellow, reddish towards termen; in rutilago F. (24 h) the ground colour is deep orange, with scarcely a trace of stigmata, the base of the basal area and the broader submarginal line also deep dull orange; — another form, quite as common apparently as the typical, has the yellow central area thickly mottled with orange, ab. marmorata ab. nov. [Warren] (24 h) ; lutea Tutt is a rare form in which the whole forewing is pale yellow, with only the lines greyish-purple ; two other, more or less unicolorous, forms are found ; one in which the orange ground colour overpowers the purplish and spreads over the whole wing, ab. unicolor Tutt, the other, fucata Esp. (24 i), (= ? virgata Tutt) is more or less wholly purplish ferruginous, with the terminal area showing still darker. In all the forms, owing to their deeper ground colour, the females show the difference between the two colours less. Larva red-brown, paler, somewhat greenish, in front; dorsal line whitish, interrupted at the segments, edged with dark; tubercular dots pale, inconspicuous. The wingspan is 27–32 mm.

== Similar species ==
- Xanthia icteritia
- Xanthia togata

== Biology ==
The moth flies from September to October depending on the location.

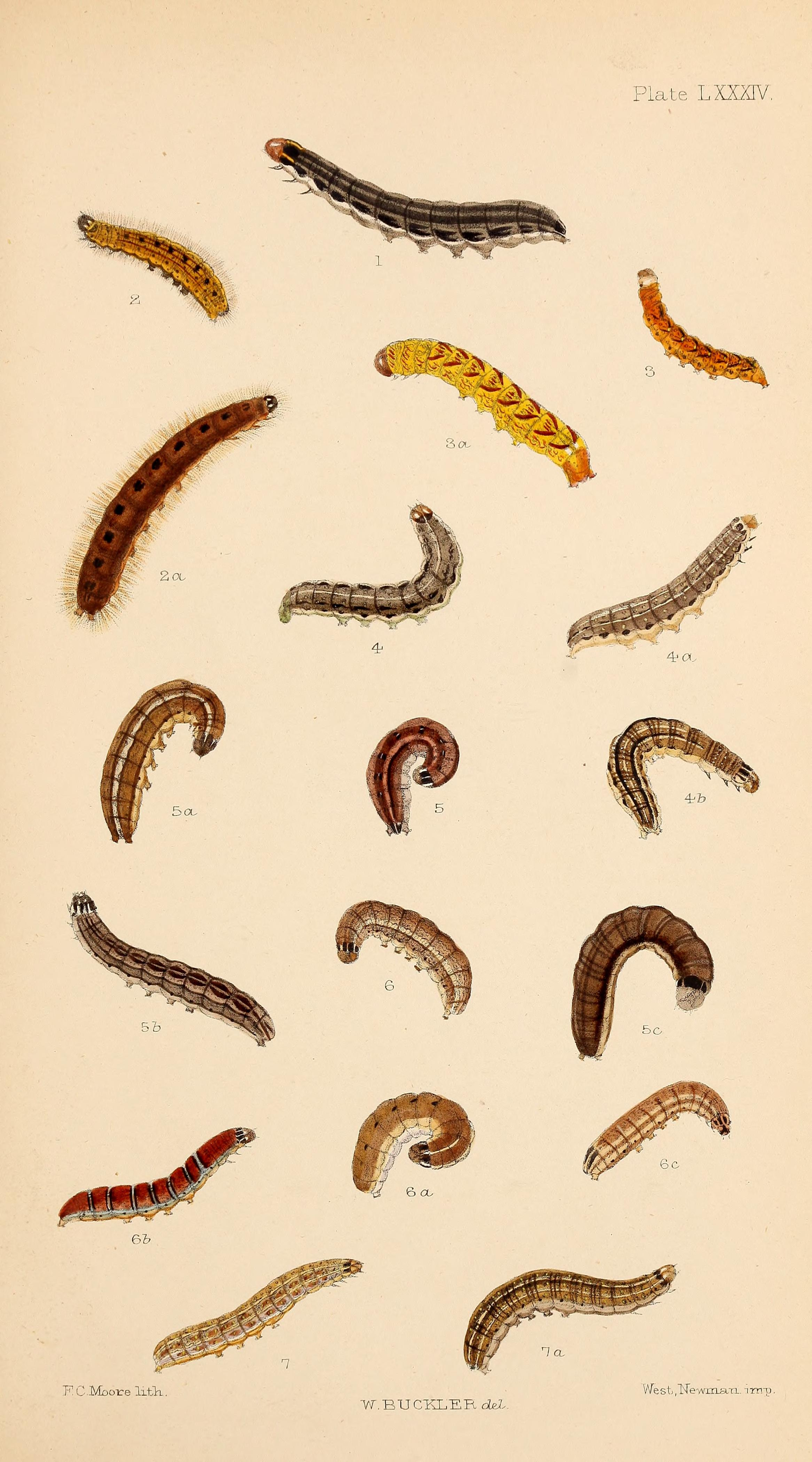
Figs 7, 7a larvae after final moult

The larvae feed on beech and Acer campestre , at first on the flowers, then between united leaves, and finally on the ground.
