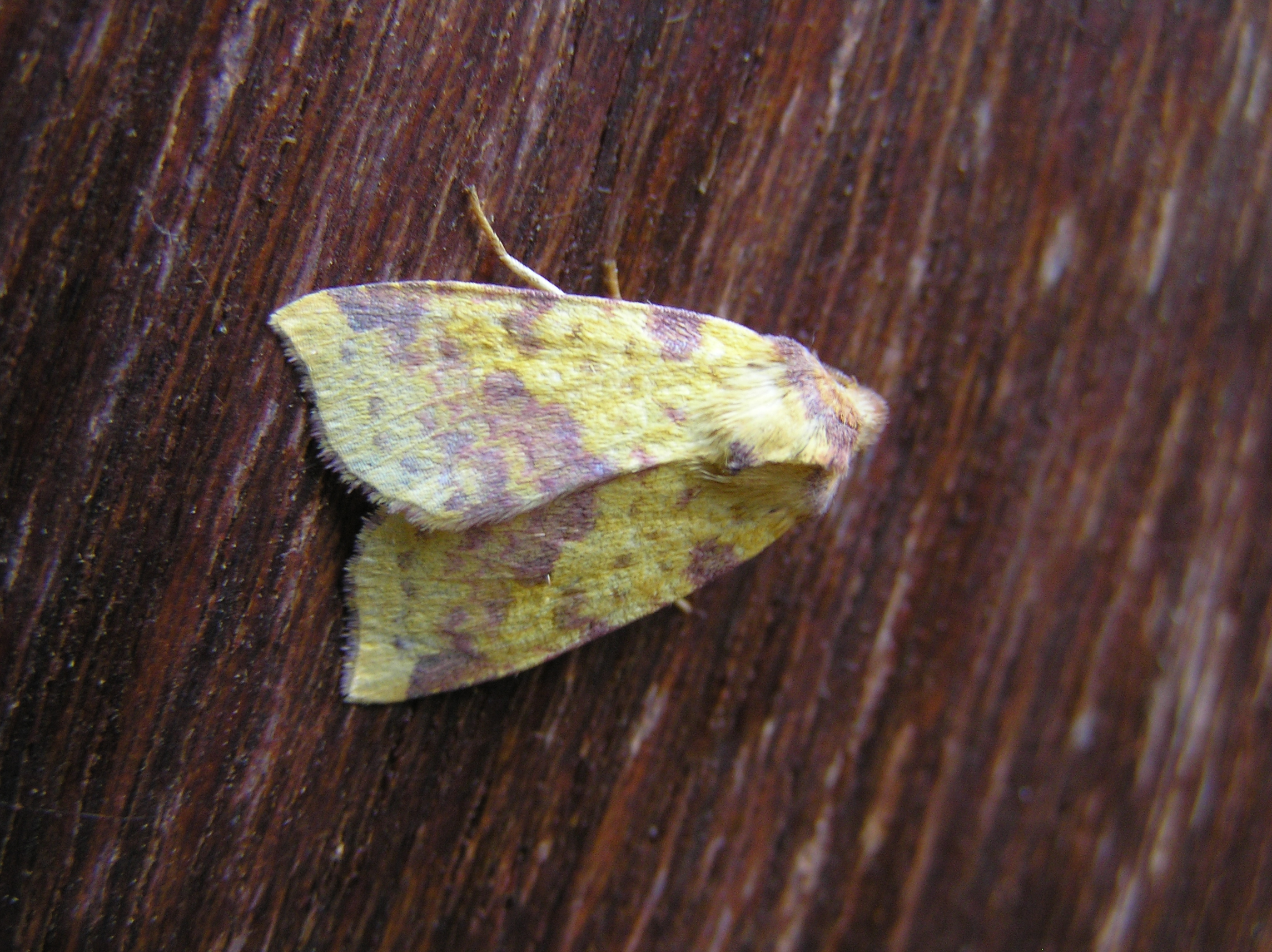

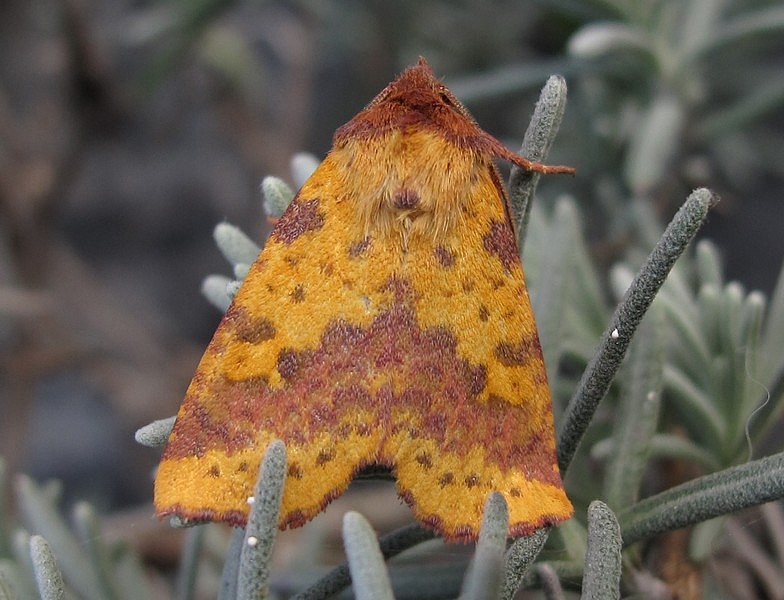

Scientific classification
- Kingdom: Animalia
- Phylum: Arthropoda
- Class: Insecta
- Order: Lepidoptera
- Superfamily: Noctuoidea
- Family: Noctuidae
- Genus: Xanthia
- Species: X. togata

Binomial name
- Xanthia togata (Esper, 1788)

= Xanthia togata =

Pink-barred sallow

Species of moth

Xanthia togata, the pink-barred sallow, is a species of moth of the family Noctuidae. It is a Holarctic species, and is found throughout Europe and east through the Palearctic to Central Asia, and Siberia up to the Ussuri. The distribution area includes the United States and Canada. It was first described by the German entomologist Eugenius Johann Christoph Esper in 1788 from the type specimen in Germany

== Life-cycle ==
=== Imago ===
Forewing deep yellow, the markings purplish brown; a blotch on costa beyond basal line; inner line wavy, interrupted; median shade curved, interrupted; outer line double, lunulate dentate, the space including median and outer lines shaded with purplish; orbicular stigma yellow, marked only by one or two reddish points; reniform yellow with its upper part slightly and its lower completely marked with purplish; the interval between the stigmata a purplish blotch; submarginal line indicated only by purplish spots; fringe yellow chequered with purplish; hindwing yellowish white, more yellow along termen, often showing a dark grey outer line; ochreago Bkh. [Type] differs only in having a red central band instead of the purplish brown one, —in togata Esp. [Type] the median and double outer lines remain clear without any dark suffusion. The wingspan is 27–30 mm. and the length of the forewings is 13–16 mm. The ground colour of the forewings is deep yellow. There is a purple, variable in width median fascia extending from the costa. Antemedian and post median lines are reduced to purple dots. The irregular subterminal line is also reduced to a series of small dark dots. The hindwings are pale yellowish white, darker in the outer field. Very similar to Xanthia icteritia but the median fascia is complete and togata is distinguished from the icteritia by the purple pigmentation of the head and shoulders. It also resembles Xanthia aurago.

== Biology ==
The moth flies from August to October depending on the location.

=== Ova ===
The pale-brown eggs are a flattened sphere, with relatively few ribs which are more prominent above the equator. They are laid in small rows and inserted behind the buds of sallows (Salix species) or poplar (Populus species). The moth overwinters as an egg.

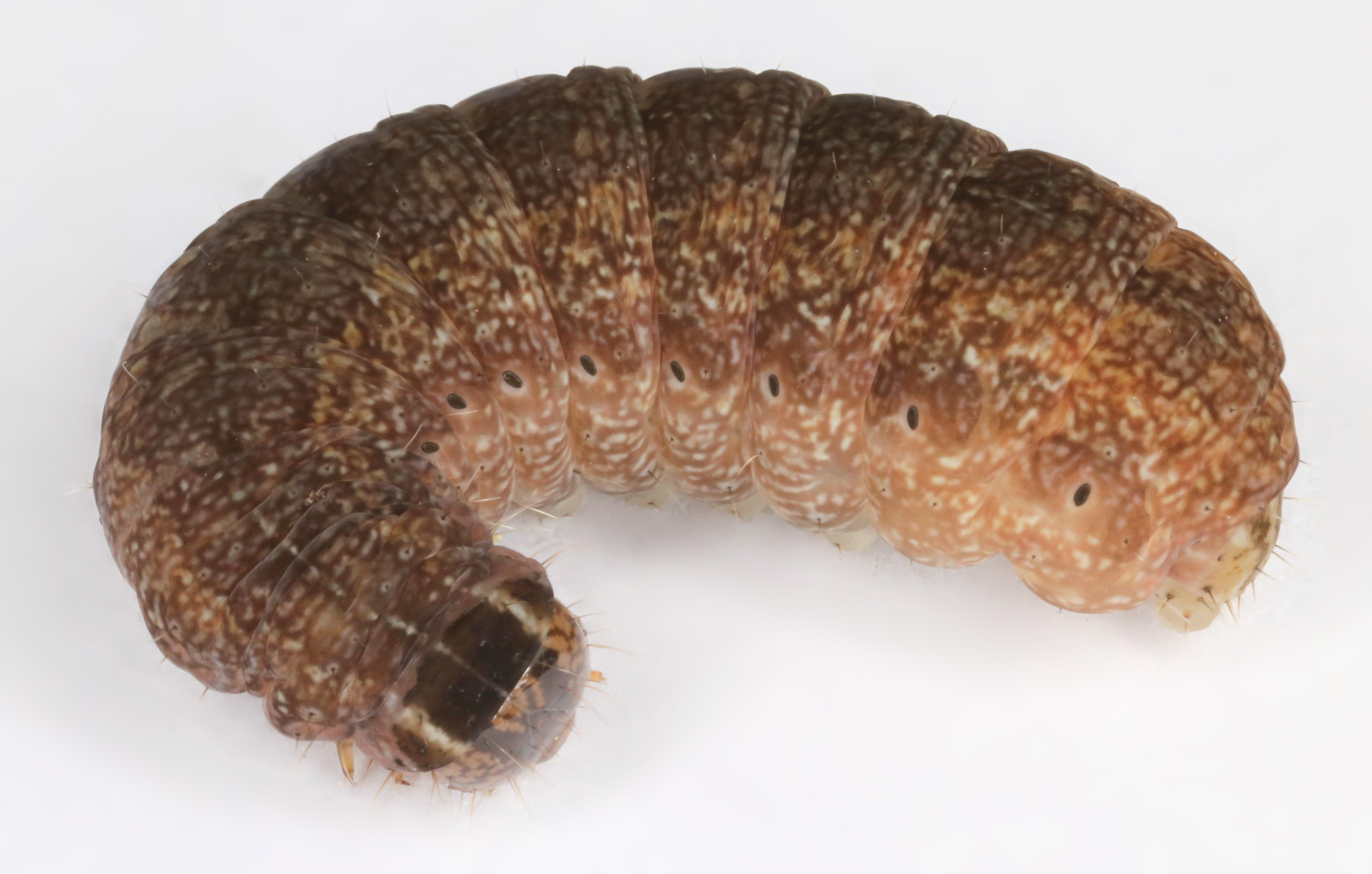
Larva

=== Larva ===
Larva brownish grey, dotted with red and yellow; dorsal line pale, with darker edges, but obscure; spiracular line broadly pale. They feed at first in the catkins, which are usually the first to fall. The later instars feeds on the leaves of herbaceous plants. Before pupating the larva aestivates for a few weeks. The larva is similar to the sallow (X. icteritia) and should be bred for confirmation.
