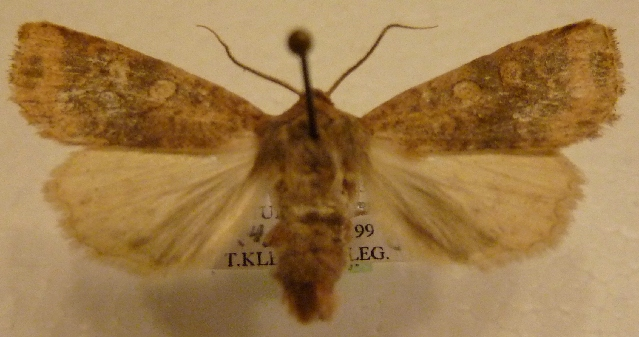

Scientific classification
- Kingdom: Animalia
- Phylum: Arthropoda
- Class: Insecta
- Order: Lepidoptera
- Superfamily: Noctuoidea
- Family: Noctuidae
- Genus: Xanthia
- Species: X. gilvago

Binomial name
- Xanthia gilvago (Denis & Schiffermüller, 1775)

= Xanthia gilvago =

Species of moth

Xanthia gilvago, the dusky-lemon sallow, is a moth of the family Noctuidae. The species was first described by Michael Denis and Ignaz Schiffermüller in 1775. It is found in Europe.

== Technical description and variation ==
Forewing deep yellow ochreous with a brownish flush; markings all blackish; inner and outer lines double; the former oblique, outwardly lunulate, its inner arm thick and blotchy; the latter inwardly lunulate, concise, the outer arm thick; submarginal line a row of dark spots preceded by a dark costal blotch attached to outer line, and followed by a diffuse dark shade; median shade blackish, thick and diffuse; orbicular stigma of the ground colour with a dark ring, separated by the median shade from the equally pale reniform which has its lower lobe black; fringe concolorous mottled with dark; hindwing yellowish, the inner marginal area grey; — when the brown tinge of forewing is intensified (sometimes darkening the whole wing), and the dark markings likewise, forming a partially continuous dark band from median shade to outer line, we have the ab. suffusa Tutt (28 g); — on the other hand the yellow tinge may be nearby absent, the ground colour becoming olive grey, and the markings dark grey, the hindwing whitish; this is ab. griseosignata Spul. (28 g); a rarer form — cinnamomeago Spul. (28 h), — has the ground colour uniform fulvous, with the markings finer, those of the terminal area, and often those of the basal area also, more or less obsolete, the hindwing deeper yellow; — lastly from the Goorais Valley, Kashmir, there is a paler ochreous form of which the extreme development, ab. derasa ab. nov. (= ab. 2 Hmps.) [unknown taxon not gilvago] is wholly pale ochreous with only the lower half of reniform and the fringe dark brown, exactly corresponding to the unmarked form flavescens of fulvago L. Larva pinkish brown; dorsal and subdorsal lines pale, dark-edged; a dorsal series of dark Y-shaped marks; spiracular line pale. The wingspan is 32–38 mm.

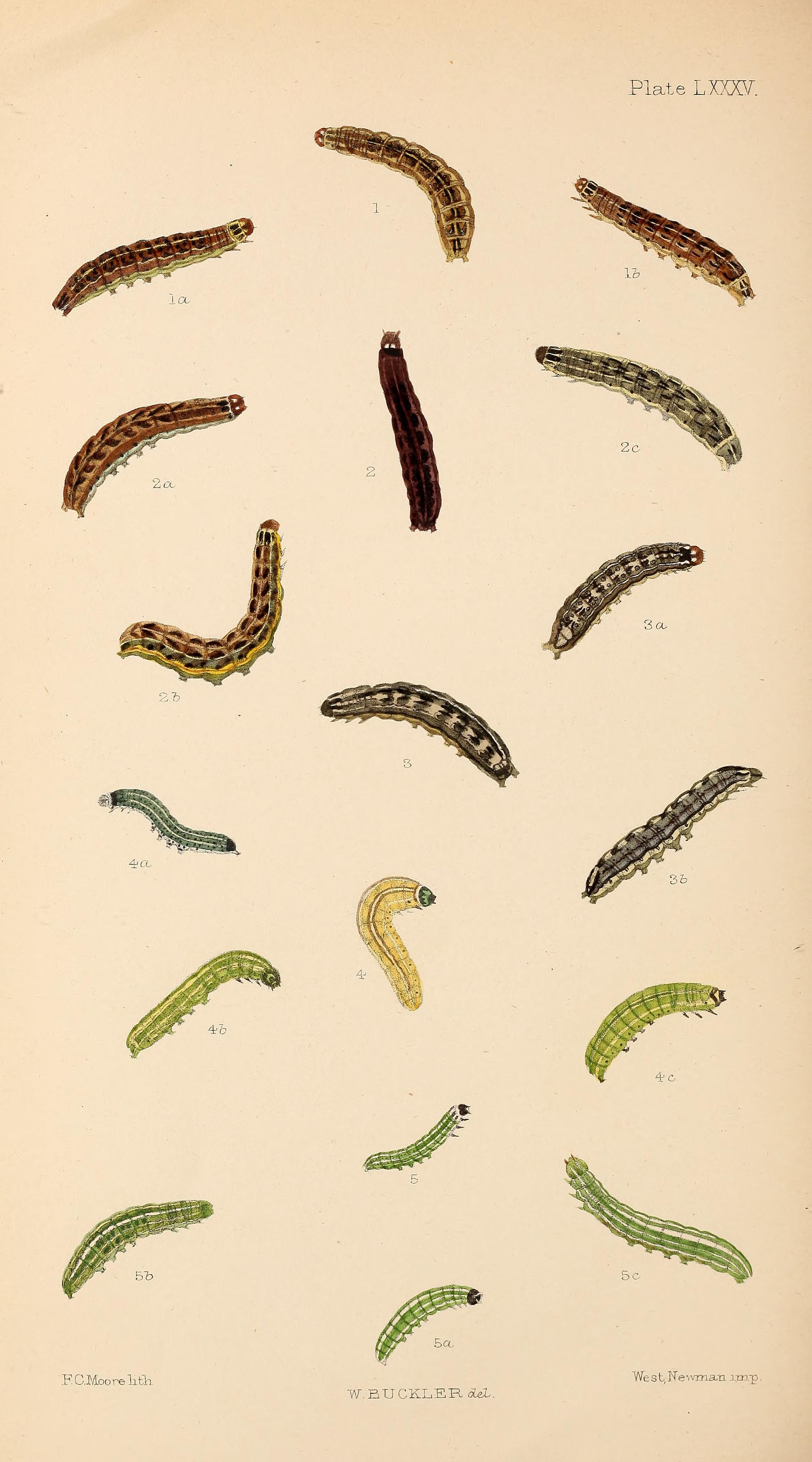
Figs 1, 1a, 1b larvae after final moult

== Biology ==
The moth flies from August to October depending on the location.

The larvae feed on English elm (Ulmus minor 'Atinia').
