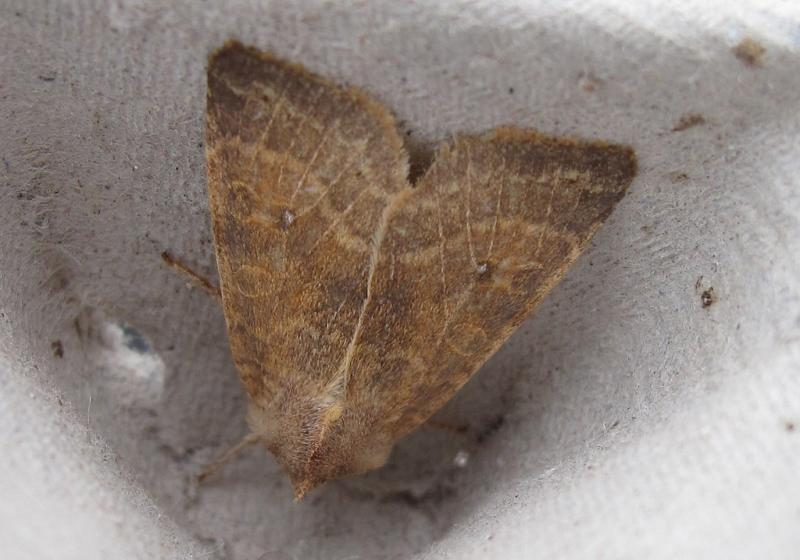

Scientific classification
- Kingdom: Animalia
- Phylum: Arthropoda
- Class: Insecta
- Order: Lepidoptera
- Superfamily: Noctuoidea
- Family: Noctuidae
- Genus: Xanthia
- Species: X. ocellaris

Binomial name
- Xanthia ocellaris (Borkhausen, 1792)

= Xanthia ocellaris =

Species of moth

The pale-lemon sallow (Xanthia ocellaris) is a moth of the family Noctuidae. It is found from Europe to Anatolia and Morocco.

C. ocellaris Bkh. (28 h). Forewing pale yellowish grey, more or less strongly tinged with reddish grey; the inner and outer lines pale, slightly darker-edged; median shade dark grey, diffuse; submarginal line pale, preceded by a row of dark dots, often faint or obsolete, except that above vein 6; fringe rufous; stigmata with pale grey-edged annuli, the reniform with a whitish, dark-edged dot at lower extremity; hindwing whitish, the inner marginal third pinkish grey; — the pale form without any red tinge is palleago Hbn. fig. 192 (28 h); — ab. carneago ab. nov. (28 i) is pink, only the basal and terminal areas faintly greyish, the markings very faint, and the fringe pink; — lineago Guen. (= gilvago Hbn. fig. 193) (28 h, i) has the forewing more thickly and darkly suffused with grey, the pale veins and markings coming out more prominently; — intermedia Habich is said to be transitional between typical ocellaris and gilvago; it may be, I think, the same as the yellower form of palleago Hbn. fig. 442; and if so, would supplant the name erythrago for the preceding species. Larva yellowish grey; the dorsal and subdorsal lines fine and faint; spiracular line broadly white. The wingspan is 32–36 mm.

== Biology ==
There is one generation per year, with adults on wing from August to October depending on the location.

The larvae feed on poplar feeding in the catkins at first, afterwards on the ground on fallen leaves and low plants

Larvae can be found from April to June. It overwinters as an egg.
