= Tiliacea =

Scientific classification
- Domain: Eukaryota
- Kingdom: Animalia
- Phylum: Arthropoda
- Class: Insecta
- Order: Lepidoptera
- Superfamily: Noctuoidea
- Family: Noctuidae
- Subtribe: Xylenina
- Genus: Tiliacea; Tutt, 1896

Genus of moths

Tiliacea is a genus of moths of the family Noctuidae.

== Species ==
- Tiliacea aculeata Hreblay & Ronkay, 1997
- Tiliacea auragides (Draudt, 1950)
- Tiliacea aurago – Barred Sallow (Denis & Schiffermüller, 1775)
- Tiliacea citrago (Linnaeus, 1758)
- Tiliacea cypreago (Hampson, 1906)
- Tiliacea glaucozona Hreblay, Peregovits & Ronkay, 1999
- Tiliacea japonago (Wileman & West, 1929)
- Tiliacea melonina (Butler, 1889)
- Tiliacea sulphurago (Denis & Schiffermüller, 1775)
- Tiliacea tatachana Chang, 1991
- Tiliacea tigrina (Kononenko, 1978)
- Tiliacea yunnana Chen, 1999
