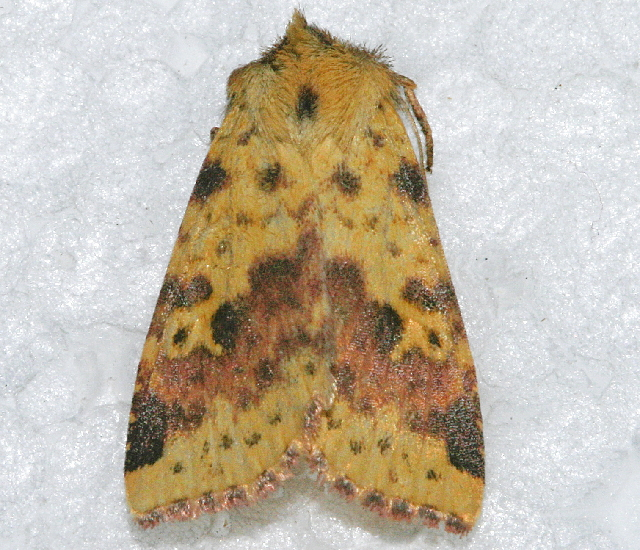

Scientific classification
- Domain: Eukaryota
- Kingdom: Animalia
- Phylum: Arthropoda
- Class: Insecta
- Order: Lepidoptera
- Superfamily: Noctuoidea
- Family: Noctuidae
- Tribe: Xylenini
- Subtribe: Xylenina
- Genus: Xanthia
- Species: X. tatago

Binomial name
- Xanthia tatago Lafontaine & Mikkola, 2003

= Xanthia tatago =

Species of moth

Xanthia tatago, the pink-barred sallow, is a species of cutworm or dart moth in the family Noctuidae. It is found in North America.

The MONA or Hodges number for Xanthia tatago is 9965.
