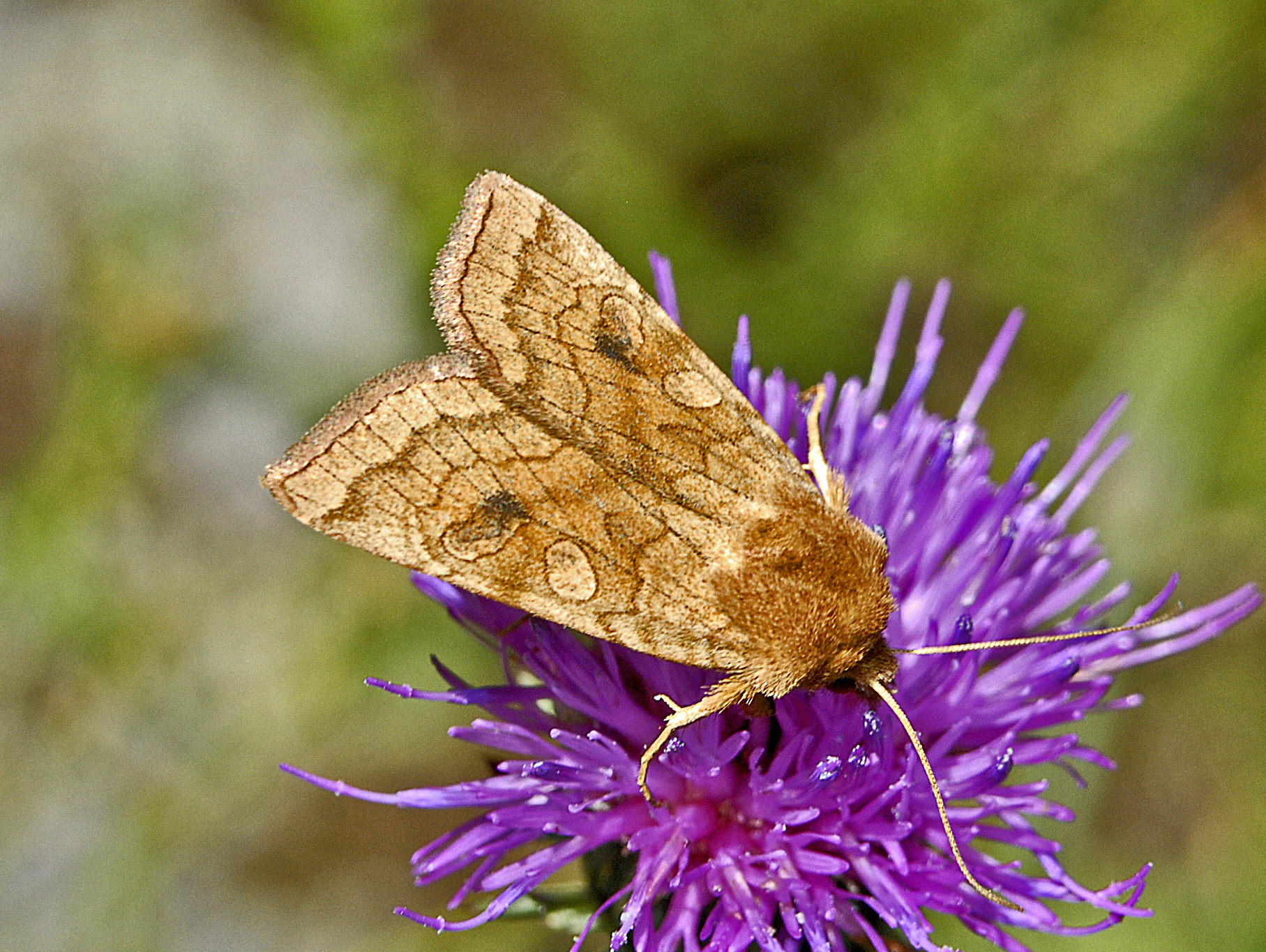
- Xestia ochreago

Scientific classification
- Kingdom: Animalia
- Phylum: Arthropoda
- Class: Insecta
- Order: Lepidoptera
- Superfamily: Noctuoidea
- Family: Noctuidae
- Genus: Xestia
- Species: X. ochreago

Binomial name
- Xestia ochreago (Hübner, 1790)

Synonyms
- Phalaena (Noctua) ochreago Hübner, 1790; Xestia ochrojois Hübner, [1821]; Xestia rubecula Treitschke, 1837; Xestia habichi Rebel, 1909; Xestia pallida Schuring, 1918

= Xestia ochreago =

Species of moth

The Phalaena (Noctua) ochreago invalidly described by Esper in 1791 is Tiliacea citrago.

Xestia ochreago is a moth of the family Noctuidae.

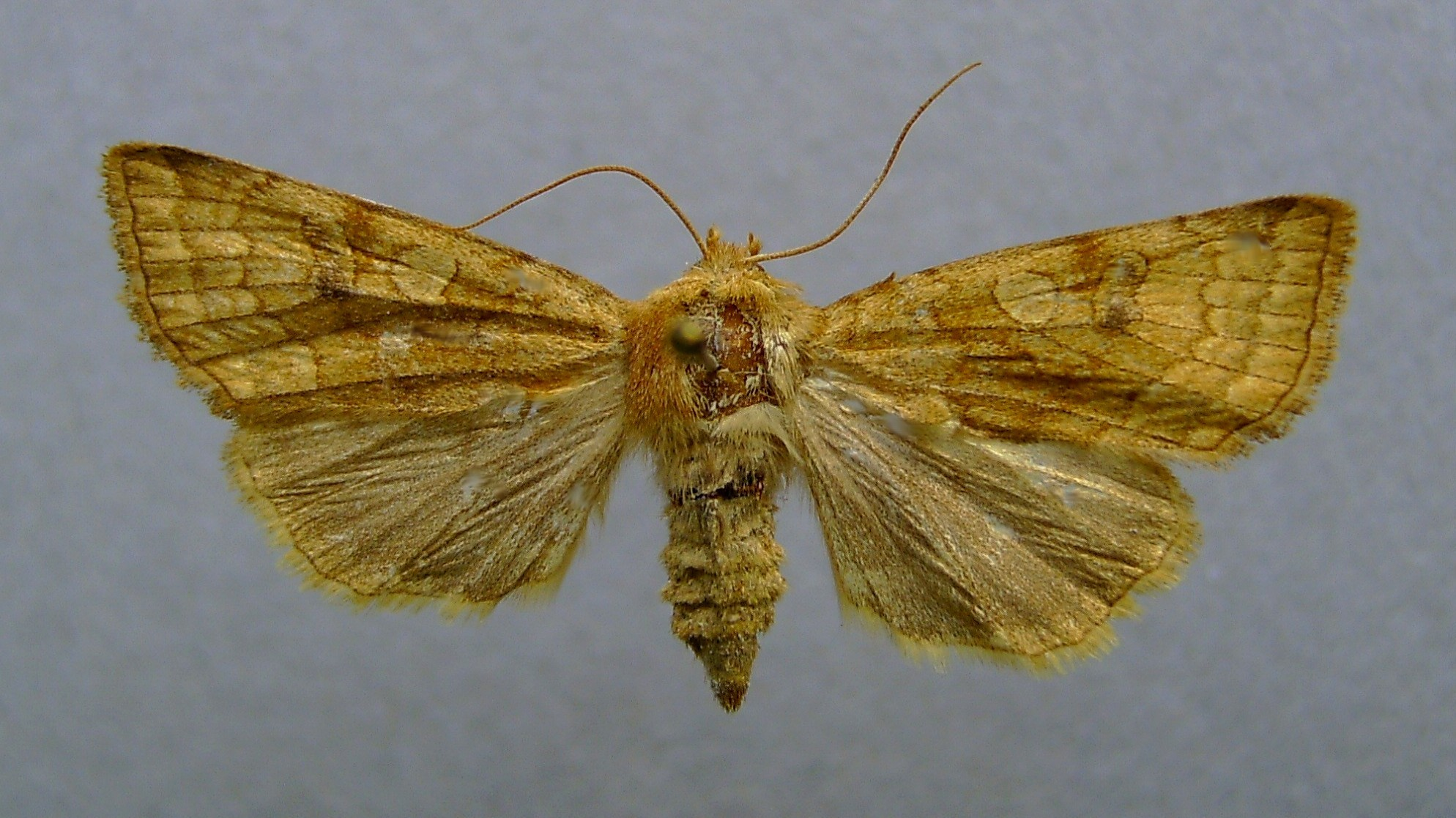
Xestia ochreago. Mounted specimen

== Description ==
Xestia ochreago has a wingspan of 37–39 mm. The forewings are basically yellowish or pale brown, with transversal wavy dark brown lines and with yellowish rings surrounded by darker fine lines. At the lower rim of the kidney shaped ring there is a characteristic brownish stain. The hind wings are greyish or pale brown.

== Biology ==
Adults are mainly day-active and are on wing from the end of June to August in one generation per year. Adults are found on flowers of Scabiosa, Adenostyles and Cirsium spinosissimum. The larvae feed on various plants, including Verbascum and Tussilago farfara. This species overwinters as a caterpillar.

== Distribution and habitat ==
This species is found in the Mediterranean and Asia. In Europe it is found in the mountains of Spain, the mountains in the eastern Balkan and the Alps. It is found up to heights of 2,500 meters.

== Bibliography ==
- LepIndex: The Global Lepidoptera Names Index. Beccaloni G.W., Scoble M.J., Robinson G.S. & Pitkin B.
- Michael Fibiger: Noctuinae II. In: W. G. Tremewan (Hrsg.): Noctuidae Europaeae. 1. Auflage. Band 2, Entomological Press, Sorø 1993, ISBN 87-89430-02-6.
- W. Forster, T. A. Wohlfahrt: Die Schmetterlinge Mitteleuropas, Band IV, Eulen. Franckh'sche Verlagshandlung, Stuttgart 1971
- Erstbeschreibung: HÜBNER, J. [1800-1838]: Sammlung europäischer Schmetterlinge 4: pl. 1-185
