= Tiliacea sulphurago =

Scientific classification
- Domain: Eukaryota
- Kingdom: Animalia
- Phylum: Arthropoda
- Class: Insecta
- Order: Lepidoptera
- Superfamily: Noctuoidea
- Family: Noctuidae
- Genus: Tiliacea
- Species: T. sulphurago

Binomial name
- Tiliacea sulphurago (Denis & Schiffermuller, 1775)

Species of moth

Tiliacea sulphurago is a species of moth belonging to the family Noctuidae.

It is native to Southern Europe.
