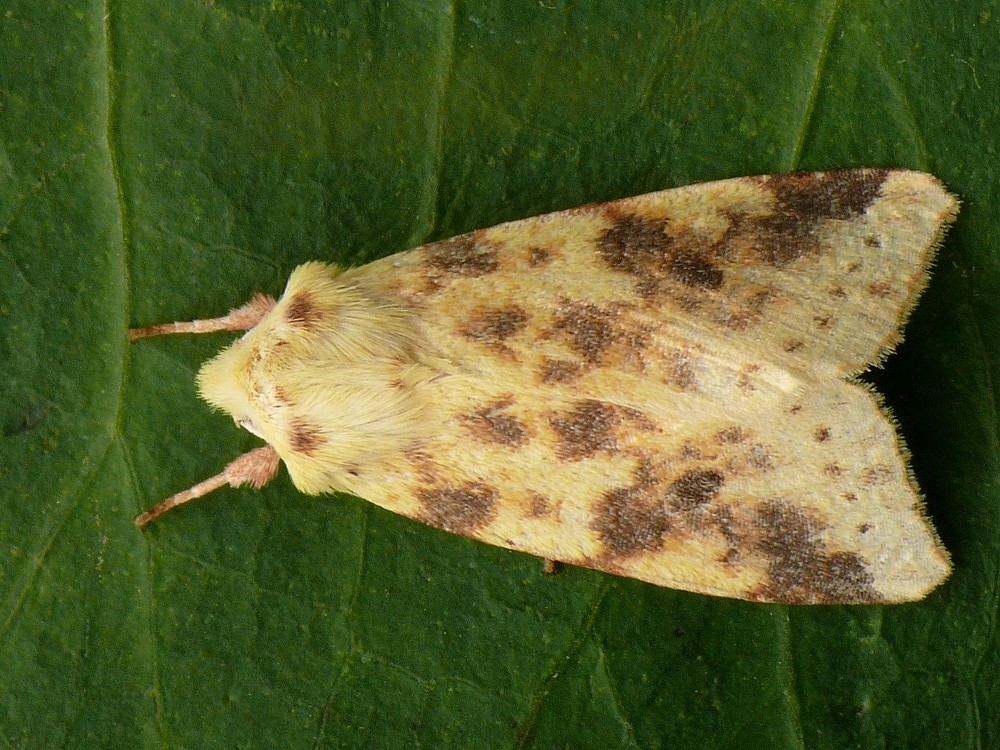
- Xanthia icteritia

Scientific classification
- Domain: Eukaryota
- Kingdom: Animalia
- Phylum: Arthropoda
- Class: Insecta
- Order: Lepidoptera
- Superfamily: Noctuoidea
- Family: Noctuidae
- Subtribe: Xylenina
- Genus: Xanthia; Ochsenheimer, 1816

= Xanthia =

Genus of moths

Xanthia is a genus of moths of the family Noctuidae.

== Species ==
- Xanthia approximata (Hampson, 1906)
- Xanthia aurantiago (Draudt, 1950)
- Xanthia austauti Oberthür, 1881
- Xanthia basalis Walker, 1862
- Xanthia cirphidiago (Draudt, 1950)
- Xanthia fasciata (Kononenko, 1978)
- Xanthia gilvago – Dusky-Lemon Sallow Denis & Schiffermüller, 1775
- Xanthia icteritia – The Sallow Hufnagel, 1766
- Xanthia ladakhensis Hacker & Ronkay, 1992
- Xanthia ledereri Staudinger, 1896
- Xanthia minor Felder & Rogenhofer, 1874
- Xanthia moderata Walker, 1869
- Xanthia ocellaris – Pale-Lemon Sallow Borkhausen, 1792
- Xanthia rectilineata Hampson, 1894
- Xanthia tatago Lafontaine & K. Mikkola, 2003
- Xanthia togata – Pink-barred Sallow Esper, 1788
- Xanthia tunicata Graeser, 1890
- Xanthia veterina Eversmann, 1855
- Xanthia xanthophylla Hreblay & Ronkay, 1998
