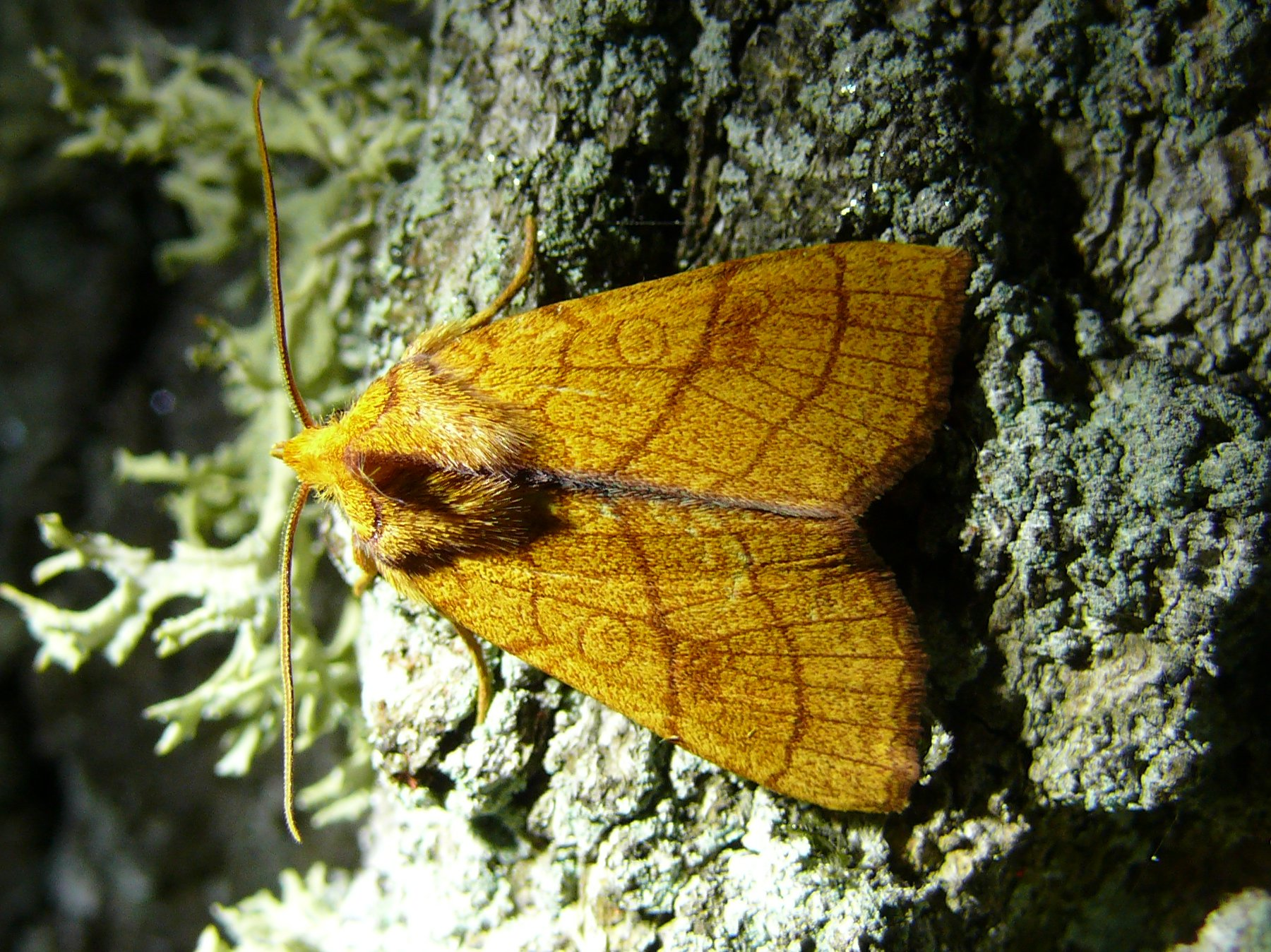

Scientific classification
- Kingdom: Animalia
- Phylum: Arthropoda
- Class: Insecta
- Order: Lepidoptera
- Superfamily: Noctuoidea
- Family: Noctuidae
- Genus: Tiliacea
- Species: T. citrago

Binomial name
- Tiliacea citrago (Linnaeus, 1758)

Synonyms
- Phalaena (Noctua) citrago Linnaeus, 1758; Phalaena (Noctua) ochreago Esper, 1791 (non Hübner, 1790: preoccupied); Phalaena (Noctua) fulvago Esper, 1805; Xanthia subflava Eversmann, 1848; Xanthia apennina Dannehl, 1933; Xanthia citrago (Linnaeus, 1758)

= Tiliacea citrago =

Orange sallow

Species of moth

Tiliacea citrago, the orange sallow, is a species of moth of the family Noctuidae. It is found in Europe as far east as the Caucasus Mountains and the Urals.

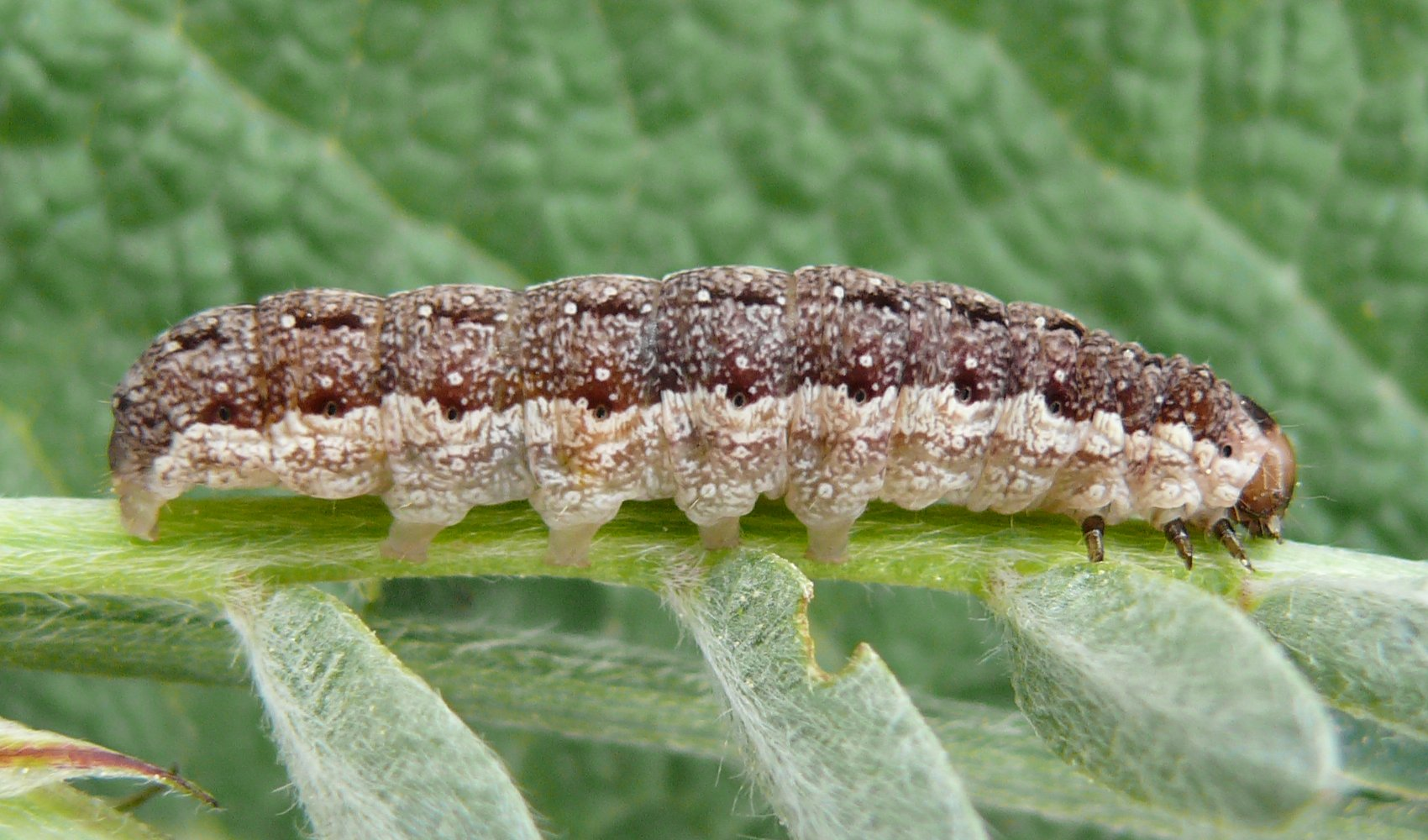
Caterpillar

== Technical description and variation ==
The wingspan is 28–33 mm. Forewing yellow, thickly freckled with orange; veins finely ferruginous; lines ferruginous brown, the median thick; all running more or less parallel to each other and to termen; the inner oblique outwards from costa to subcostal vein and again from vein 1 to inner margin where it touches the median; stigmata of the ground colour, with brown rings; the orbicular large, round; both with brown centres; submarginal line formed of disconnected pale lunules edged inwardly with darker; hindwing pale yellow;- aurantiago Tutt is a darker form, deeper orange, and sometimes darkened by grey dusting, occurring in Britain: incolorata equally meriting a distinctive name is a rare form, ab. incolorata ab. nov. [Warren] in which the ground colour is pure pale ochreous, without any orange freckling, the veins and lines faintly brownish, the stigmata all but obsolete; the fringe pale; hindwing white; I have seen only 1 example, a female, certainly British, but without exact locality; the form subflava Ev., from Denmark, the Baltic, St. Fetersburg, and the Ural Mts.; recorded also from Asia Minor, has quite a different appearance, the 3 lines, inner, outer, and submarginal being accompanied by brown bands of uniform width, the stigmata marked with brown, and the hindwing with brown veins and terminal border.

== Biology ==
The moth flies from August to October depending on the location.

Larva grey brown with a pink tinge; dorsal and subdorsal lines whitish; between them a black spot surrounded with white tubercles on each segment; spiracular stripe yellowish white, broad. The larvae feed on the leaf-buds and later the leaves of Tilia species, including Tilia cordata and Tilia platyphylla.
