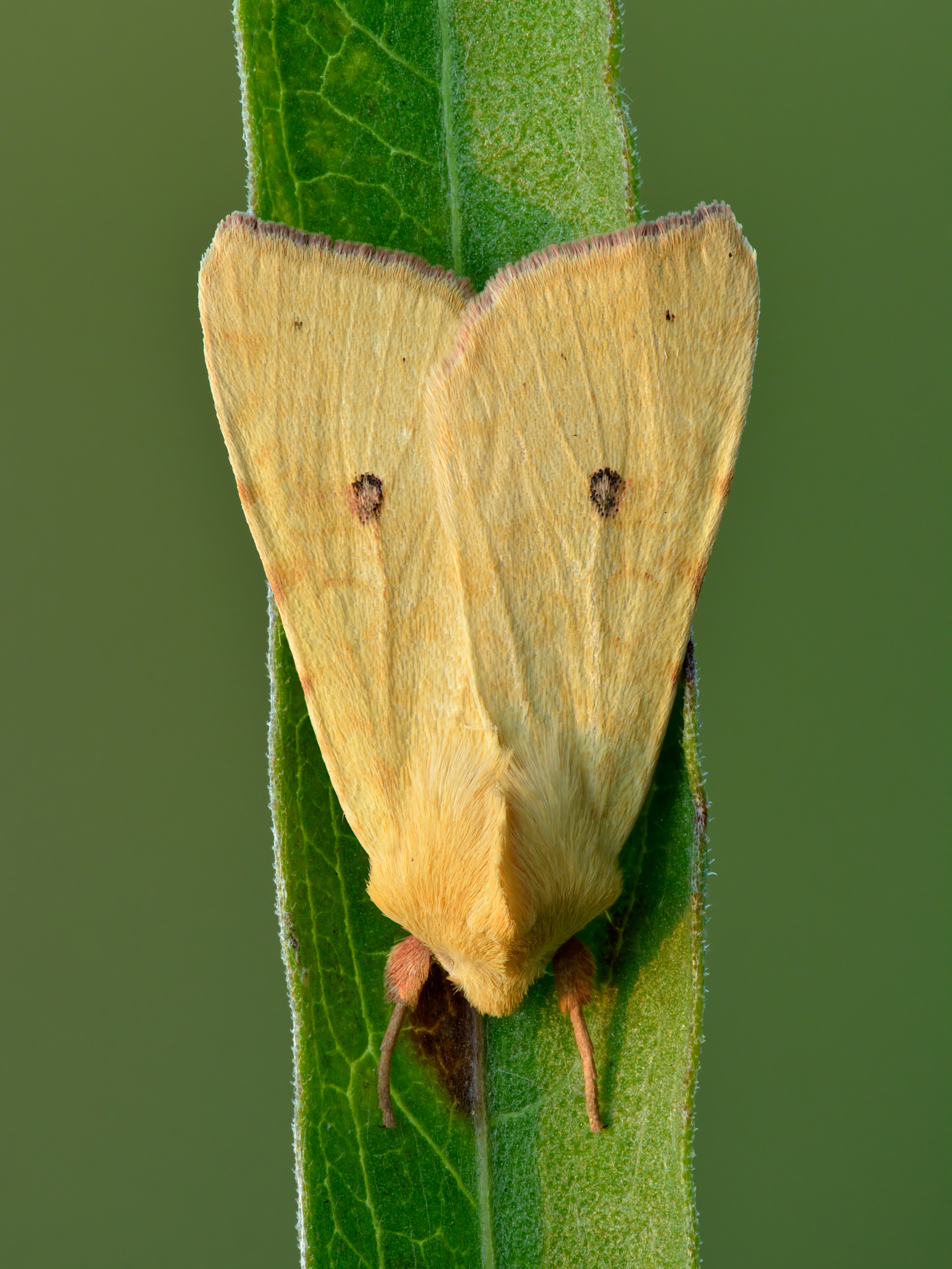

Scientific classification
- Kingdom: Animalia
- Phylum: Arthropoda
- Class: Insecta
- Order: Lepidoptera
- Superfamily: Noctuoidea
- Family: Noctuidae
- Genus: Xanthia
- Species: X. icteritia

Binomial name
- Xanthia icteritia (Hufnagel, 1766)

= Xanthia icteritia =

Species of moth

Xanthia icteritia, the sallow, is a moth of the family Noctuidae. It is found in the Palearctic realm (Europe except for the furthest south, and east to Central Asia, Korea, and Japan).

The wingspan is 27–35 mm. The moth is similar to the pink-barred sallow (Xanthia togata) but the median fascia usually differs. In some cases it is missing completely, in others the wings show a very small annular spot.

== Technical description and variation ==
Forewing pale yellow; markings the same as in Xanthia togata, but the cloud on costa beyond submarginal line, the costal end of the median shade, and the subbasal costal blotch prominently dark brown; the dark blotch at base of reniform with a pale centre; the fringe yellow; head and shoulders pale yellow; hindwing whitish; — flavescens Esp. is a unicolorous form in which all the brown lines and shading are absent, the lines and edges of the stigmata being sometimes represented by slender faint rufous lines, the lower end of the reniform stigma alone remaining deep brown and the fringes reddish brown; an intermediate form occurs in which the markings are pale reddish brown, either distinct or faint, and approaching; asiatica Hmps. from the Sir Daria, has more orange yellow forewings, with dark brown markings, the antemedian and postmedian costal patches absent; the fringe dark brown at tips.

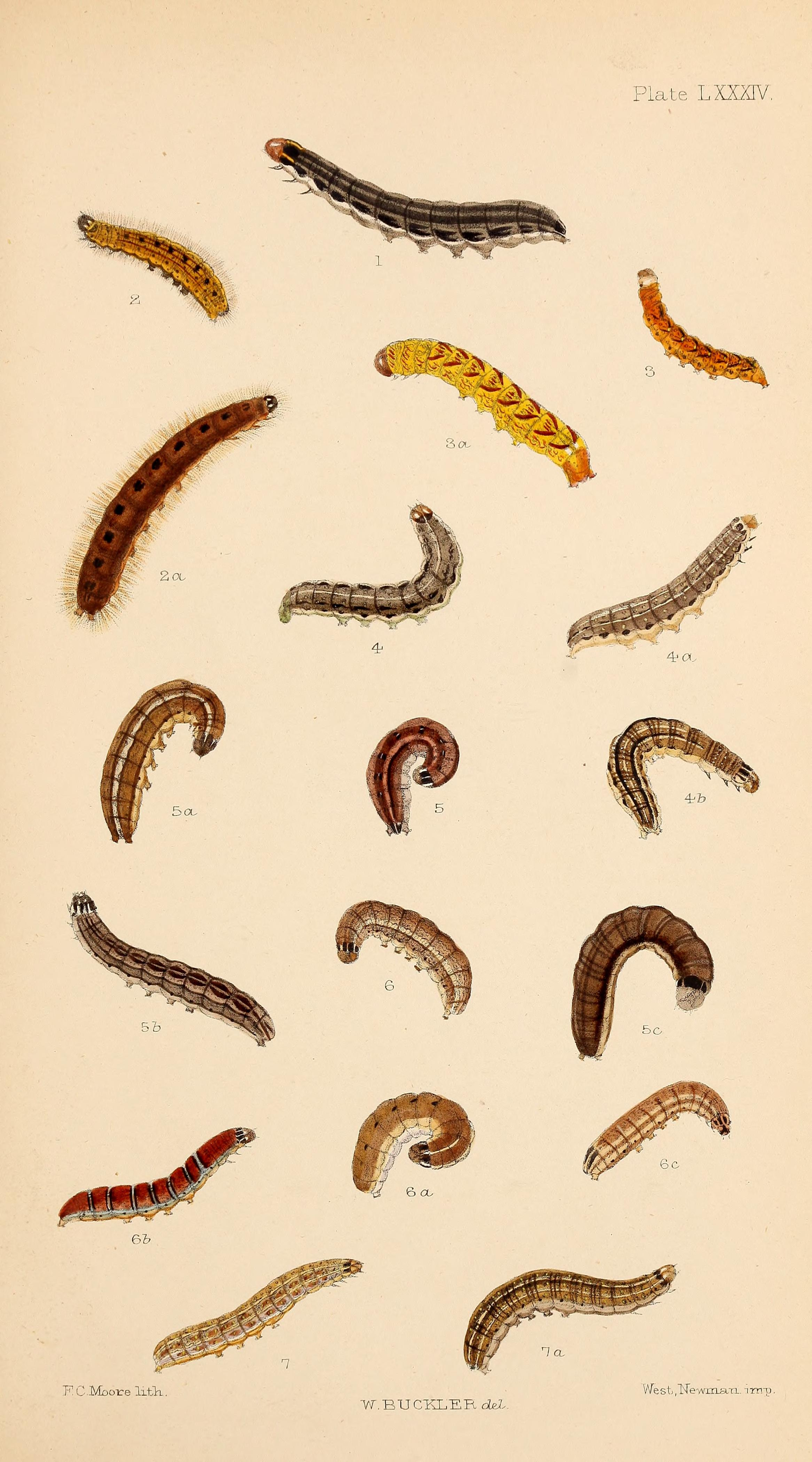
Figs 35, 5a, 5b 5c larvae after final moult (X. togata larvae after final moult 6, 6a, 6b 6 c)

== Biology ==
The moth flies from July to October depending on the location.

The larvae are difficult to tell apart from the pink-barred sallow (Xanthia togata) and the larvae feed on willow and poplar.
