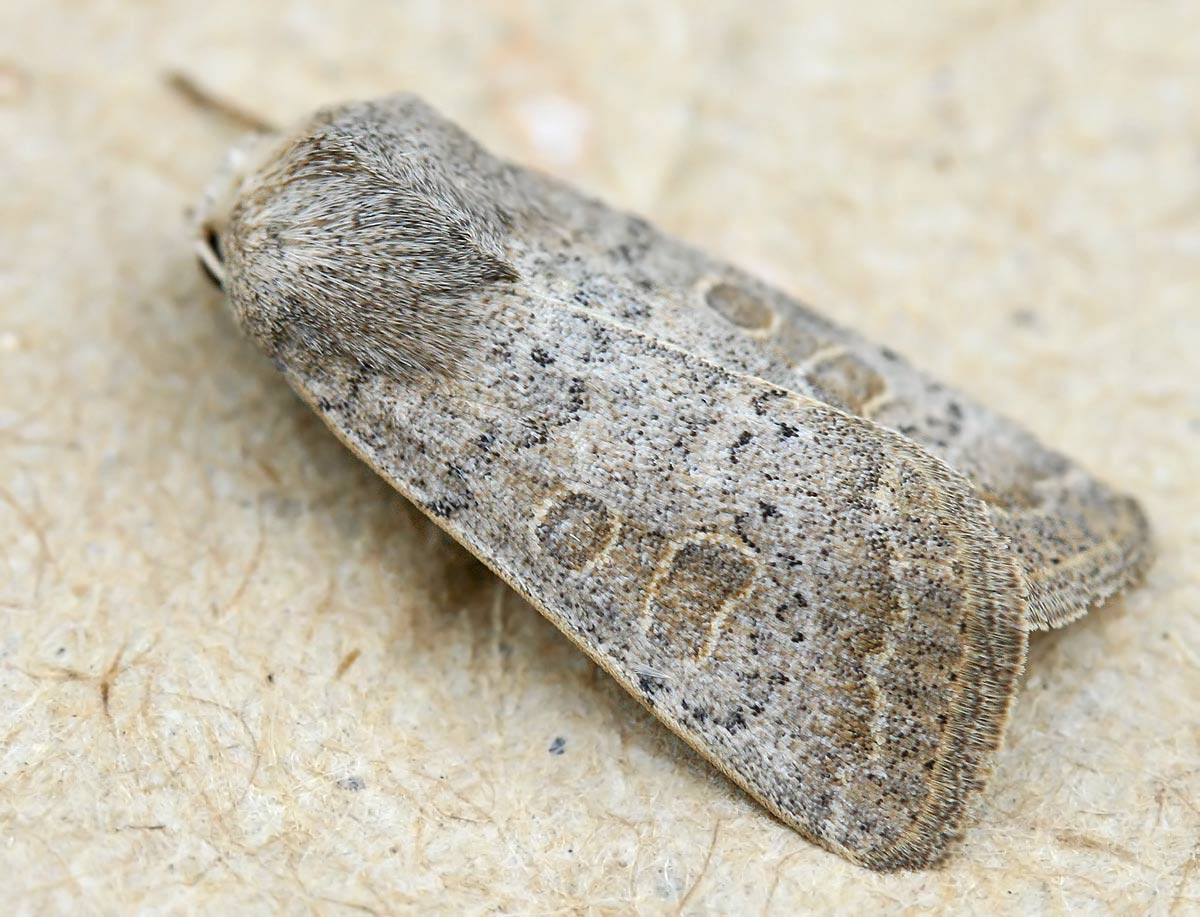

Scientific classification
- Domain: Eukaryota
- Kingdom: Animalia
- Phylum: Arthropoda
- Class: Insecta
- Order: Lepidoptera
- Superfamily: Noctuoidea
- Family: Noctuidae
- Genus: Hoplodrina
- Species: H. blanda

Binomial name
- Hoplodrina blanda (Denis & Schiffermüller, 1775)

= Hoplodrina blanda =

The rustic

Species of moth

Hoplodrina blanda (the rustic) is a moth of the family Noctuidae. It is found in the Palearctic realm (Europe, Morocco, Iran, Russia – south Urals, and southwest Siberia).

== Technical description and variation ==
The wingspan is 31–35 mm. The length of the forewings is 13–16 mm. Forewing fawn-tinged grey, with a fuscous suffusion, with the ground colour sometimes paler, more luteous ochreous, especially in examples from W. Turkestan; costal edge pale; inner and outer lines obscurely marked; the median and praesubmarginal shades distinct; stigmata fuscous grey, with pale annuli; hindwing whitish, grey-tinged towards termen; the veins and cell mark darker; altogether darker grey in the female. Occurs throughout Northern and Central Europe and in Central Asia. These Asiatic examples — from Issyk-Kul; the defile of Little Kisil-su, Tianshan; Kappak, Alexander Mts.; and Ketmen-tjube, Sussamyr Mts.; must be separated certainly as an ab. centralasiae ab. nov. [Warren] though very possibly a distinct species; the ground colour of the forewing is paler, tinged with pinkish brown along the two folds, and the dark markings stand out more conspicuously; the costal edge is pale; the hindwing, even in the female, is whiter, showing a distinct cell spot. Described from a series of more than a dozen males but only one female, from the above-mentioned localities; the type male from Kappak, the female from Ketmen-tjube. Similar to and confused with Hoplodrina octogenaria and Hoplodrina ambigua. Certain identification requires dissection of the genitalia.See Townsend et al.

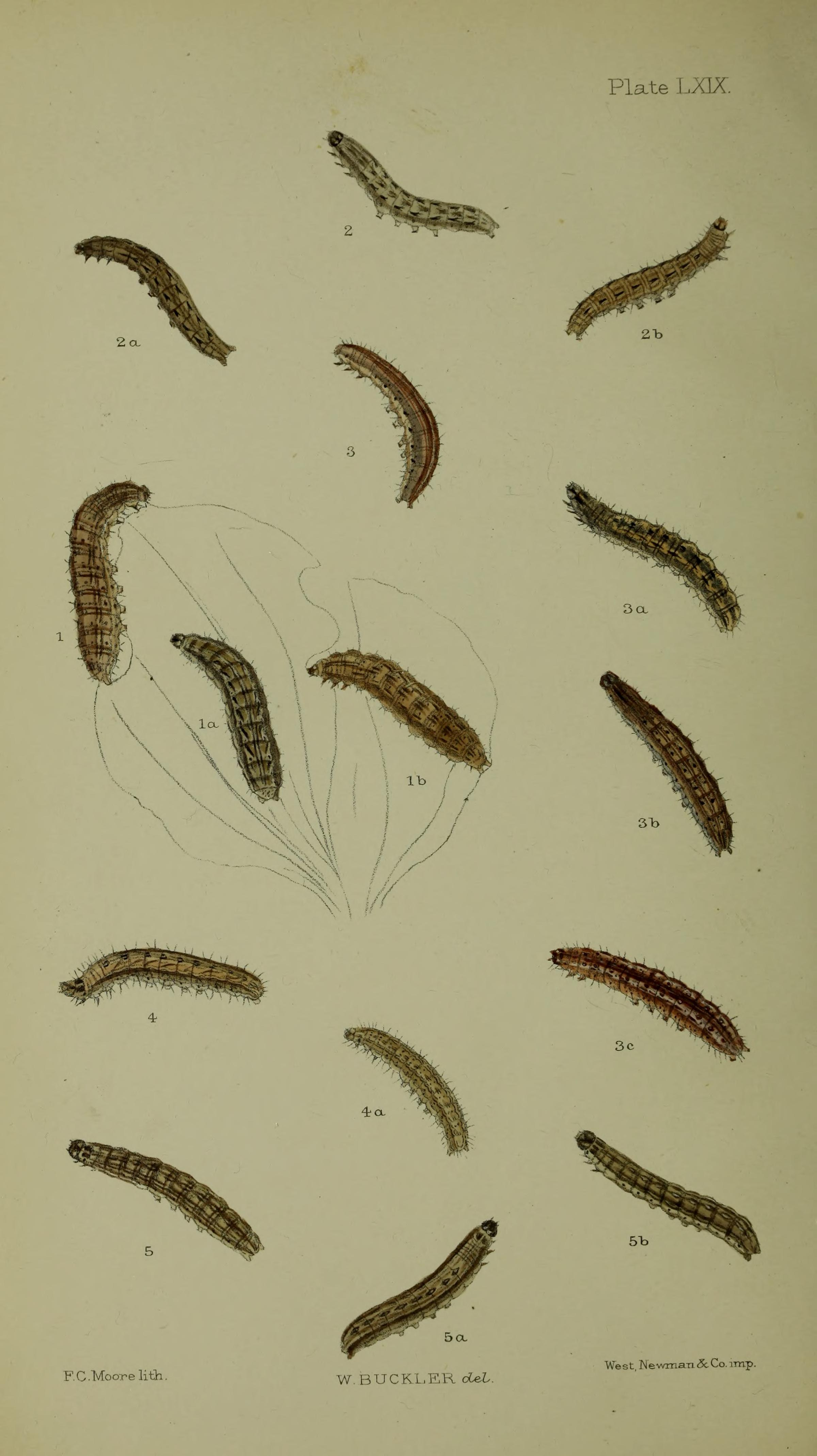
Figs 4, 4a larva after last moult

== Biology ==
The moth flies in one generation from late May to early September..

Larva ochreous with red or brown suffusion and dotted with dark; dorsal line yellowish edged with small black marks; subdorsal lines pale, dark-edged below; head pale marked with darker: on sundry low plants. The larvae feed on herbaceous plants such as Plantago, Stellaria and Rumex.

== Notes ==
1. The flight season refers to Belgium and the Netherlands. This may vary in other parts of the range.
