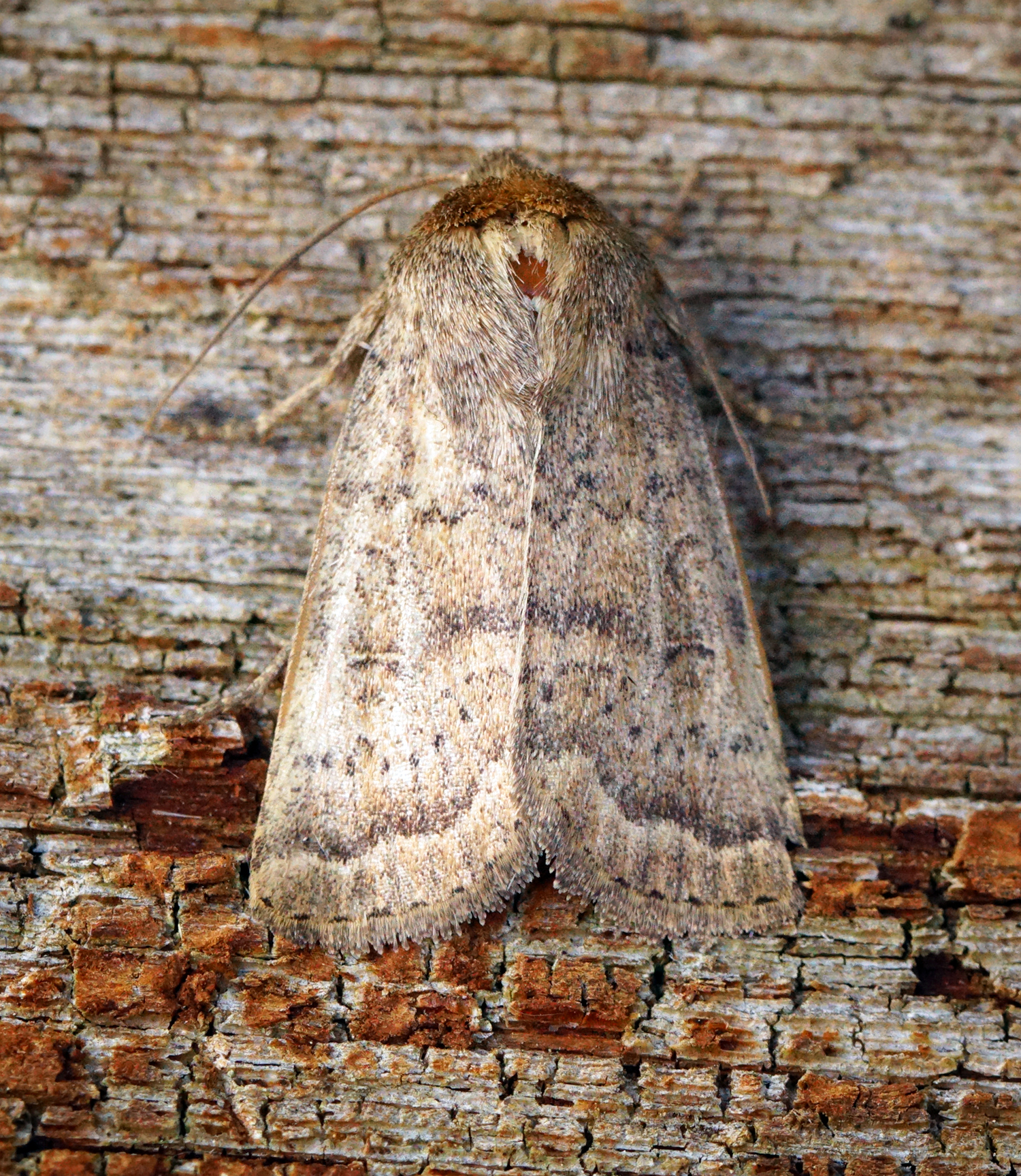

Scientific classification
- Domain: Eukaryota
- Kingdom: Animalia
- Phylum: Arthropoda
- Class: Insecta
- Order: Lepidoptera
- Superfamily: Noctuoidea
- Family: Noctuidae
- Genus: Hoplodrina
- Species: H. superstes

Binomial name
- Hoplodrina superstes (Ochsenheimer, 1816)

Synonyms
- Caradrina superstes Ochsenheimer, 1816

= Hoplodrina superstes =

Powdered rustic

Species of moth

Hoplodrina superstes, also known as the powdered rustic, is a moth of the family Noctuidae, first described by Ferdinand Ochsenheimer in 1816. It is found in Asia and Europe.

== Description ==
The wingspan is 28–34 mm. The forewings are yellowish brown to light grey brown and pale rufous grey with black atoms (scales); inner and outer lines blackish, the inner obliquely waved and dentate inwards, the outer strongly dentate, the teeth forming a row of points on the veins; submarginal pale, with brown shading before it; orbicular and reniform large, brownish, with pale rings; hindwing dull whitish, the veins and terminal area brownish. Larva grey, dorsal line dark; lateral stripes pale, with oblique streaks between them.[ full-grown larvae range from yellowish grey to reddish grey].

There is one generation per year in the northern part of the range, with adults on wing in June ando July. In the south, there are two generations. Adults of the second generation are on wing from August and September.

The larvae feed on dandelions (Taraxacum species), plantains (Plantago species), bedstraws (Galium species) and docks (Rumex species). The species overwinters in the larval stage.

== Distribution ==
It is common in central and southern Europe. In the north there is a population on Alderney. On the British mainland it is only present as a vagrant. In the east, the range extends to the Ural and in the south it ranges to Morocco, Turkey, Ukraine and northern Iran.
