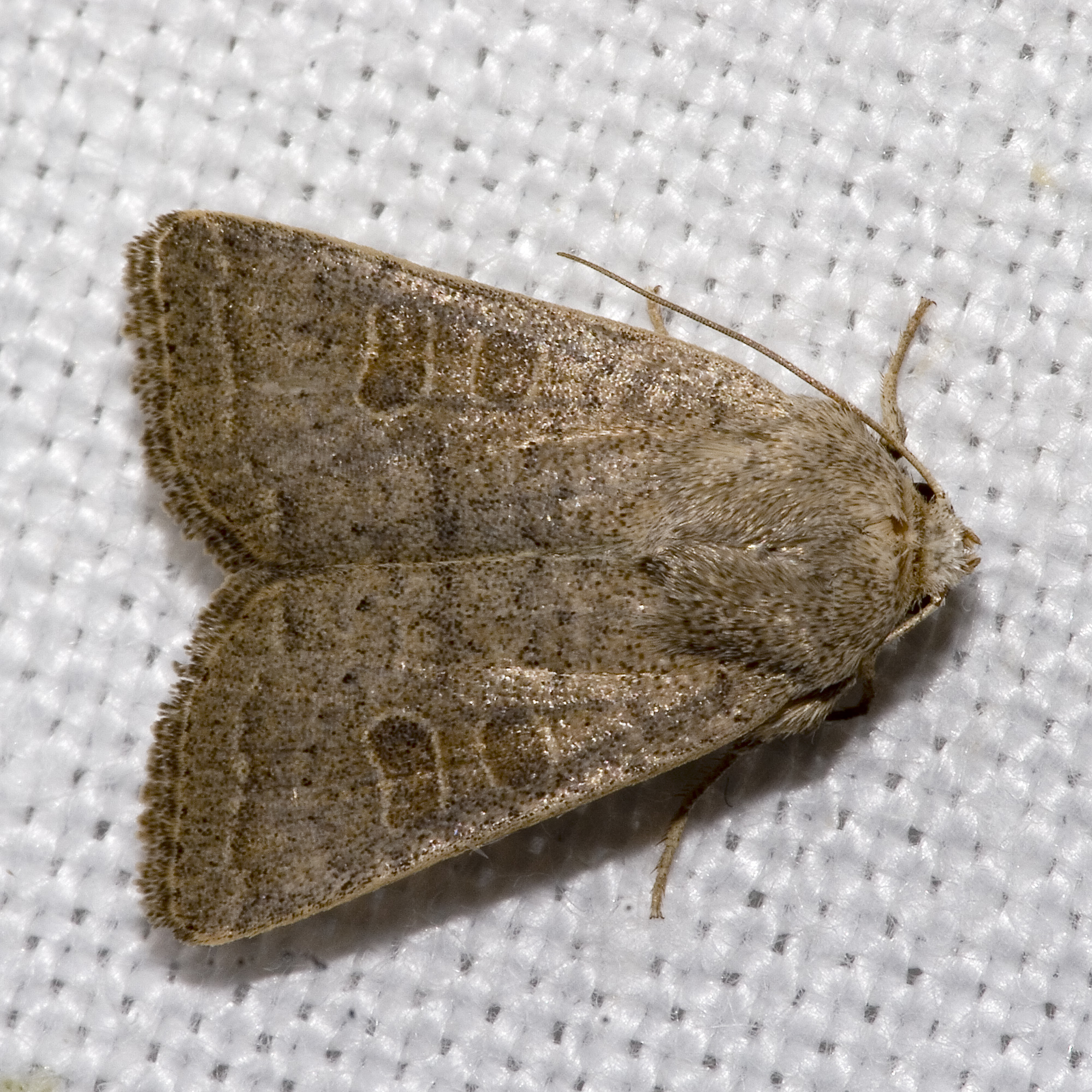
- Hoplodrina ambigua

Scientific classification
- Domain: Eukaryota
- Kingdom: Animalia
- Phylum: Arthropoda
- Class: Insecta
- Order: Lepidoptera
- Superfamily: Noctuoidea
- Family: Noctuidae
- Tribe: Caradrinini
- Genus: Hoplodrina; Boursin, 1937

= Hoplodrina =

Genus of moths

Hoplodrina is a genus of moths of the family Noctuidae.

== Species ==
- Hoplodrina acutivalva Kononenko, 1997
- Hoplodrina ambigua (Denis & Schiffermüller, 1775)
- Hoplodrina atlantis (Zerny, 1934)
- Hoplodrina blanda (Denis & Schiffermüller, 1775)
- Hoplodrina conspicua (Leech, 1900)
- Hoplodrina distincta Kononenko, 1997
- Hoplodrina euryptera Boursin, 1937
- Hoplodrina hesperica Dufay & Boursin, 1960
- Hoplodrina implacata (Wileman & West, 1929)
- Hoplodrina levis (Staudinger, 1888)
- Hoplodrina minimalis Kononenko, 1997
- Hoplodrina octogenaria (Goeze, 1781)
- Hoplodrina pfeifferi (Boursin, 1932)
- Hoplodrina placata (Leech, 1900)
- Hoplodrina respersa (Denis & Schiffermüller, 1775)
- Hoplodrina straminea (Zerny, 1934)
- Hoplodrina superstes (Ochsenheimer, 1816)
