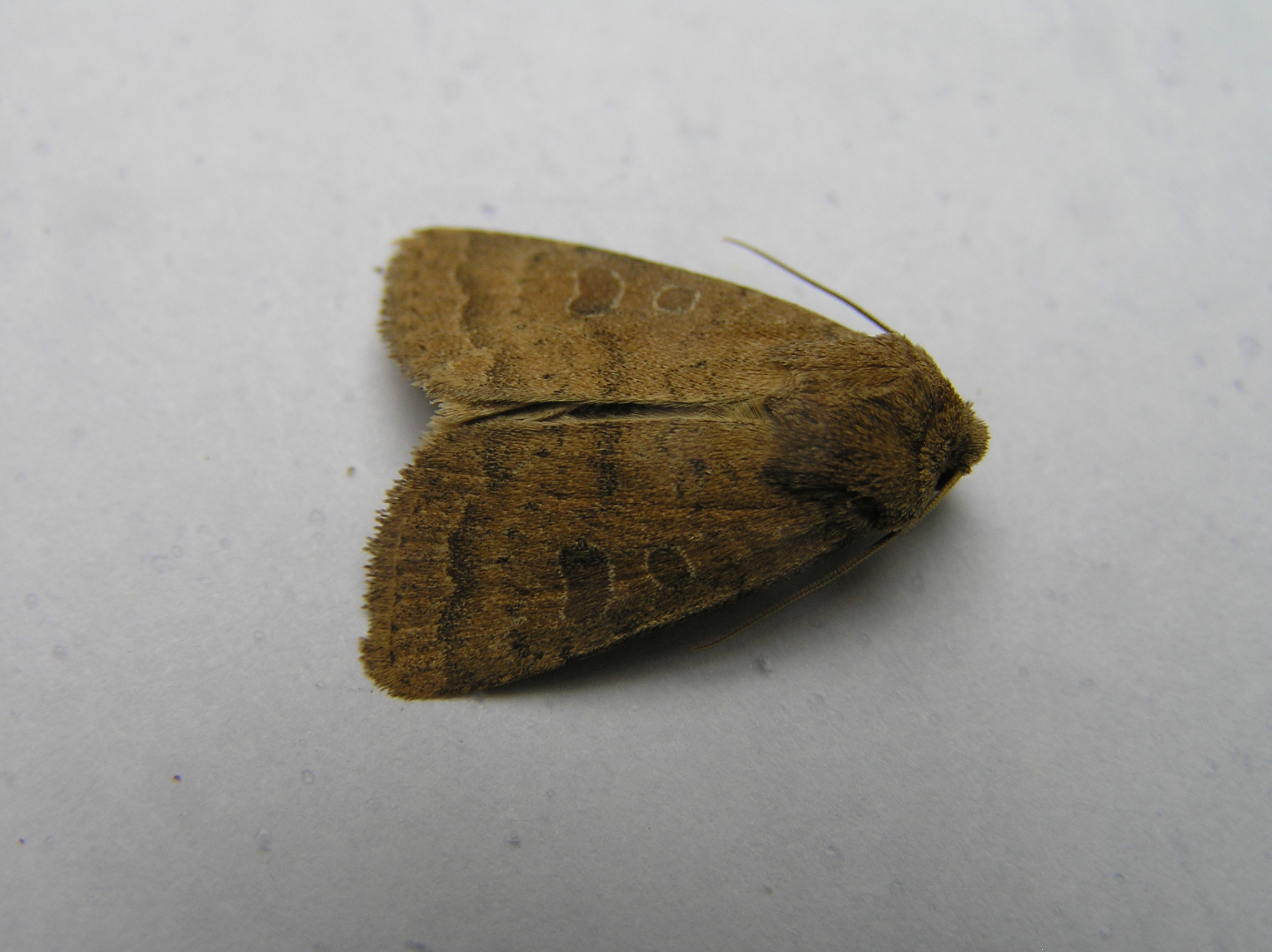

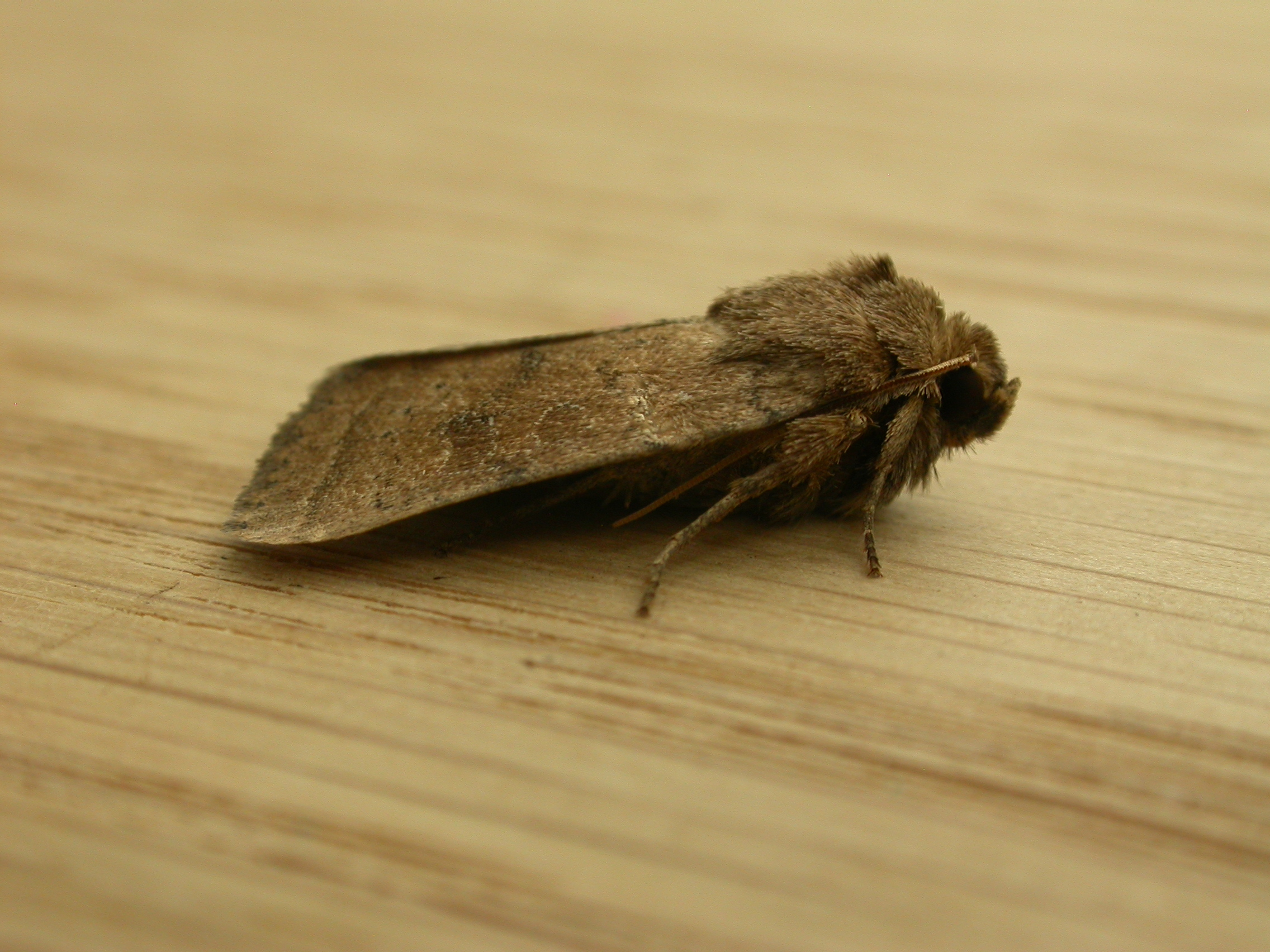

Scientific classification
- Kingdom: Animalia
- Phylum: Arthropoda
- Clade: Pancrustacea
- Class: Insecta
- Order: Lepidoptera
- Superfamily: Noctuoidea
- Family: Noctuidae
- Genus: Hoplodrina
- Species: H. octogenaria

Binomial name
- Hoplodrina octogenaria (Goeze, 1781)

Synonyms
- Hoplodrina alsines

= Hoplodrina octogenaria =

Species of moth

Hoplodrina octogenaria, the uncertain, is a moth of the family Noctuidae. It is found in the Palearctic realm (Europe, Russia, Turkey, Transcaucasia, Siberia, Uzbekistan, Kyrgyzstan, Altai, north Mongolia, North Korea, and north China).

== Description ==
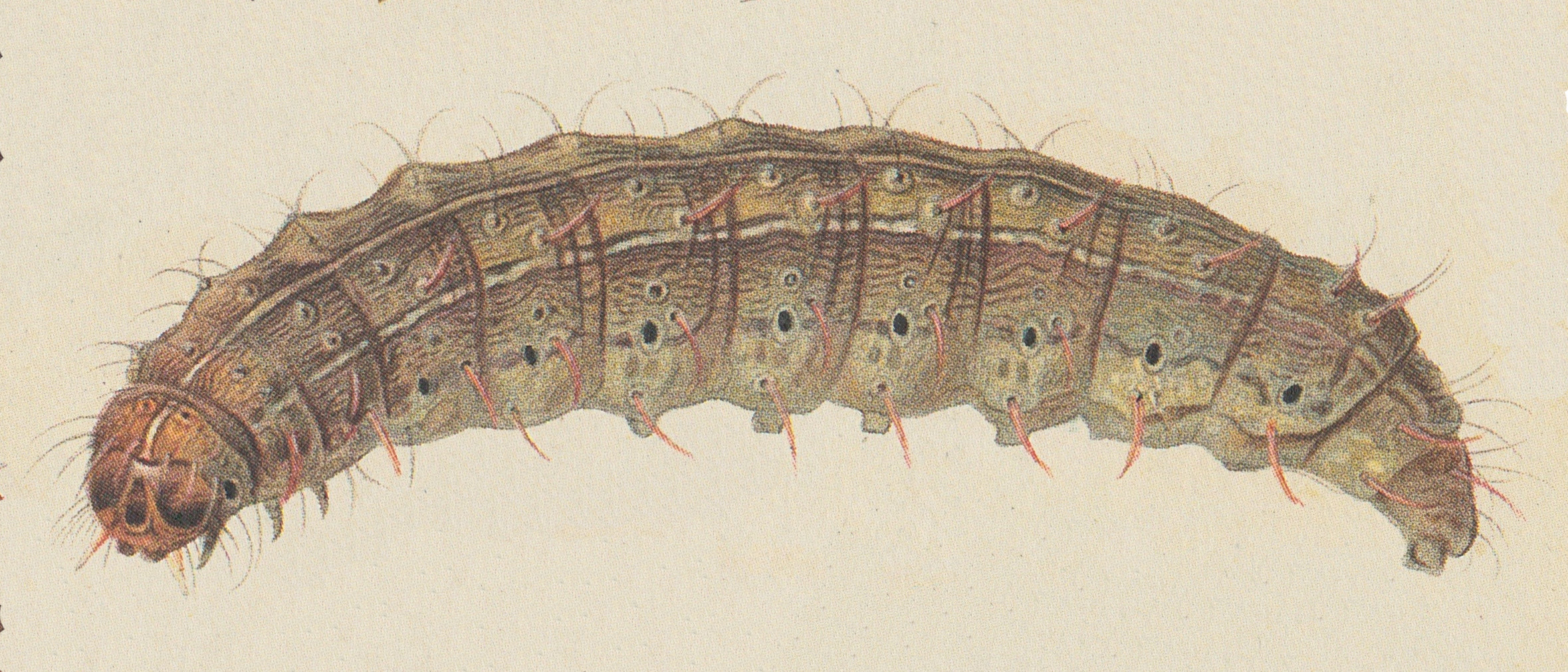
Caterpillar

The wingspan is 28–34 mm. The ground colour is rich brown or tawny brown; darker in the female. The reniform and orbicular spots are darker than the ground colour and outlined in white. The darker-than-the-ground-colour median line is usually wide. The name uncertain refers to its being similar to and confused with Hoplodrina blanda and Hoplodrina ambigua. Certain identification requires dissection of the genitalia.

== Biology ==
The length of the forewings is 14–16 mm. In Belgium and the Netherlands, the moth flies in one generation from late May to August. (Note: This may vary in other parts of the range.)

The larvae feed on Lamium, Primula, Stellaria and Rumex species.
