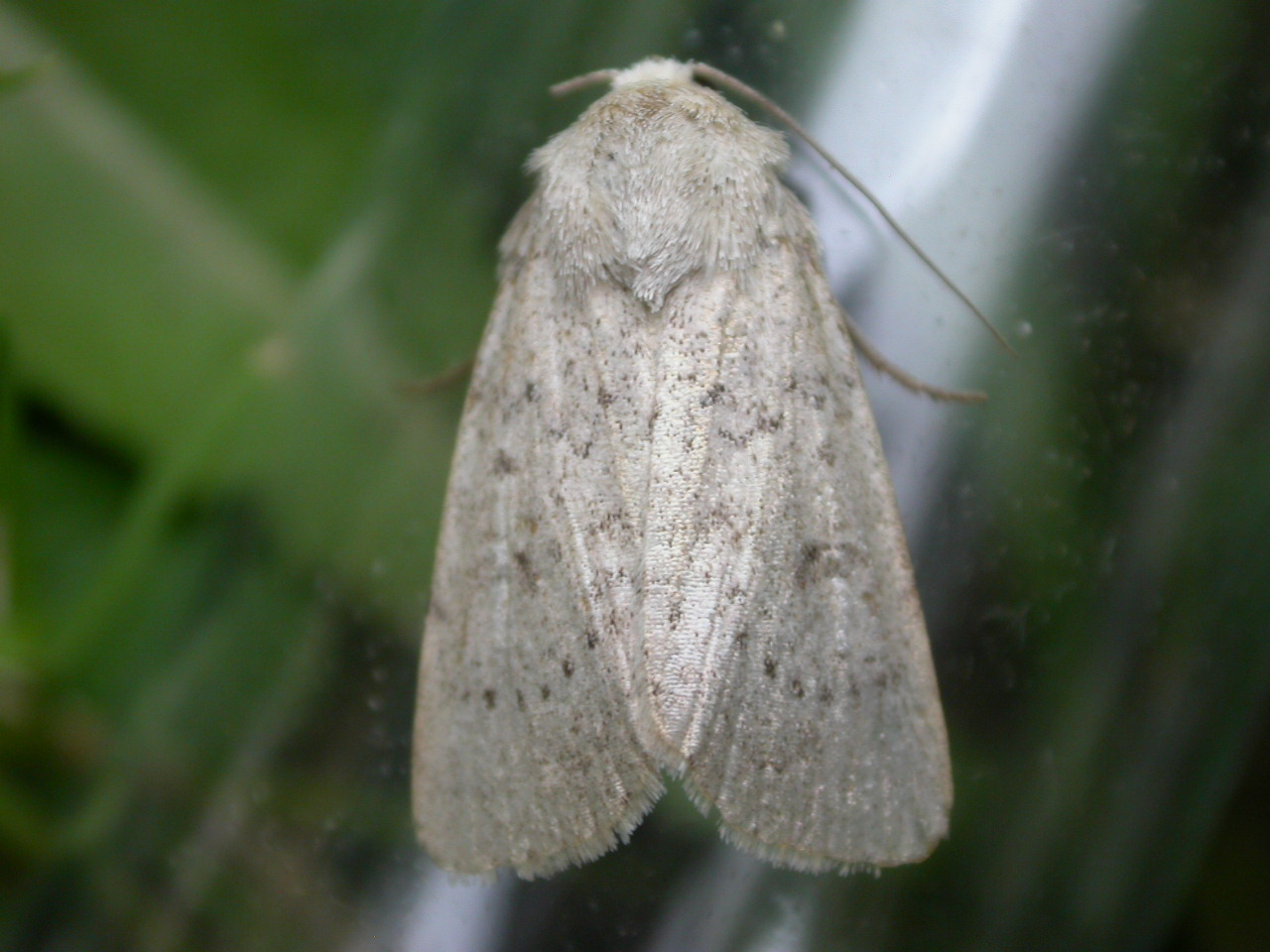

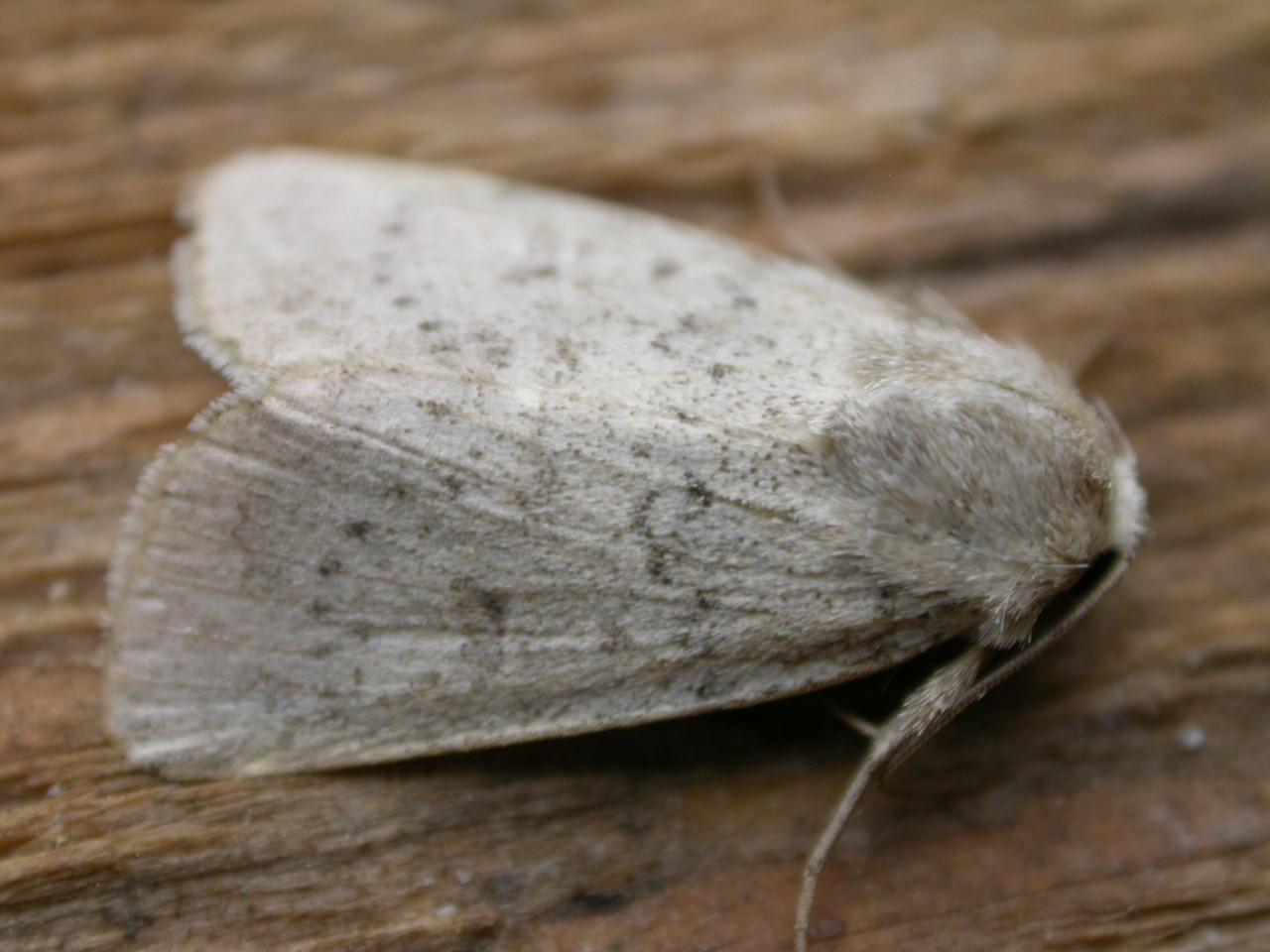

Scientific classification
- Domain: Eukaryota
- Kingdom: Animalia
- Phylum: Arthropoda
- Class: Insecta
- Order: Lepidoptera
- Superfamily: Noctuoidea
- Family: Noctuidae
- Genus: Hoplodrina
- Species: H. respersa

Binomial name
- Hoplodrina respersa (Denis & Schiffermüller, 1775)

Synonyms
- Noctua respersa Denis & Schiffermuller, 1775; Hoplodrina respersa albirespersa Helbig, 1940; Hoplodrina respersa poncebosi Agenjo, 1945

= Hoplodrina respersa =

Sprinkled rustic

Species of moth

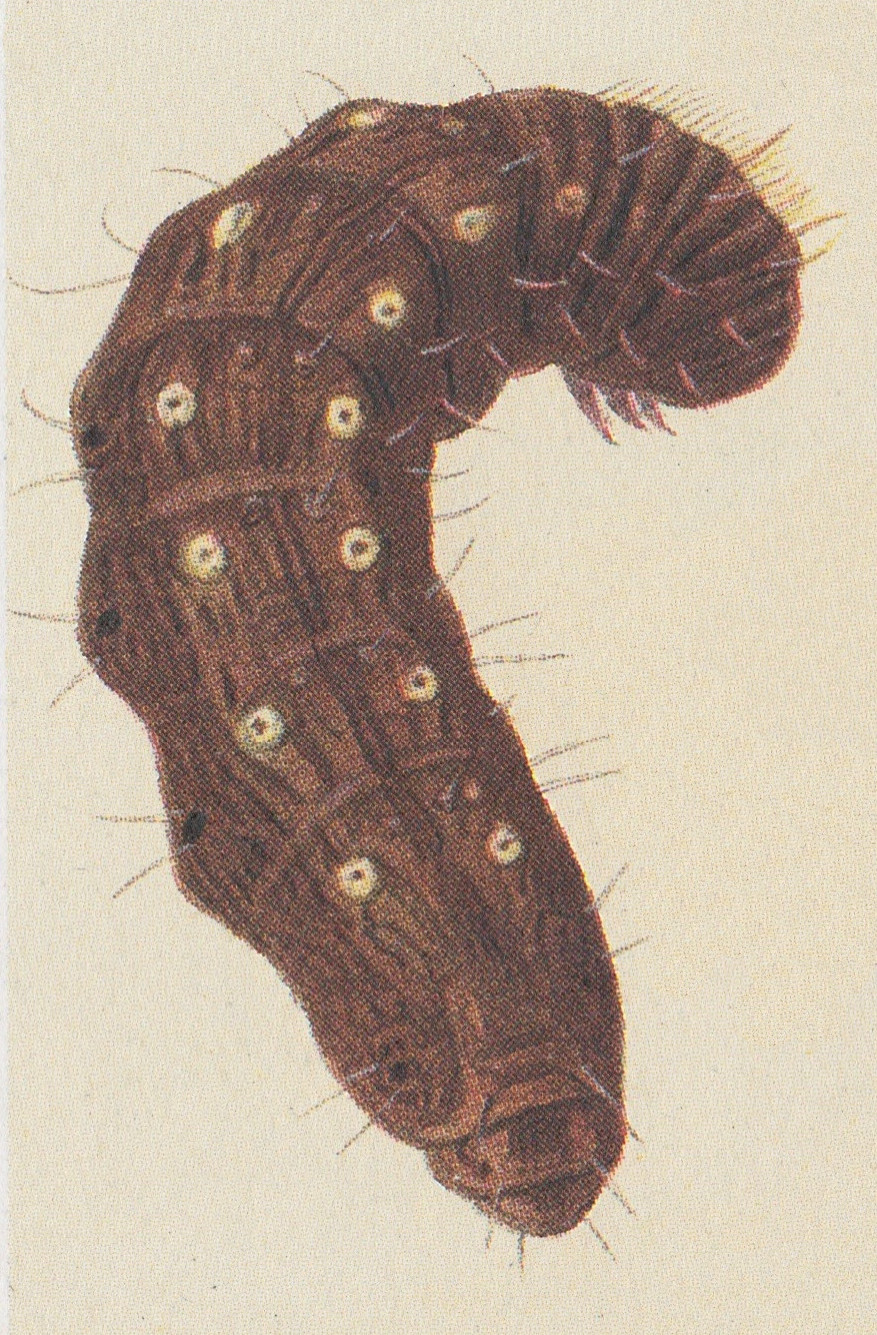
Caterpillar

Hoplodrina respersa, the sprinkled rustic, is a moth of the family Noctuidae. It is known from southern and central Europe, the southern part of European Russia, Asia Minor, Turkey and Transcaucasus.

Adults are on wing from May to August.

The larvae feed on various herbaceous plants.
