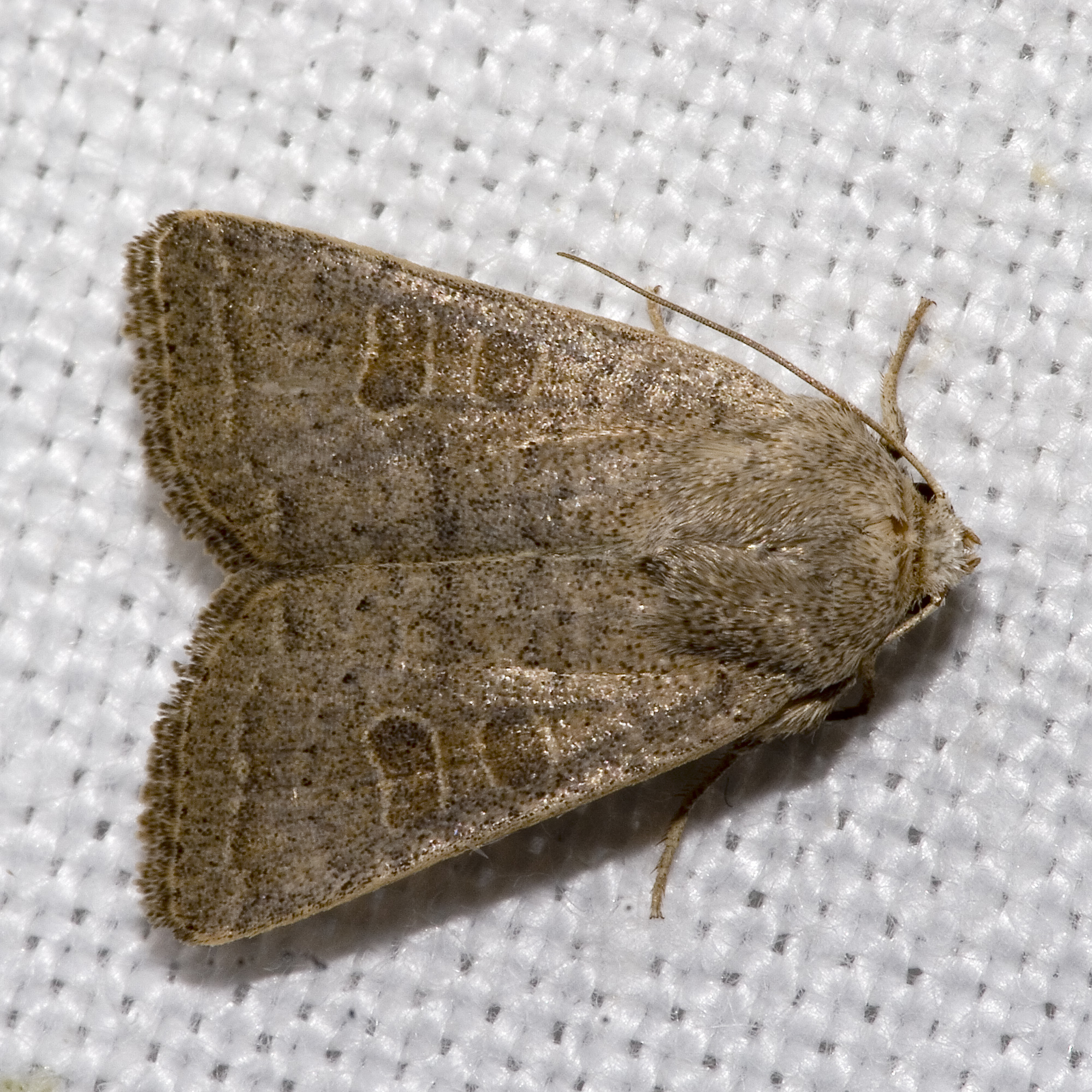

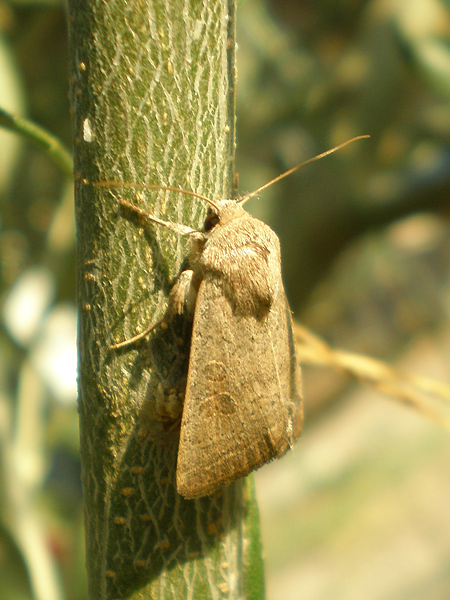

Scientific classification
- Domain: Eukaryota
- Kingdom: Animalia
- Phylum: Arthropoda
- Class: Insecta
- Order: Lepidoptera
- Superfamily: Noctuoidea
- Family: Noctuidae
- Genus: Hoplodrina
- Species: H. ambigua

Binomial name
- Hoplodrina ambigua (Denis & Schiffermüller, 1775)

= Hoplodrina ambigua =

Vine's rustic

Species of moth

Hoplodrina ambigua, the Vine's rustic, is a moth of the family Noctuidae. It is found in the western Palearctic realm (central Europe, south Europe North Africa, Russia to Urals, south-west Siberia, Tuva, Altai Mountains, Tajikistan, Turkestan and in the Near East – Iraq, Iran, Afghanistan, and Pakistan).

== Technical description and variation ==
The wingspan is 32–34 mm. The length of the forewings is 13–15 mm. Forewing greyish ochreous, sometimes uniformly washed with brownish; the lines and stigmata dark grey, the latter with pale annuli; submarginal line luteous preceded by a dark grey shade; hindwing dirty pale grey in male, darker in female, and darker in both sexes in the brown suffused forms: - the form sericea Speyer, from Holland and Germany, is described as having narrower silky grey forewings; -in [now full species levis Stgr.], from W. Turkestan and Asia Minor, the yellower ochreous tint is predominant and the dark markings are conspicuous but in some pale examples from Segovia, Spain- ab. ochrea ab. nov. [Warren] the dark markings tend to become effaced, the head, thorax, and forewings being pale yellow ochreous - amurensis Stgr. indicates small dark examples from Ussuri, Amurland. Similar to and confused with Hoplodrina octogenaria and Hoplodrina blanda. Certain identification requires dissection of the genitalia.See Townsend et al.

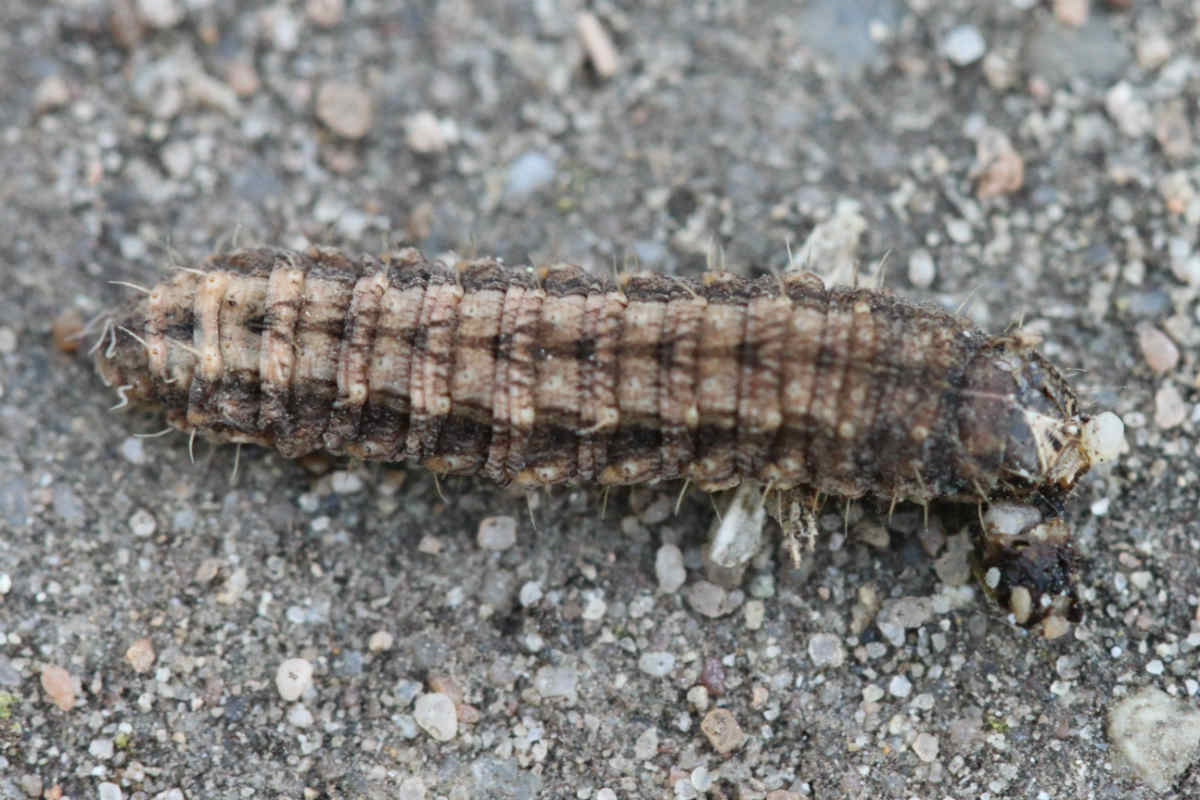
Larva

== Biology ==
The moth flies in two generations from early May to mid-October..

Larva clay coloured, darker dorsally: the dorsal line itself fine and white with dark edges; the subdorsal also fine and pale; laterally a pale dark edged serrate line containing the spiracles. The larvae are polyphagous feeding on various herbaceous plants including Beta vulgaris, Cynara scolymus, Medicago sativa and Taraxacum officinale.

== Notes ==
1. The flight season refers to Belgium and The Netherlands. This may vary in other parts of the range.
