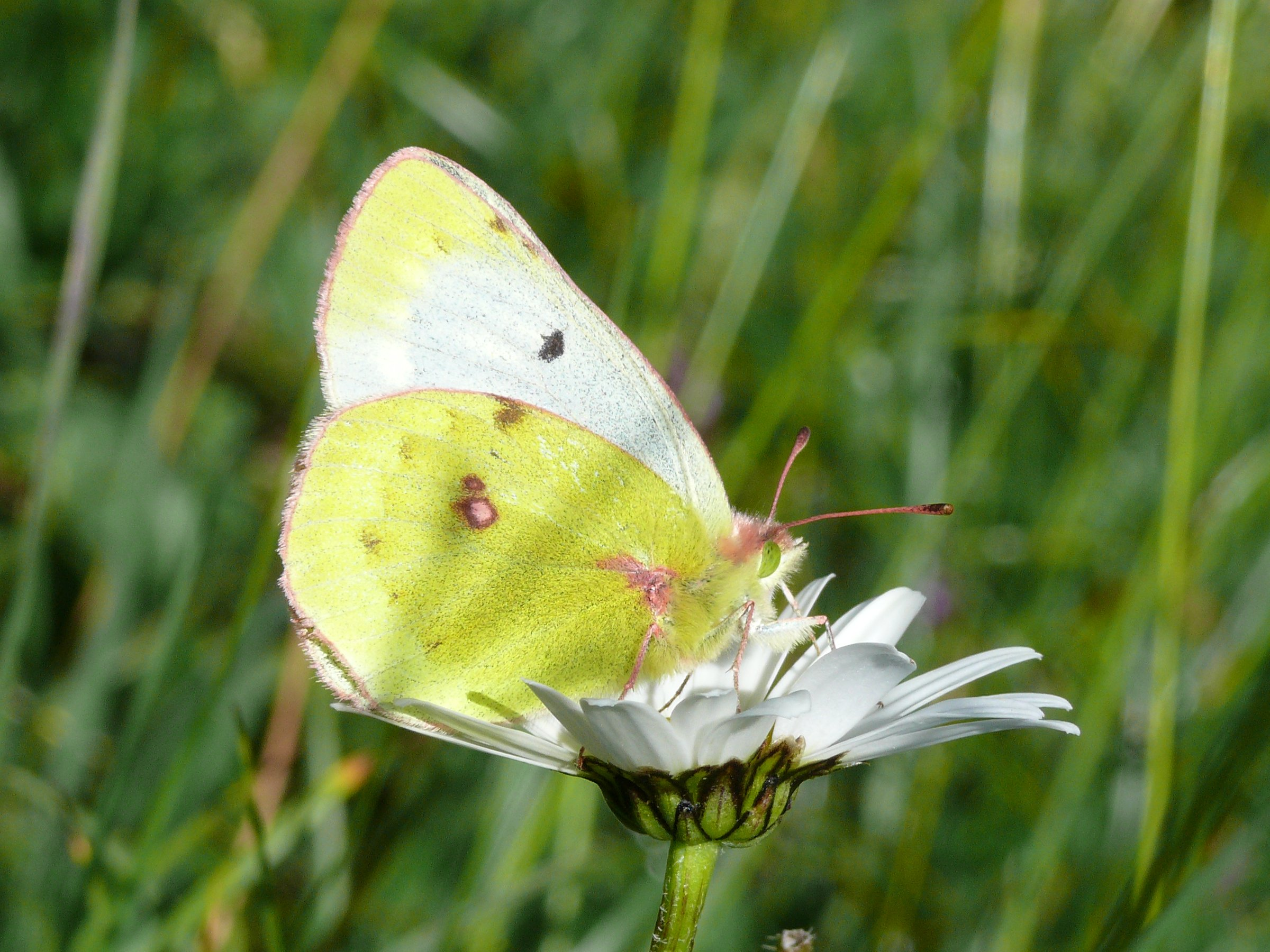

Conservation status
- Least Concern (IUCN 3.1)

Scientific classification
- Kingdom: Animalia
- Phylum: Arthropoda
- Clade: Pancrustacea
- Class: Insecta
- Order: Lepidoptera
- Family: Pieridae
- Genus: Colias
- Species: C. phicomone

Binomial name
- Colias phicomone (Esper, 1780)

Synonyms
- Papilio phicomone Esper, 1780

= Colias phicomone =

Mountain clouded yellow

Species of butterfly

Colias phicomone, the mountain clouded yellow, is a butterfly in the family Pieridae. It is found in the Cantabrian Mountains, the Pyrenees, the Carpathian Mountains and the Alps. It flies at altitudes of 900 to 2800 meters.

== Description ==
The wingspan is 40–50 mm. The males have yellow wing tops with heavy dark scales, resulting in a dark greenish overall colouration. More or less developed, partially absent yellow submarginal spots are located on the dark edge of the wings. There is a black spot in the center of the forewing and a yellowish-reddish center spot on the hindwing. The edge of the front and outer edges of the forewings and the entire edge of the hindwing is rose-red, as are the head and antennae. The underside of the forewings is white, at the apexmore or less yellow. The underside of the hindwings is yellow and has dark scales on the inner part. The central spot, which is often double, is mother-of-pearl with a red border, which sometimes extends outwards in the form of a line. The female is impure white above, with fewer but more sharply localized dark markings, paler below. The butterfly flies from June to August depending on the location.

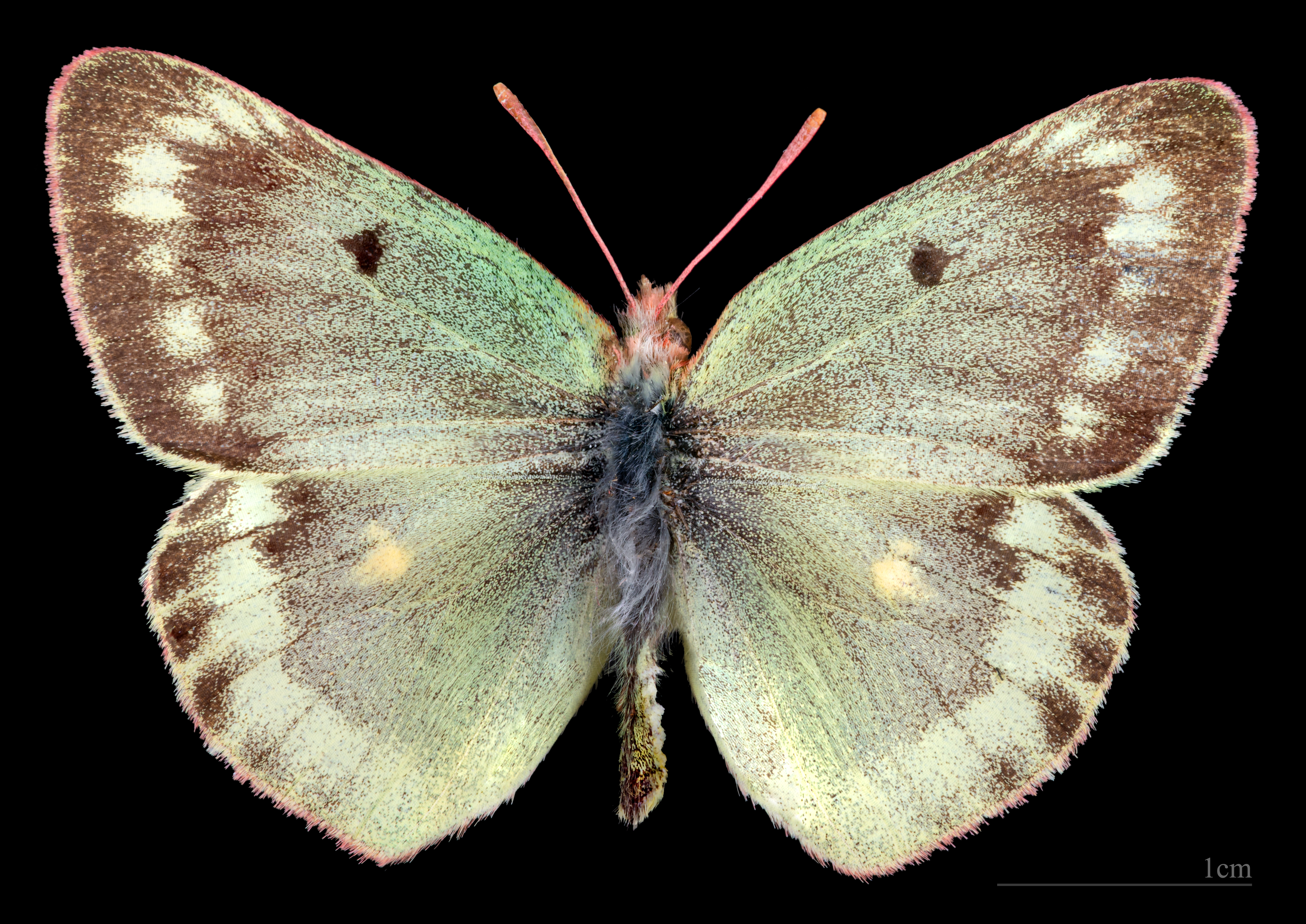
Colias phicomone ♂

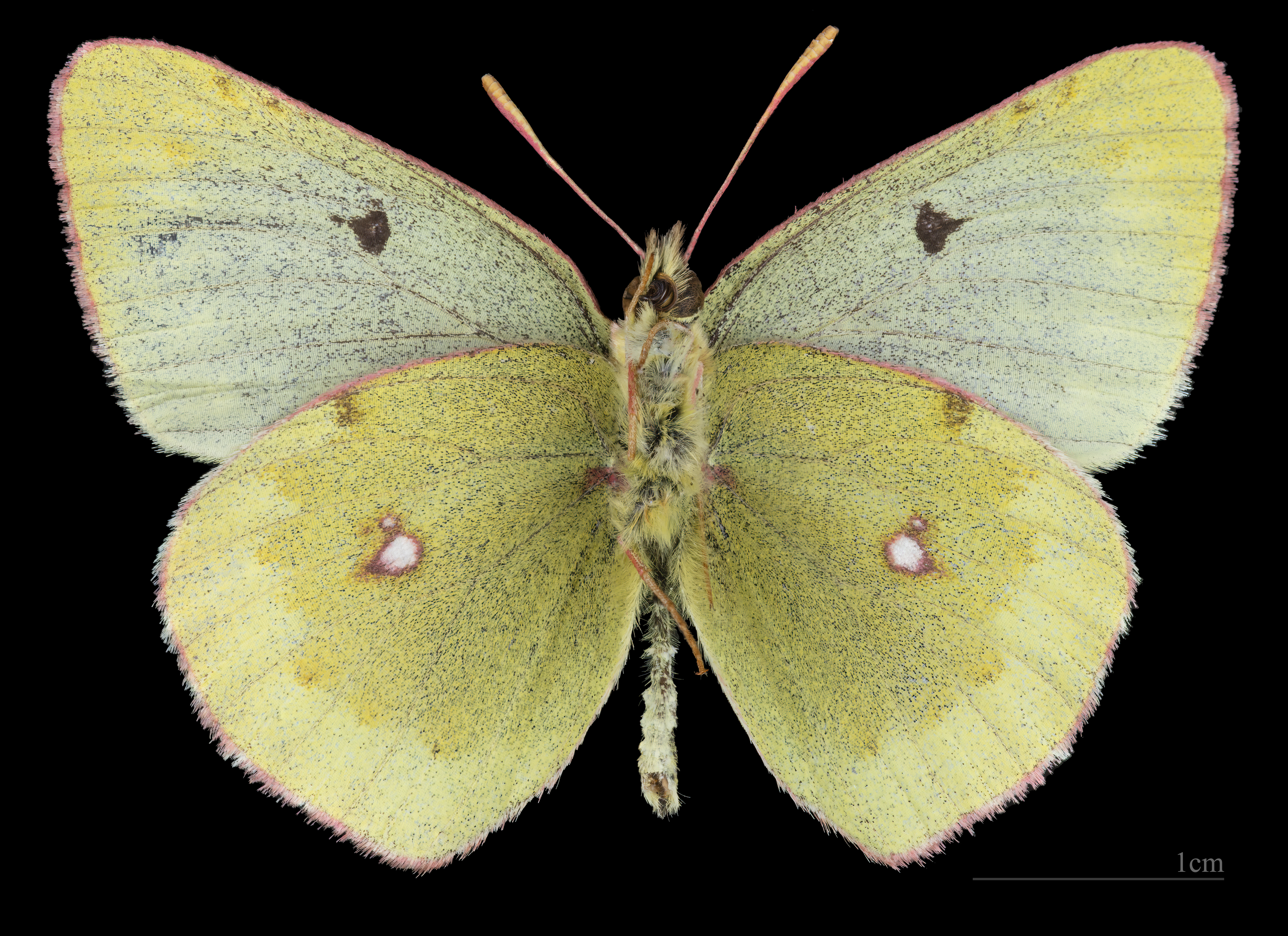
Colias phicomone ♂ △

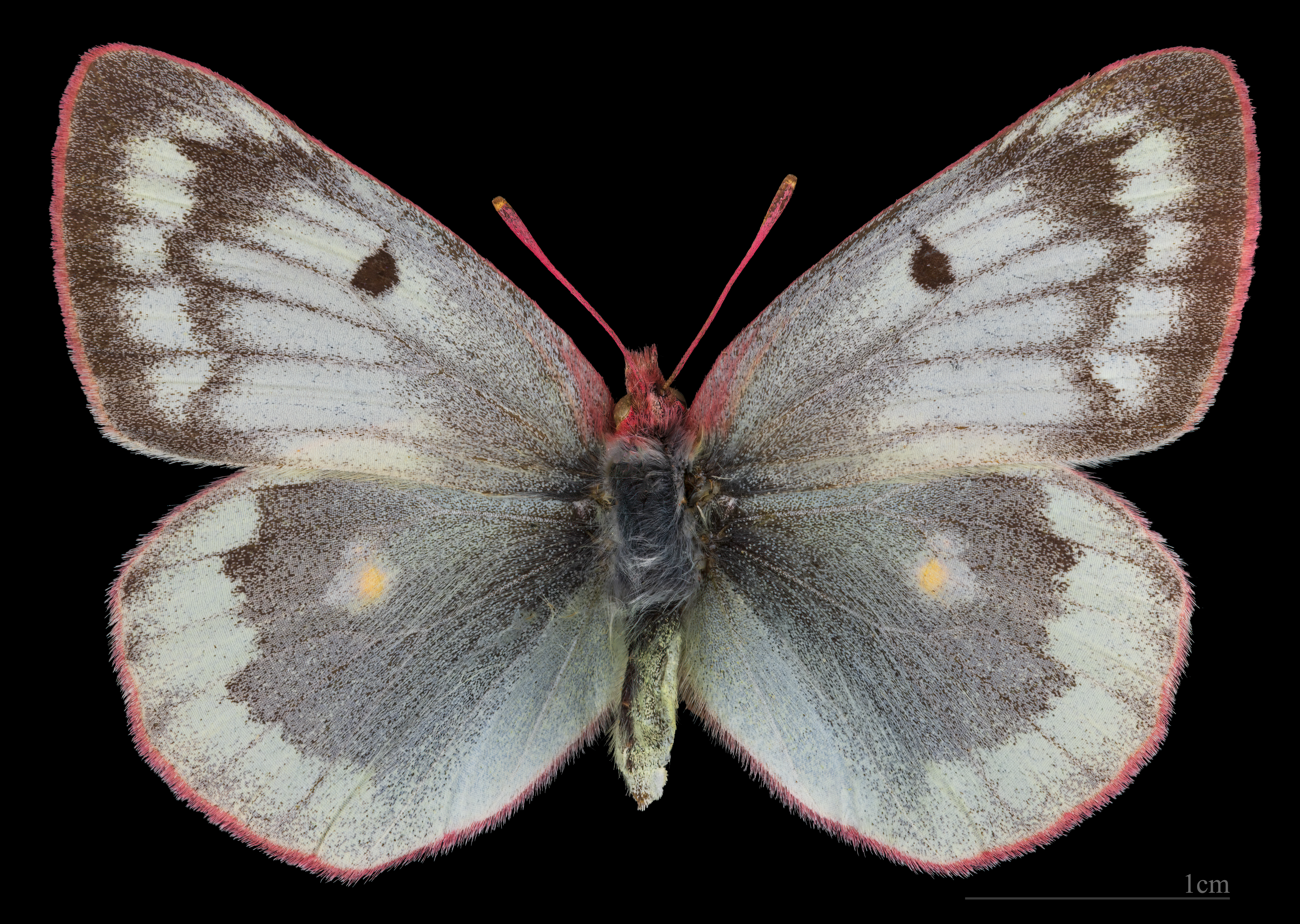
Colias phicomone ♀

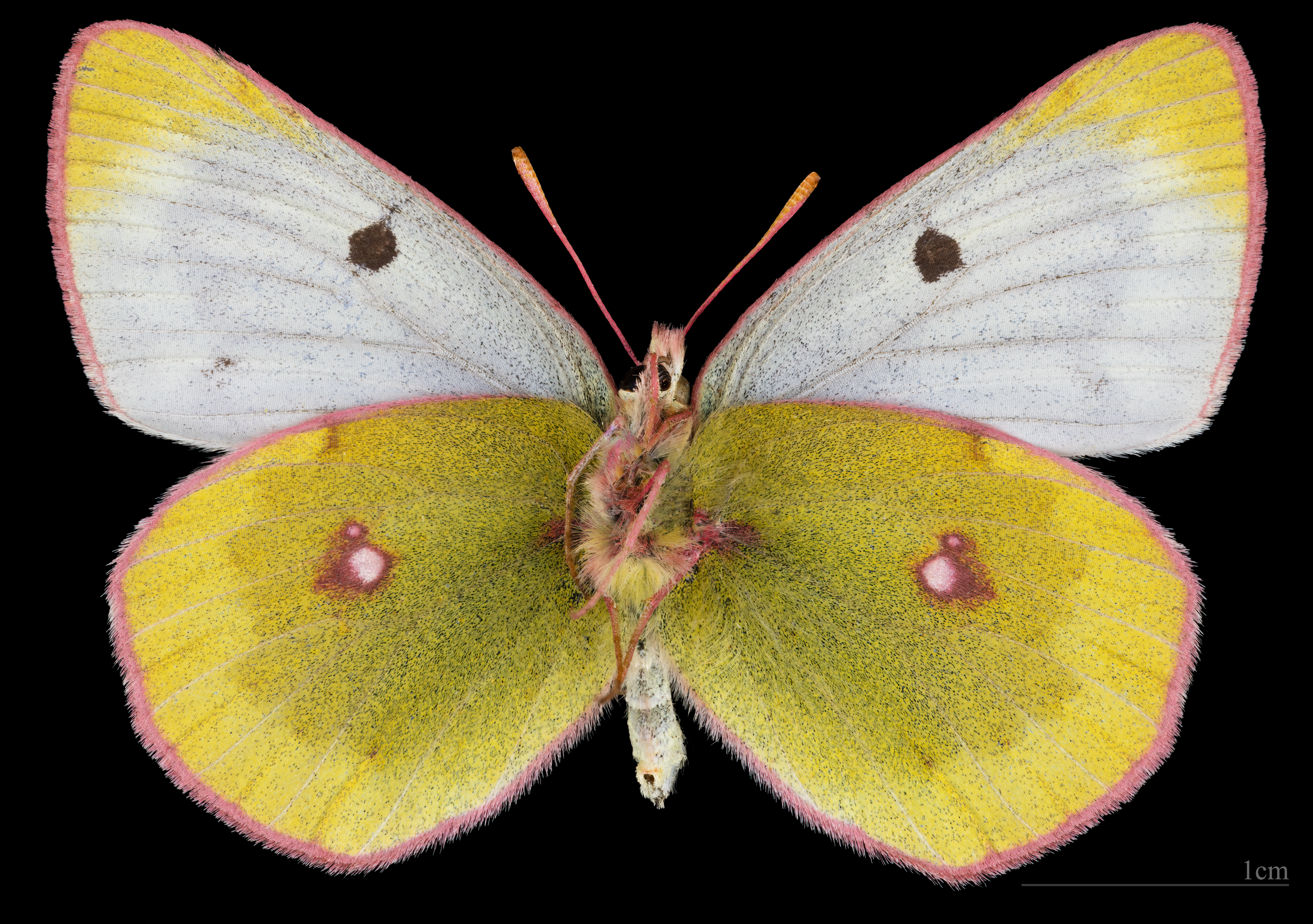
Colias phicomone ♂ △

== Biology ==
The larvae feed on Fabaceae species.

== Subspecies ==
- Colias phicomone phicomone (Alps, northern Carpathians, northern Italy)
- Colias phicomone juliana Hospital, 1948 (Cantabria)
- Colias phicomone oberthueri Verity, [1909] (Pyrenees)
- Colias phicomone phila Fruhstorfer, 1903 (Kashmir)

== Similar species ==
- Colias hyale
- Colias alfacariensis
- Colias crocea
- Colias myrmidone
- Colias palaeno
- Colias chrysotheme
- Colias erate

== Etymology ==
Named in the Classical tradition.In Greek mythology Phicomone, is one of the Danaïdes.
