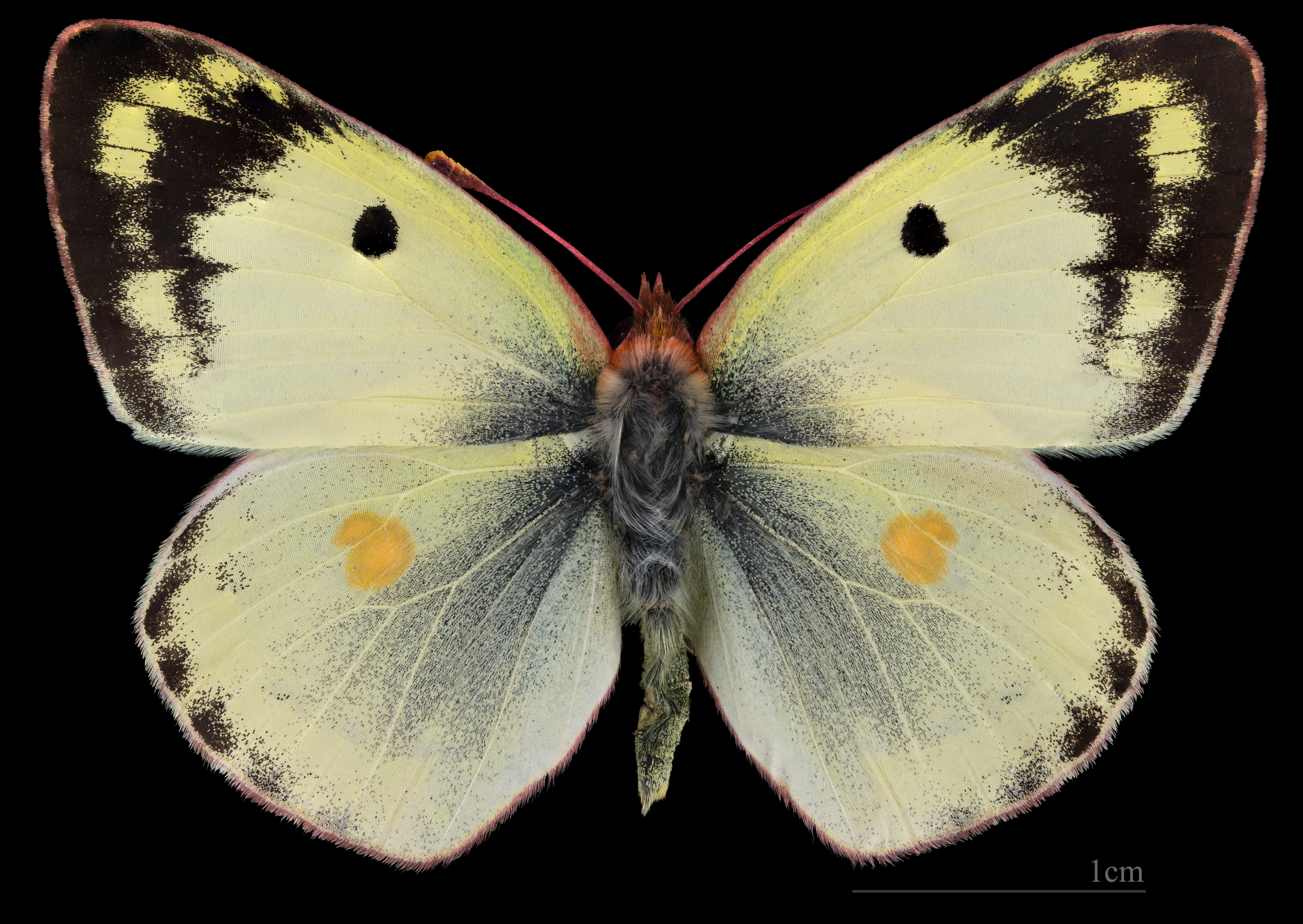
- Colias hyale ♂
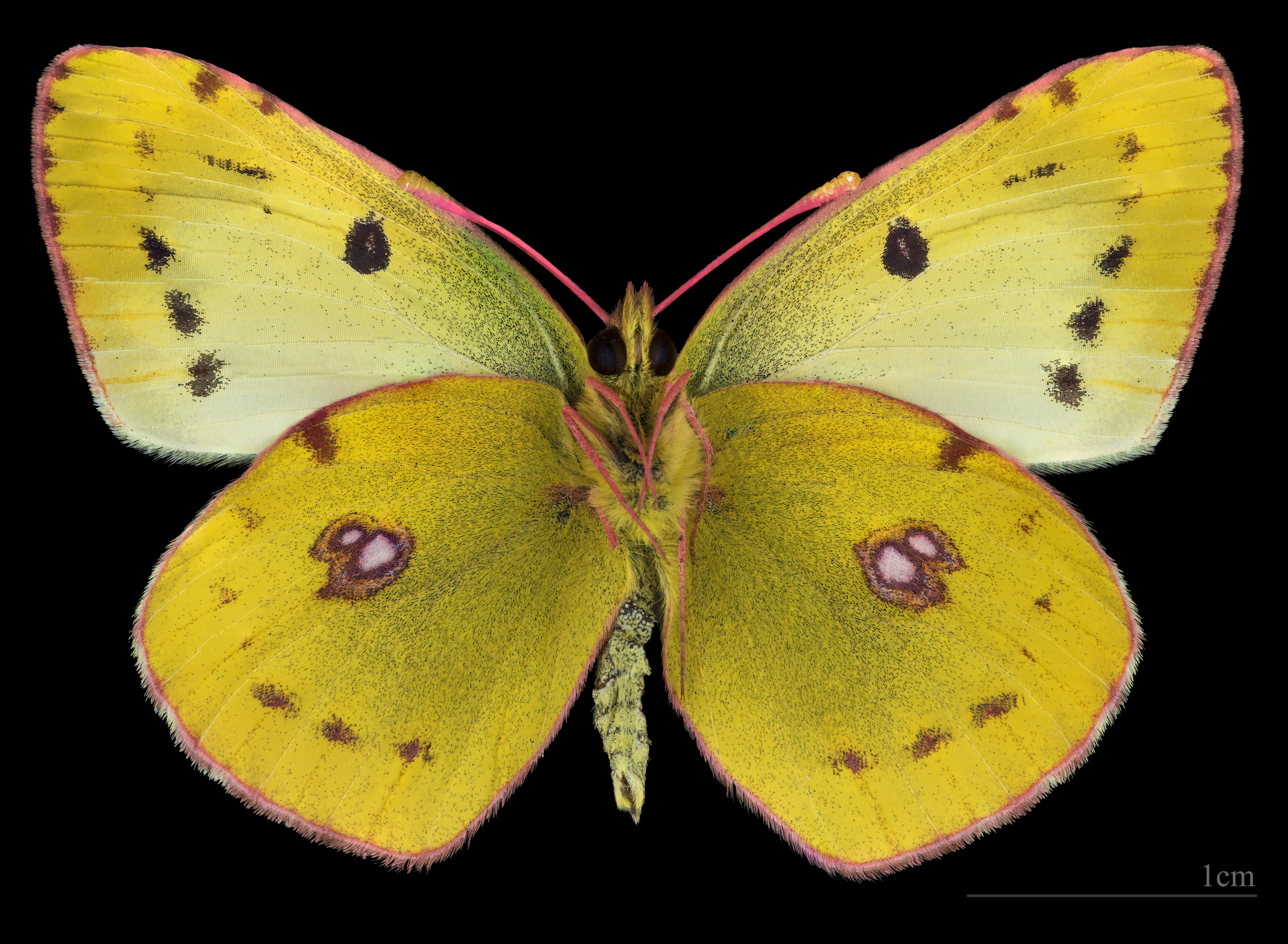
- Colias hyale ♂△

Scientific classification
- Kingdom: Animalia
- Phylum: Arthropoda
- Clade: Pancrustacea
- Class: Insecta
- Order: Lepidoptera
- Family: Pieridae
- Genus: Colias
- Species: C. hyale

Binomial name
- Colias hyale (Linnaeus, 1758)

Synonyms
- Papilio hyale Linnaeus, 1758

= Colias hyale =

Pale clouded yellow

Species of butterfly

Colias hyale, the pale clouded yellow, is a butterfly of the family Pieridae, (also known as the yellows and whites) which is found in most of Europe and large parts of the Palearctic. It is a rare migrant to the British Isles and Scandinavia. The adult wingspan is 52–62 millimetres (2.0–2.4 in).

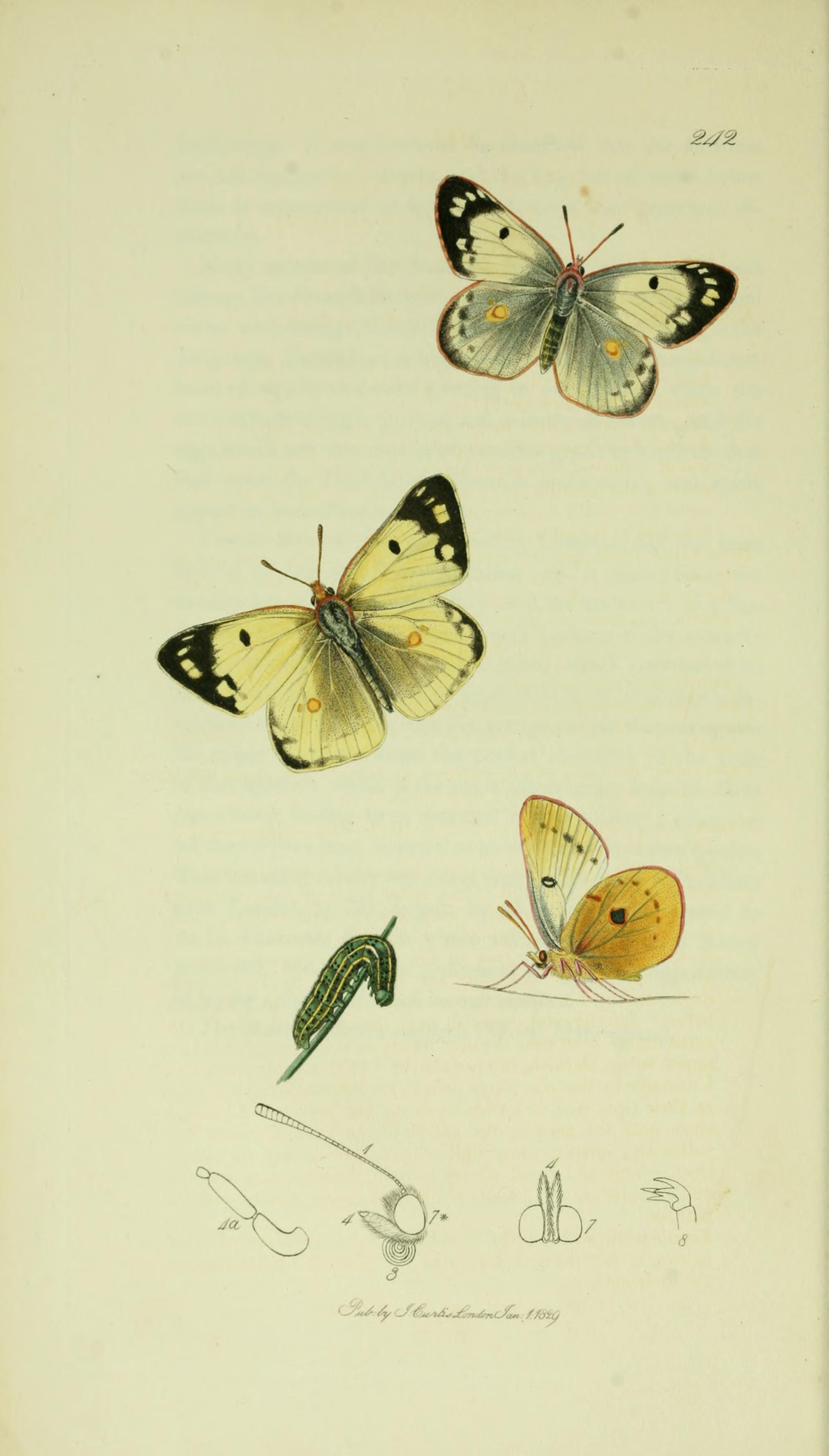
Illustration from John Curtis's British Entomology Volume 5

== Description ==
The upperside of the male is more or less light lemon yellow, with the black marginal and submarginal bands more or less complete on both wings; the black middle spot of the forewing large, in centre of hindwing an orange-yellow double spot; base of wings more or less dusted with black. The underside is bright yellow, being somewhat lighter on the forewing, with small marginal and larger submarginal red-brown spots; the middle spot of the forewing black with pale centre, the hindwing bearing a double spot which is mother-of-pearl colour, encircled by a double ring of red brown; fringes above and beneath, as well as head and antenna red brown. In the female the ground colour of the upperside and the proximal area of the underside of the forewing is white, being slightly yellowish.

The egg is bottle shaped, whitish, with yellowish-brown stripes. The larva is bluish green or grass green, velvety, there being on the back two rows of blackish dots which are traversed by two thin yellow longitudinal lines, above the legs a yellow or reddish longitudinal side line, head dark green; the autumnal larvae without black dorsal spots. Pupa green, with yellow lateral lines.

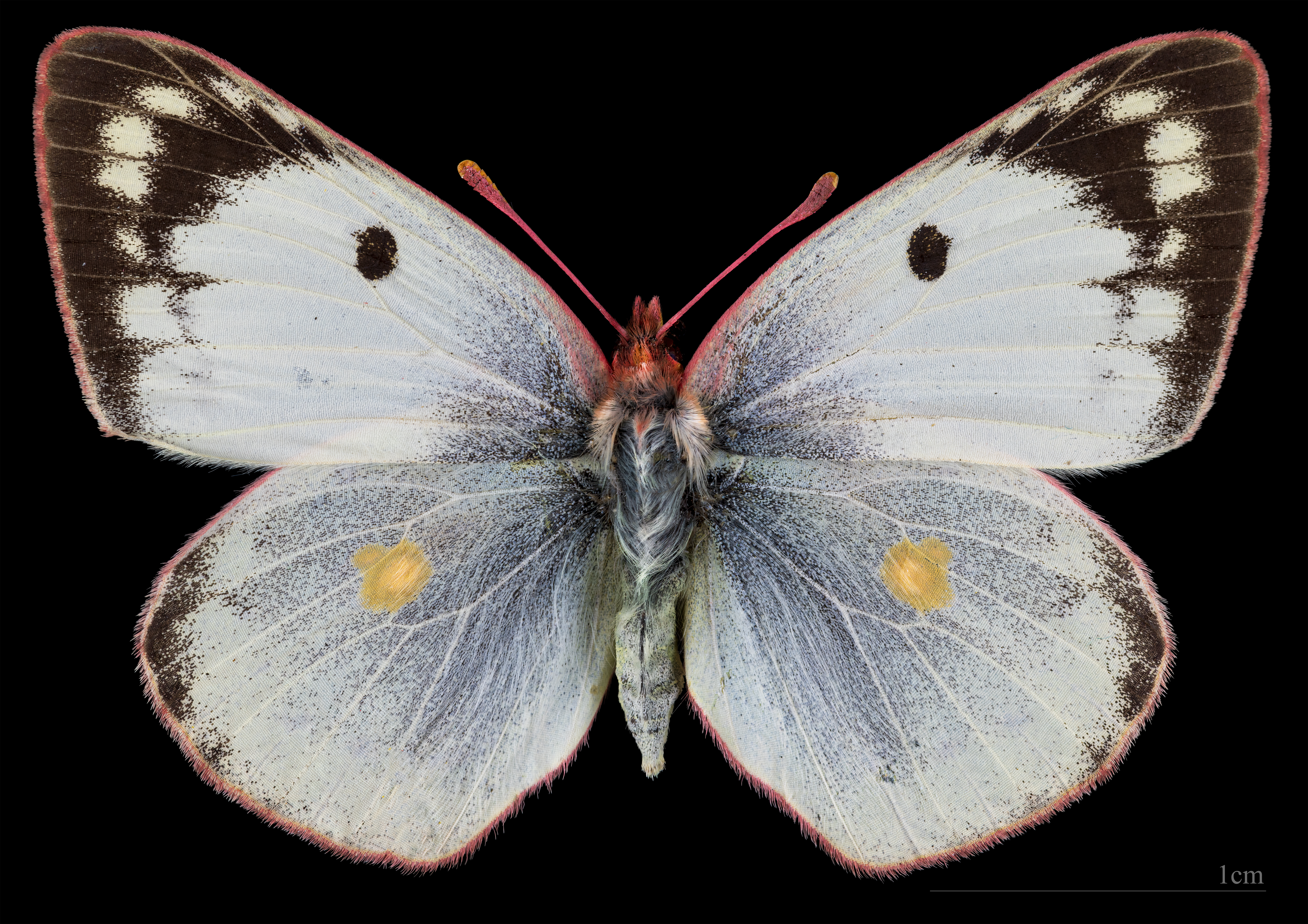
Colias hyale ♀

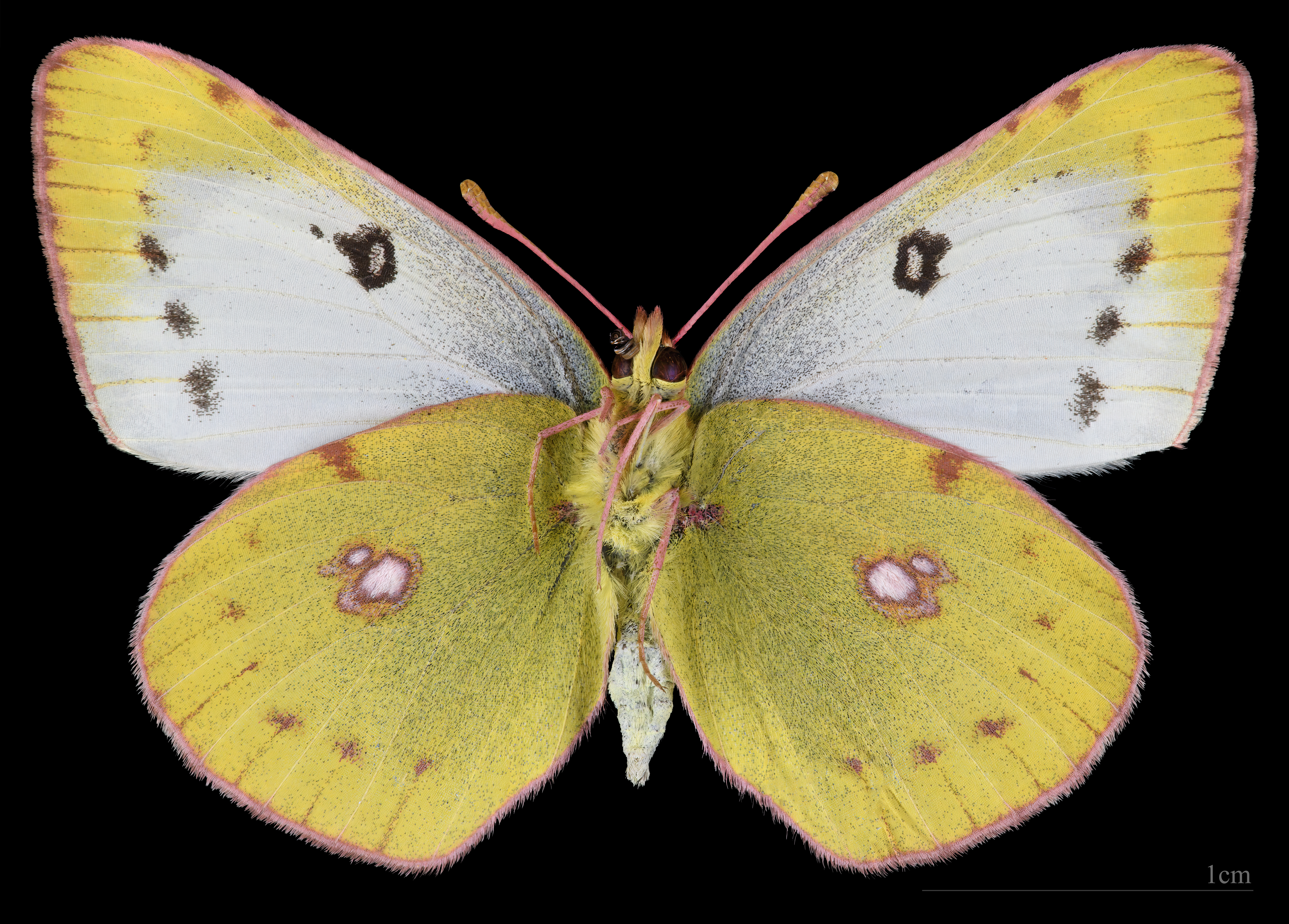
Colias hyale ♀ △

== Biology ==
The larva feeds on several species and genera of Fabaceae, including Vicia, Coronilla, Medicago, Lotus, Cytisus and Trifolium.

== Habitat ==
The species lives in flower meadows up to 2,000 metres above sea level.

== Distribution ==
It is common throughout the Palaearctic Region. Recorded from Ireland only once, in 1868; in England it is found only in the south.

== Subspecies ==
- Colias hyale hyale Europe, Ukraine, S. Russia
- Colias hyale alta Staudinger, 1886 a large form with a broad black marginal band provisionally accepted as a full species that flies only at high altitudes in Kyrgyzstan and Tajikistan "but it may only be a subspecies of C. hyale". by Grieshuber & Lamas, 2007
- Colias hyale altaica Verity, 1911 Altaï
- Colias hyale irkutskana Stauder, 1924
- Colias hyale palidis Fruhstorfer, 1910 East Siberia
- Colias hyale novasinensis Reissinger, 1989 Gansu

== Similar species ==
- Colias myrmidone
- Colias alfacariensis
- Colias crocea
- Colias phicomone
- Colias palaeno
- Colias chrysotheme
- Colias erate
