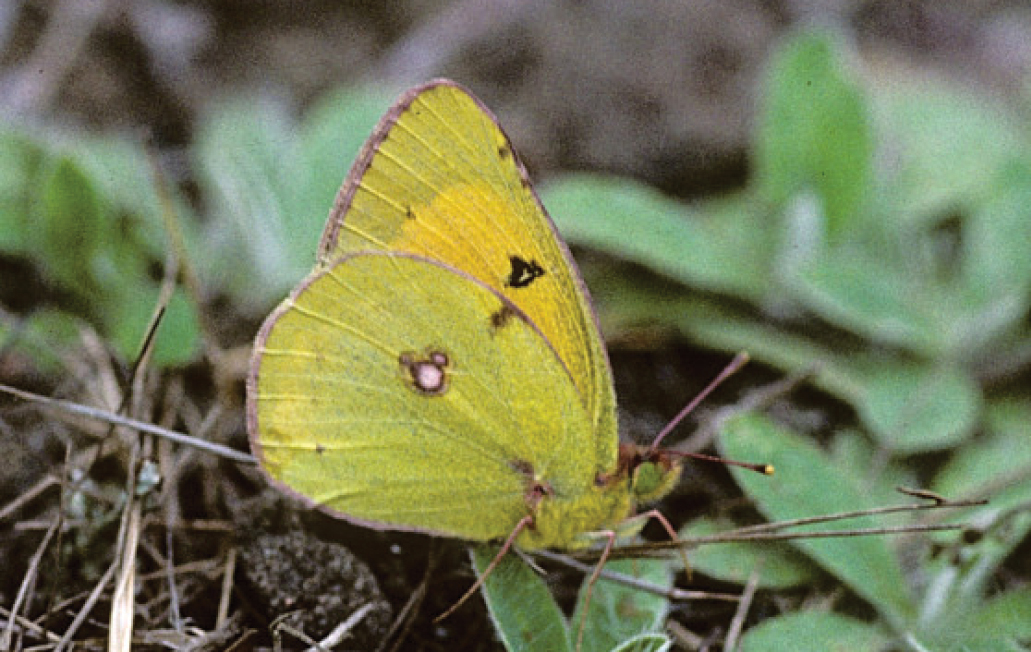

Conservation status
- Vulnerable (IUCN 3.1)

Scientific classification
- Kingdom: Animalia
- Phylum: Arthropoda
- Class: Insecta
- Order: Lepidoptera
- Family: Pieridae
- Genus: Colias
- Species: C. myrmidone

Binomial name
- Colias myrmidone Esper, 1780

= Colias myrmidone =

Danube clouded yellow

Species of butterfly

Colias myrmidone, the Danube clouded yellow, is a butterfly in the family Pieridae.

== Distribution ==
It is found from Western Asia, through Southern Russia, Ukraine, Romania, Hungary up to Austria and the Jura Mountains near Regensburg in Germany.

== Description ==
The wingspan is 44–50 mm (1.7–2.0 in). the butterflies of the second generation are often slightly larger than those of the first generation. The wing uppers of the males are bright orange-yellow in ground colour and have a dark edge that is not dusted. The dark border is narrower on the hind wingsand not broken through by veins (in contrast to Colias crocea ). The wing uppers of the females are orange-yellow to greenish-white ( C. myrmidone f. alba ) in colour and have a dark, dusty border. On the hind wings, the spots of the submarginal region often form a continuous band.In both sexes there is a red spot in the cell on the underside of the hindwing, the underside of the forewing has faint black spots in the postdiscal region

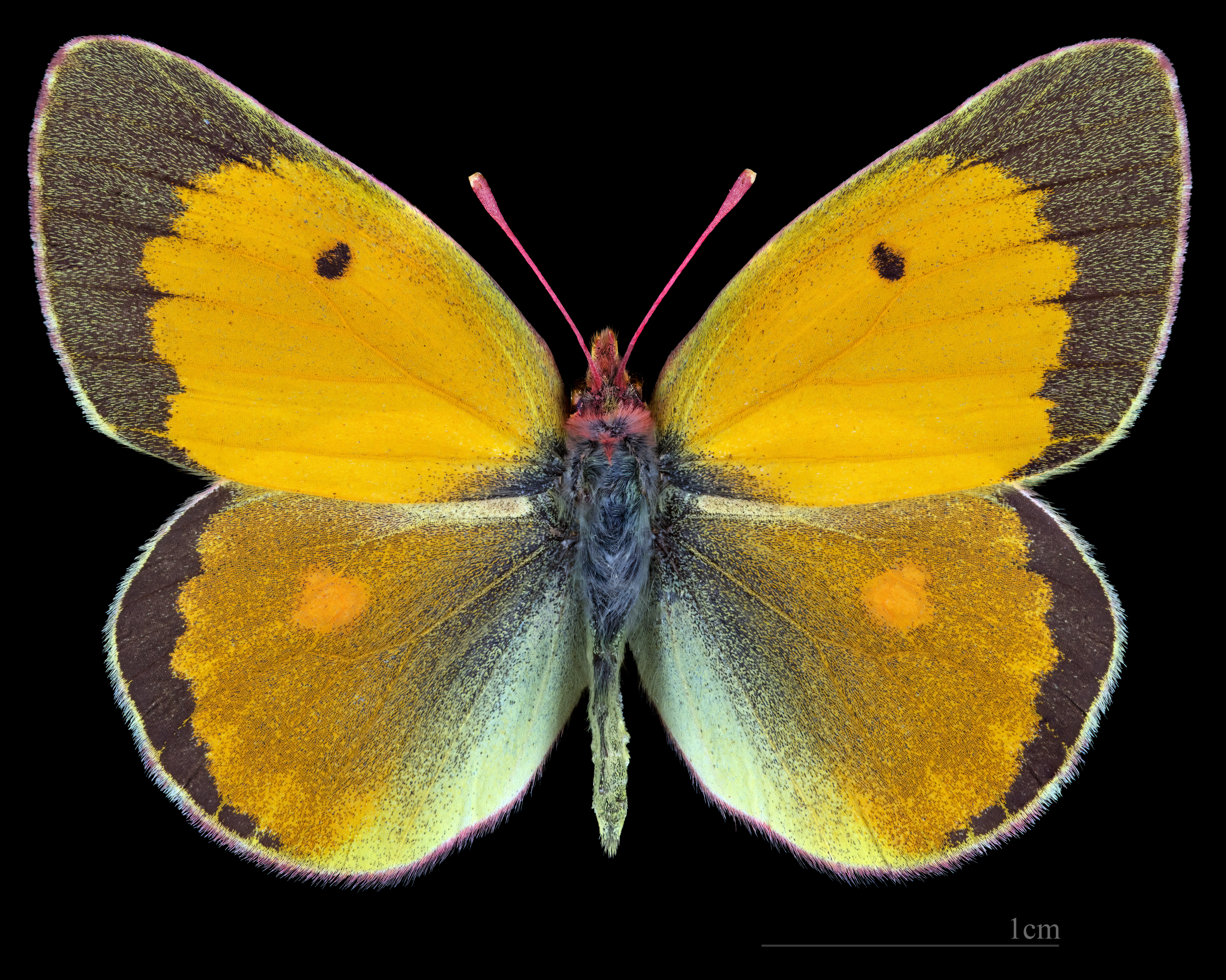
Colias myrmidone ♂

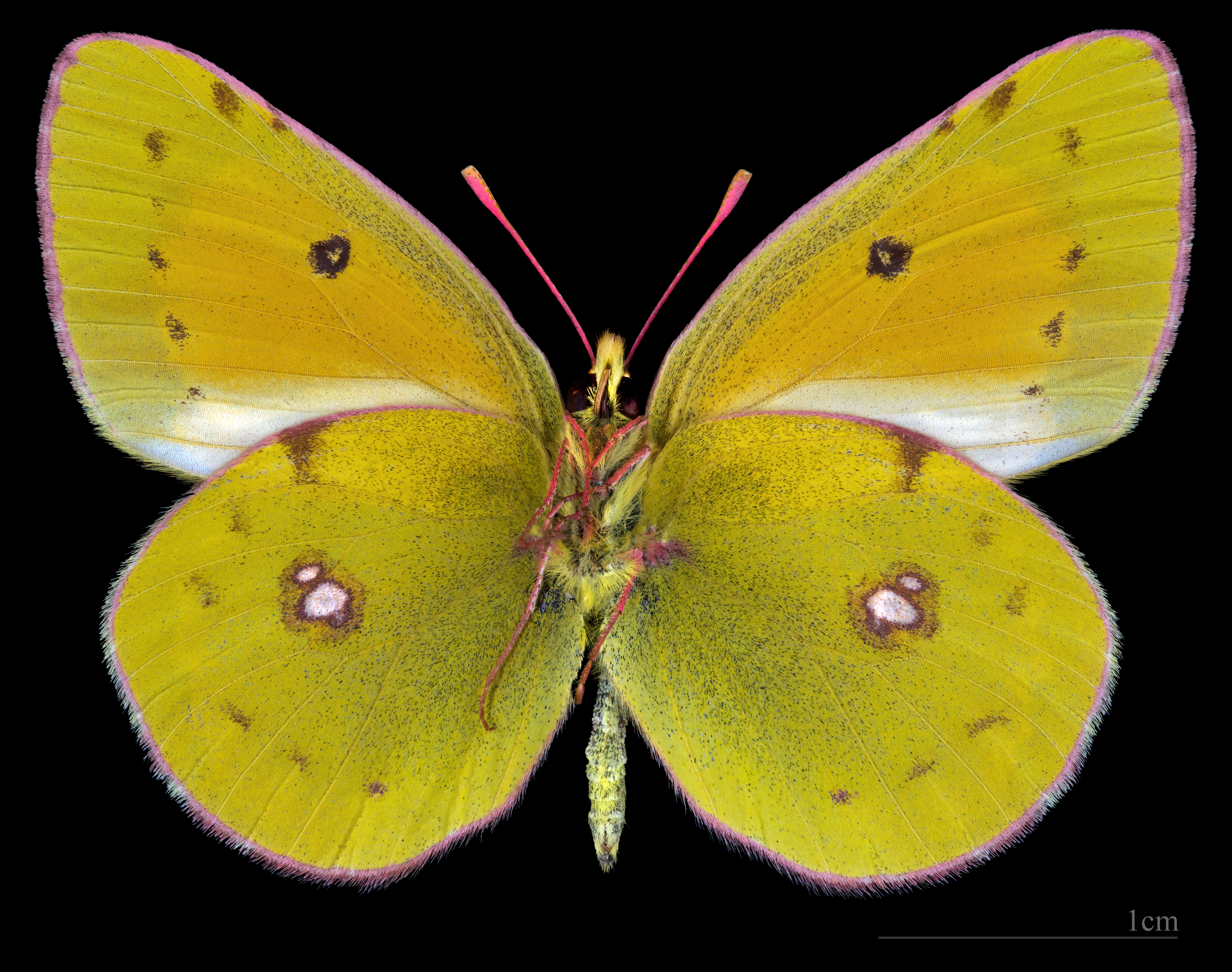
Colias myrmidone ♂ △

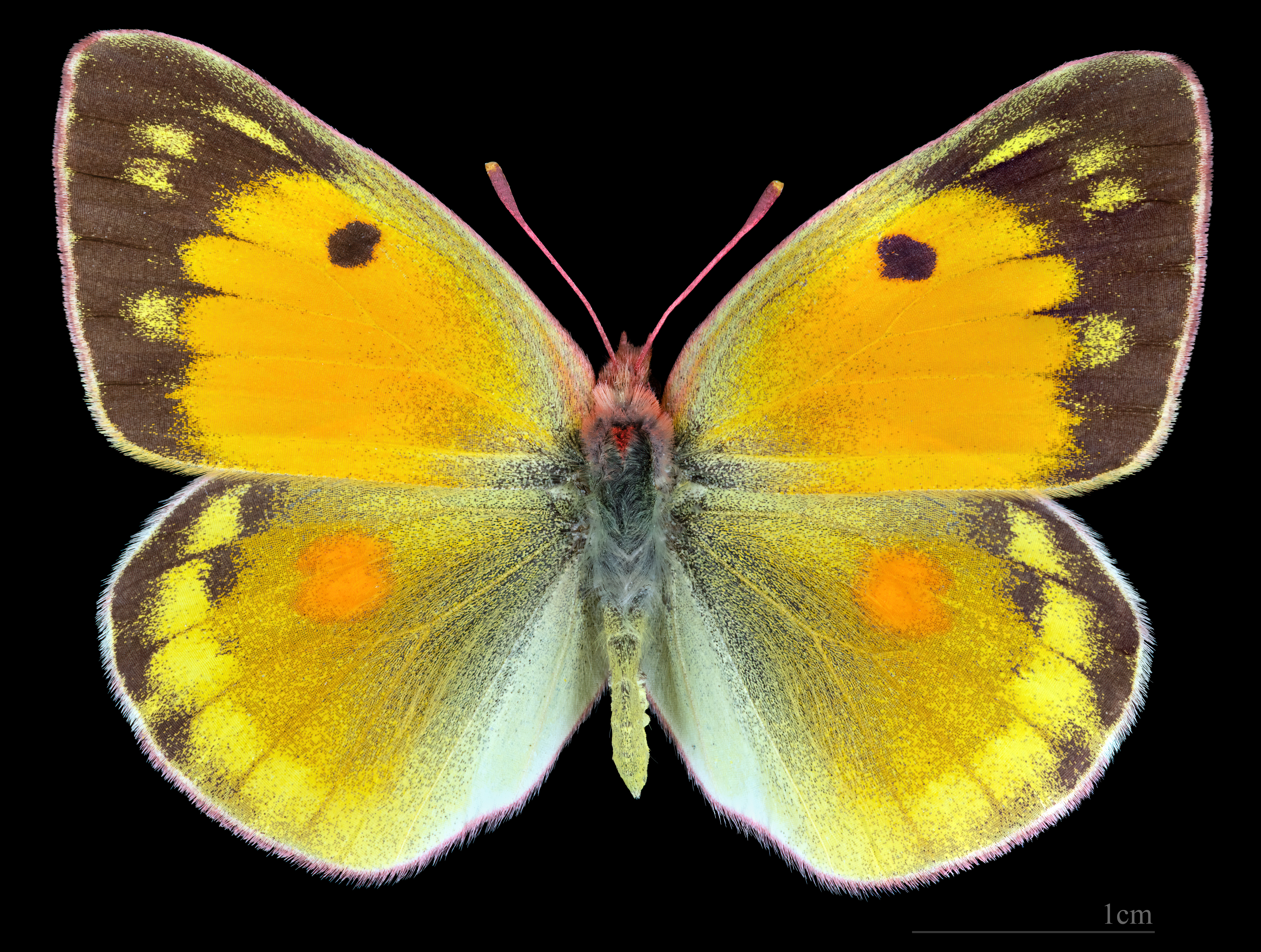
Colias myrmidone ♀

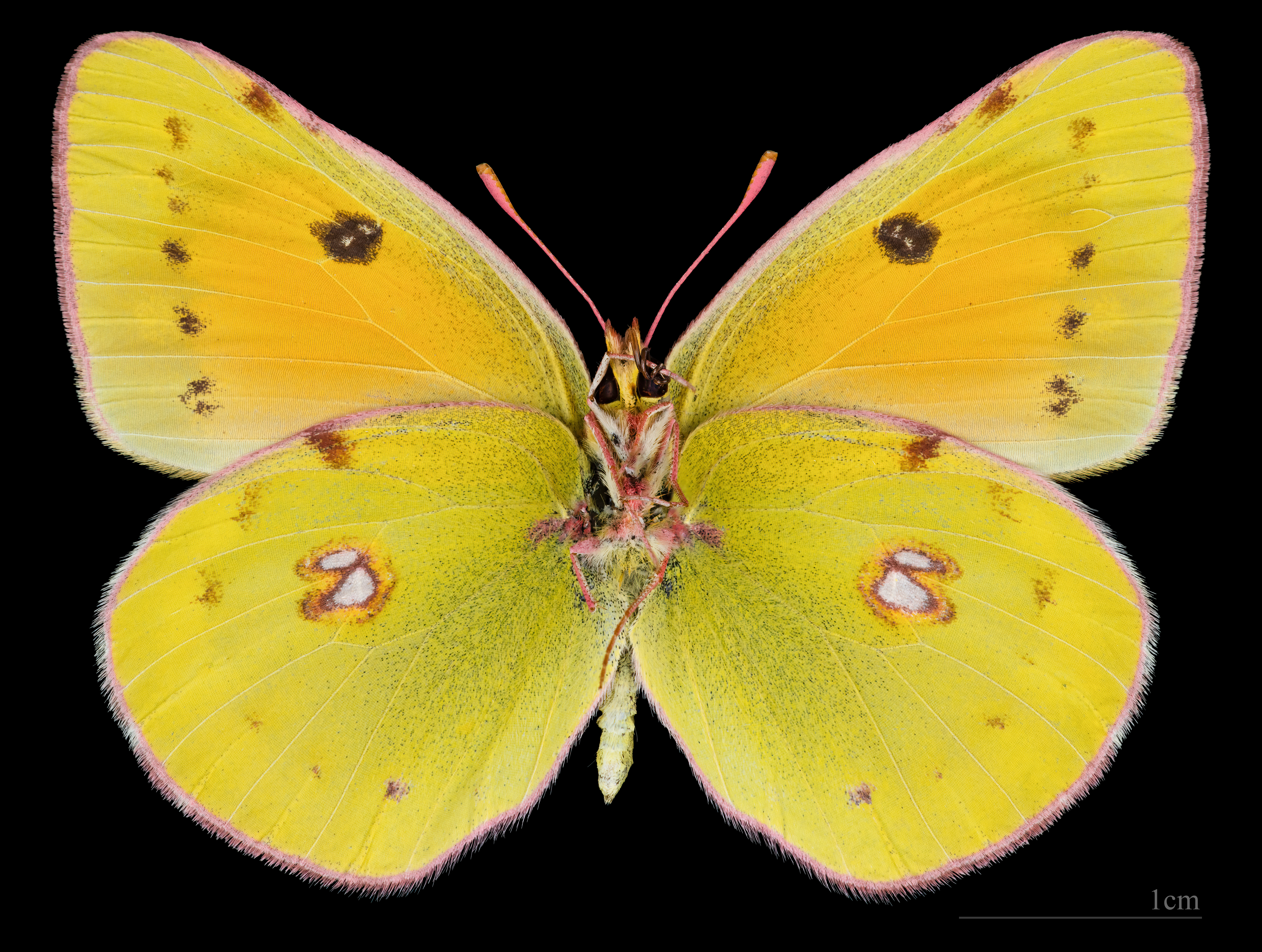
Colias myrmidone ♀ △

== Biology ==
The larvae feed on species of the flowering plant in the genus Chamaecytisus including Chamaecytisus ratisbonensis, Chamaecytisus ruthenicus and Chamaecytisus supinus. Dwarf broom prefers nutrient-poor grassland, as it is quickly overgrown by other plants on fertilized, nutrient-rich soil. But the caterpillars of the butterfly are also dependent on the soil on which their food plants grow being not oversaturated with nutrients. Because if the plants have taken up too much nitrogen from the soil, the caterpillars can not tolerate it and die.

The butterfly flies in May and again from July to August in two generations.

== Similar species ==
- Colias hyale
- Colias alfacariensis
- Colias crocea
- Colias phicomone
- Colias palaeno
- Colias chrysotheme
- Colias erate
