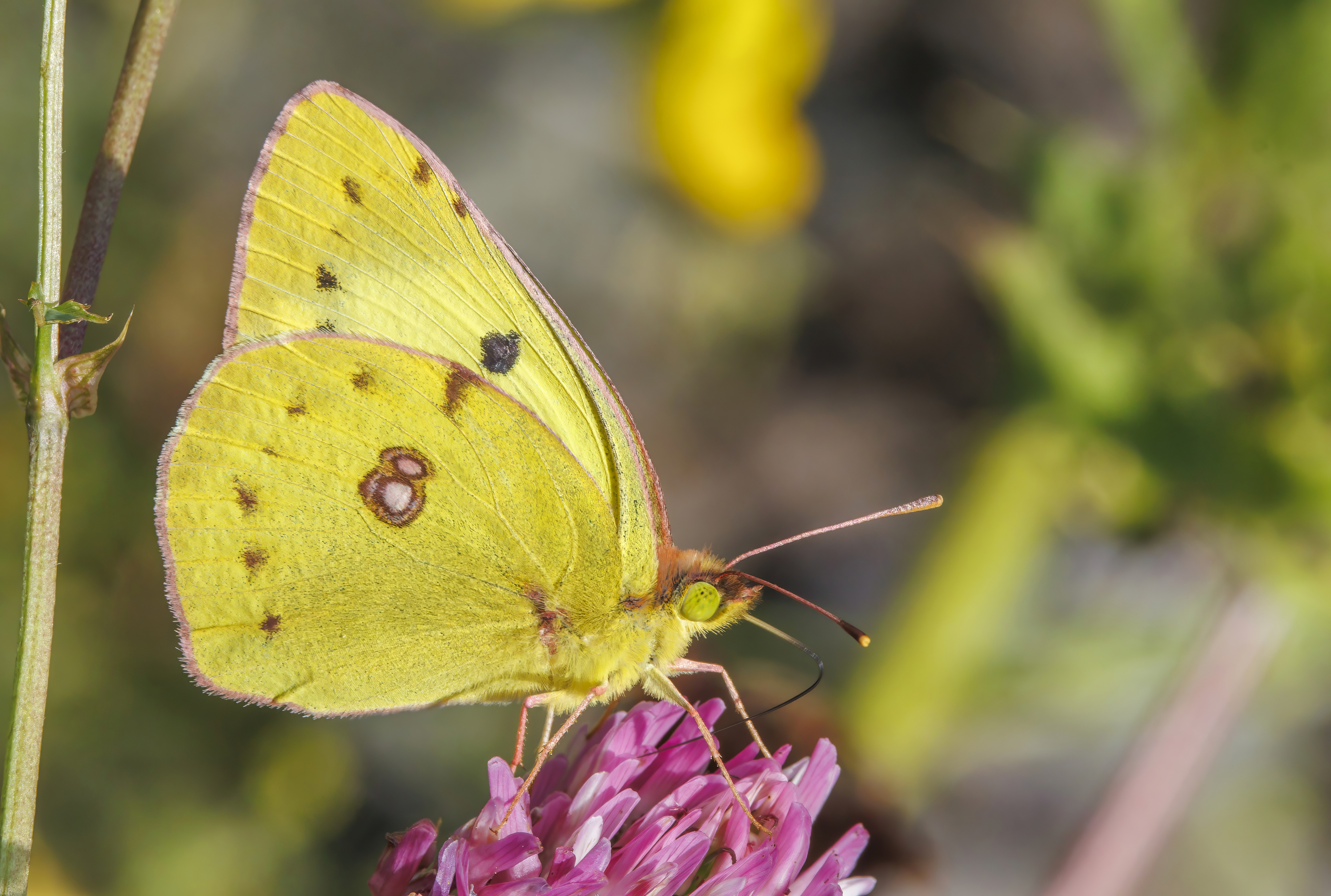

Scientific classification
- Kingdom: Animalia
- Phylum: Arthropoda
- Clade: Pancrustacea
- Class: Insecta
- Order: Lepidoptera
- Family: Pieridae
- Genus: Colias
- Species: C. alfacariensis

Binomial name
- Colias alfacariensis Ribbe, 1905

Synonyms
- Colias sareptensis Staudinger, 1871; Colias australis Verity, 1911

= Colias alfacariensis =

Berger's clouded yellow

Species of butterfly

Colias alfacariensis, Berger's clouded yellow, is a butterfly of the family Pieridae. It was separated from the pale clouded yellow, C. hyale, in 1905. Berger's clouded yellow is a Palearctic species (South and Central Europe, South Russia, Russian Far East, Siberia, Central Asia and temperate China also Asia Minor, Caucasus and Transcaucasia.

== Description ==
The wings of the male have a yellow ground colour, the females have a greenish-white ground colour, only the underside of the hind wings is yellowish. The upper wing side of both sexes has a dusted dark brown to black marginal band, which is only narrow on the hind wings. In the cell of the forewings there is a black spot on the upper and lower sides. The males have on the upperside of the hind wings in the cell an orange spot with a red border, on the underside this spot is bright and clearly outlined in red. This spot may be divided into two by the red border, so that it resembles an eight similar to Colias hyale and other yellow members of the genus Colias. In the females, the orange spot on the top of the hind wings is not bordered. The caterpillars, on the other hand, clearly differ from the caterpillars of Colias hyale after the second moult. Both caterpillars are green, however, the caterpillar of Colias alfacariensis has four eye-catching yellow lines with black dots while the caterpillar of the Colias hyale has only two thin side lines.

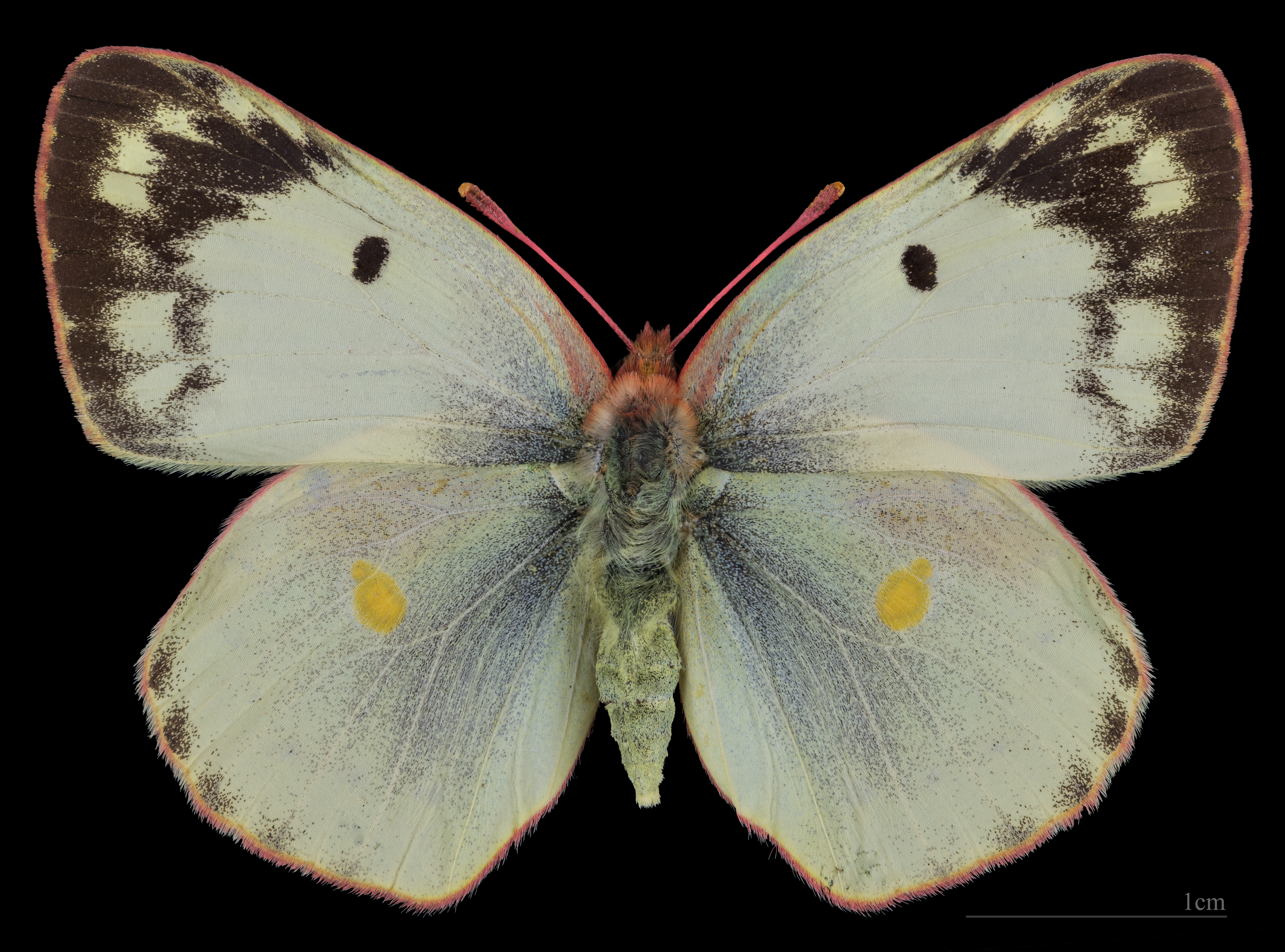
Colias alfacariensis ♀

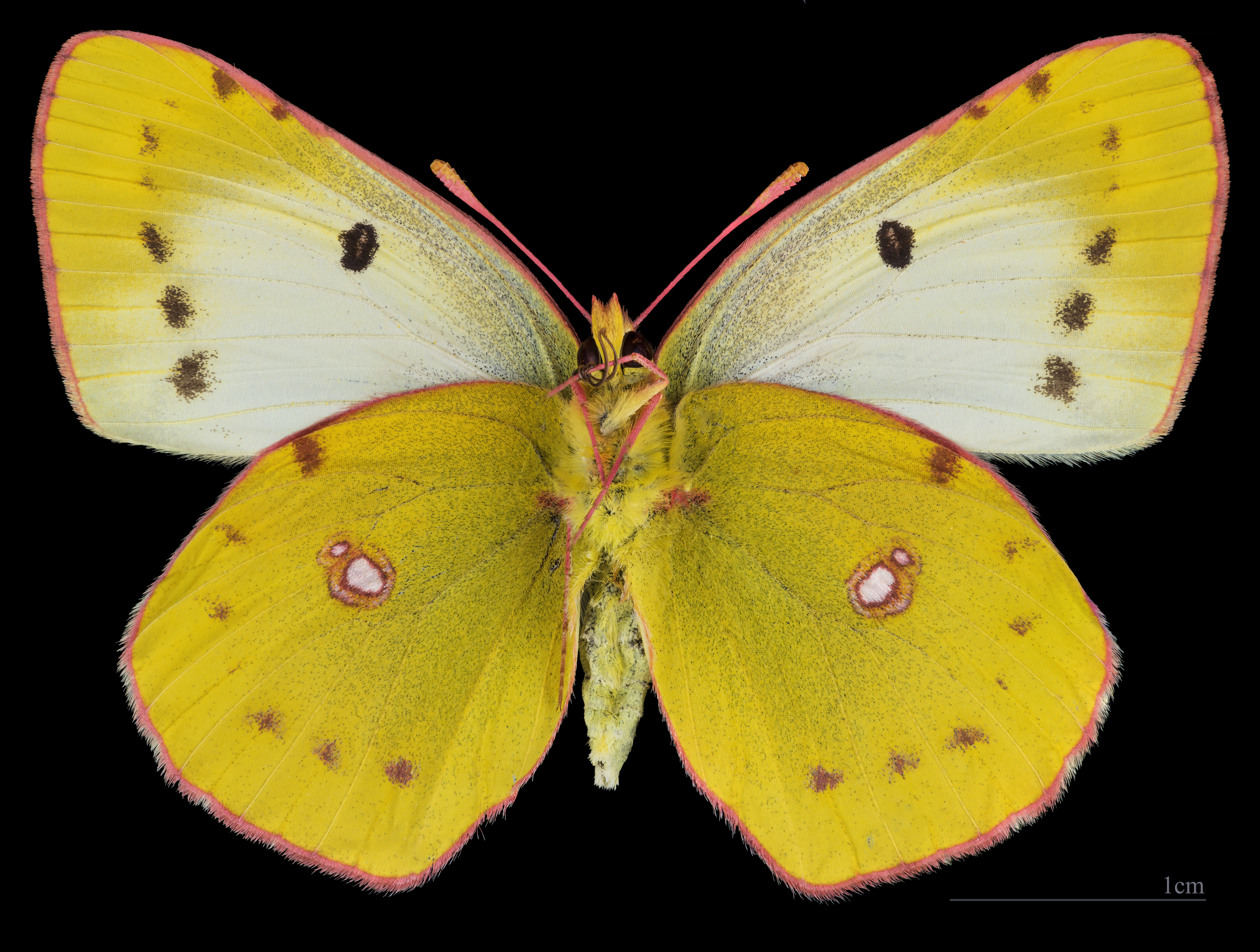
Colias alfacariensis ♀ △

Similar species

- Colias hyale Colias alfacariensis together with Colias hyale forms a kind of complex. Since the butterflies of both species develop many variations, the two species cannot be differentiated by morphology or on the basis of a genitalic examination . Information about the habitat and the geographical distribution provide only an indication of which of the two species may be involved. A safe distinction is possible only on the completely different caterpillars.
- Colias crocea
- Colias phicomone
- Colias palaeno
- Colias chrysotheme
- Colias erate

== Biology ==
The larval food plants are horseshoe vetch (Hippocrepis comosa) and crown vetch (Coronilla varia) on which the female lays the eggs. The butterfly is found on calcareous marshy and dry grasslands and in dry shrubbery or lightly forested areas. They avoid cool and rainy areas. They fly in two generations in May, June and August, September or in three generations from May to October feeding at flowers.

== Migration ==
This species is a rare vagrant to south England, the North German plain and Denmark.

== Subspecies ==
- C. a. vihorlatensis Reissinger, 1989 – Carpathians
- C. a. remota Reissinger, 1989 – S. Europe, Caucaus
- C. a. fontainei Reissinger, 1989 – Armenia, Talysh, Kopet-Dagh
- C. a. saissanica Reissinger, 1989 – S. E. Kazakhstan
