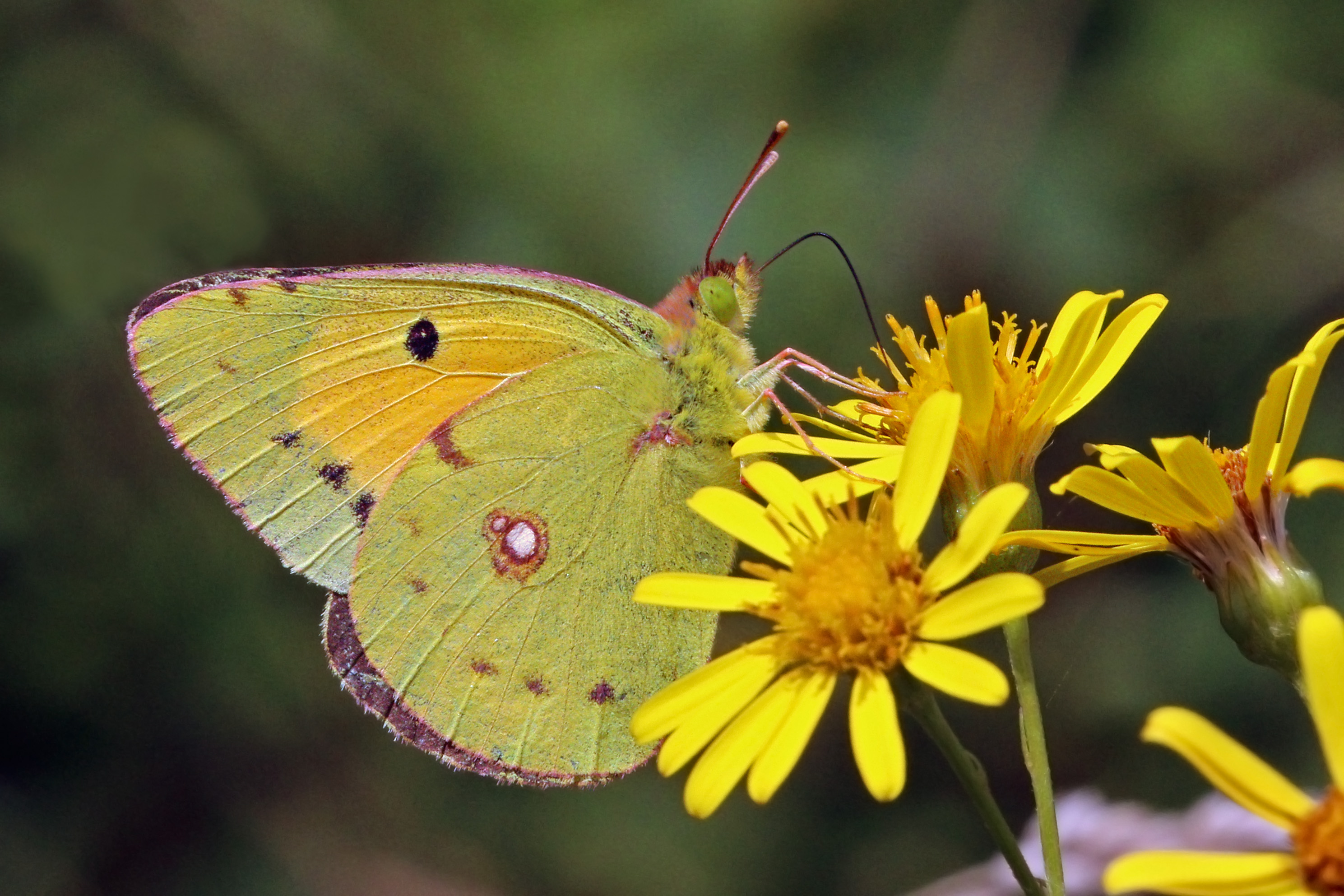
- Male. Underside
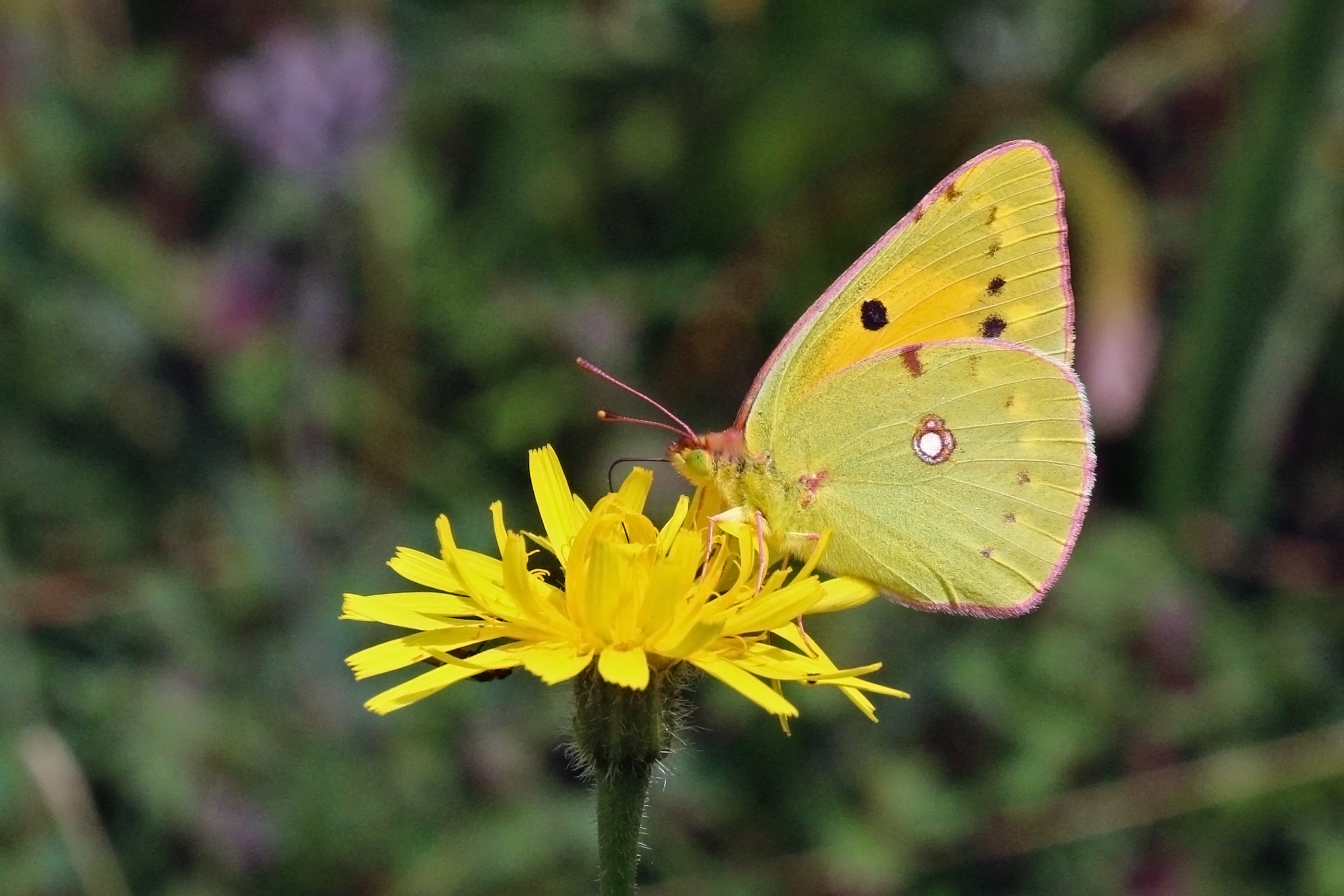
- Female both, Old Winchester Hill, Hampshire

Conservation status
- Least Concern (IUCN 3.1)

Scientific classification
- Kingdom: Animalia
- Phylum: Arthropoda
- Clade: Pancrustacea
- Class: Insecta
- Order: Lepidoptera
- Family: Pieridae
- Genus: Colias
- Species: C. croceus

Binomial name
- Colias croceus (Geoffroy, 1785)

Synonyms
- List: Colias croceus f. deserticola Verity, 1909; Colias croceus f. helice; Colias croceus f. helicina Oberthür, 1880; Colias croceus f. mediterranea Stauder, 1913; Colias edusa (Fabricius, 1787) (non Fabricius, 1777: preoccupied); Colias edusa f. obsoleta Grüber, 1929; Papilio croceus Fourcroy, 1785; Papilio edusa Fabricius, 1787 (non Fabricius, 1777: preoccupied)

= Colias croceus =

Clouded yellow

Species of butterfly

Colias croceus, the clouded yellow, is a small butterfly of the family Pieridae, the yellows and whites.

== Subspecies and forms ==
- Colias croceus croceus
- Colias croceus f. deserticola (Verity, 1909)
- Colias croceus f. helice (Hübner)
- Colias croceus f. helicina (Oberthür, 1880)
- Colias crocea f. mediterranea (Stauder, 1913)

All of these forms are usually considered synonyms of Colias croceus.

== Distribution and ecology ==
Colias croceus is one of the most widespread species in Europe. The common clouded yellow's breeding range is North Africa and southern Europe and eastwards through Turkey into the Middle East, but it occurs throughout much of Europe as a summer migrant, in good years individuals reaching Scandinavia. In Asia, its range extends into central Siberia in the north and barely into India in the south; it is not found in Central Asia.

This species is primarily an immigrant to the UK, originating from southern Europe and northern Africa. In the UK they can be seen on the south coast almost every year in varying numbers, and regularly breed there. Occurrence in the rest of the UK varies considerably from year to year, but they are increasingly observed as far north as Dumfries and Galloway. It has also been recorded in Ireland from the Raven, Co. Wexford, to Belfast, Co. Down.

A truly migratory European butterfly, this species is famous for occasional mass migrations and subsequent breeding, which are often referred to in the United Kingdom as "clouded yellow years". Notable clouded yellow years include 1877, 1947, 1983, 1992, 1994, 1996 and 2000.

== Habitat ==
These butterflies may live in any open area in the countryside, including downland, coastal cliffs and fields containing the caterpillar's host plants, at an elevation up to 1,600 metres (5,200 ft) above sea level.

== Description ==
Colias croceus has a wingspan of 45–54 millimetres (1.8–2.1 in). The upperside of the wings is golden to orange yellow with a broad black margin on all four wings and a black spot near the centre forewing. Usually these butterflies settle with their wings closed, so the black margin of the uppersides of the wings is hard to see.

The underside lacks the black borders and is lighter, with a more greenish tint, particularly on the forewings. In the forewing underside is the same dark spot as on the upperside, but often with a light centre; the hindwing underside has a white centre spot, often with a smaller white or dark dot immediately above it. Sometimes, a row of black dots occurs on the underwings' outer margins, corresponding to where the black border ends on the upperside. Females differ from the males in having yellow spots along the black borders on the upperside.

In flight, Colias croceus is easily identifiable by the intense yellow colouring, much brighter than that of the lemon-yellow male common brimstone which also lacks black markings. Like all Colias species they never open their wings at rest.

In about 5% of females, the golden upperside colouration is replaced by a pale cream colour. These females have been distinguished as form helice. The pale form helice does not seem to be distinct, as intermediates exist, and the variation is to some extent related to humidity during development, with dryer conditions producing paler colouration. These pale forms helice can be confused with Berger's clouded yellow (Colias alfacariensis) and the rarer pale clouded yellow (Colias hyale). Even the palest C. croceus tends to have more black on the upperside, however, in particular on the hindwings.

Young caterpillars are yellow-green with a black head. Later they become completely dark green, with a white red-spotted lateral line after the third moult. The pupae are green and have a yellow side stripe.

This species is similar to Colias myrmidone, Colias chrysotheme, Colias erate, Colias hyale, Colias alfacariensis, Colias caucasica, Colias aurorina.

=== Life cycle and larval host plants ===
Adults fly from March to October. In southern Europe and North Africa they breed continuously throughout the year. Eggs are laid singly on food plant leaves. Usually an extraordinary number of eggs – up to 600 – are laid from a single female.

The caterpillars grow fast in warm weather, sometimes pupating within a month. Caterpillars have 4 moults in total. The pupa remains attached to a foodplant stem by a silk girdle. Pupation lasts for two or three weeks and in good years there can be as many as three generations per year, with adults still on the wing at the beginning of November.

Larvae feed on a variety of leguminous plants, namely Faboideae (Trifolium pratense, Medicago sativa, Medicago lappacea, Medicago hispida, Medicago polymorpha, Medicago sulcata, Vicia, Lotus, Onobrychis, Astragalus, Colutea arborescens, Hippocrepis, and Anthyllis species). In the UK wild and cultivated clovers (Trifolium) and alfalfa (Medicago sativa) are favourites; less frequently, common bird's-foot trefoil Lotus corniculatus is eaten.

Adults feed primarily on nectar of thistles (Cirsium spp. and Carduus spp.), knapweeds (Centaurea spp.), dandelion (Taraxacum), fleabane (Pulicaria dysenterica), marjoram (Origanum vulgare), ragwort (Senecio jacobaea), and vetches (Vicia spp.).

== Gallery ==
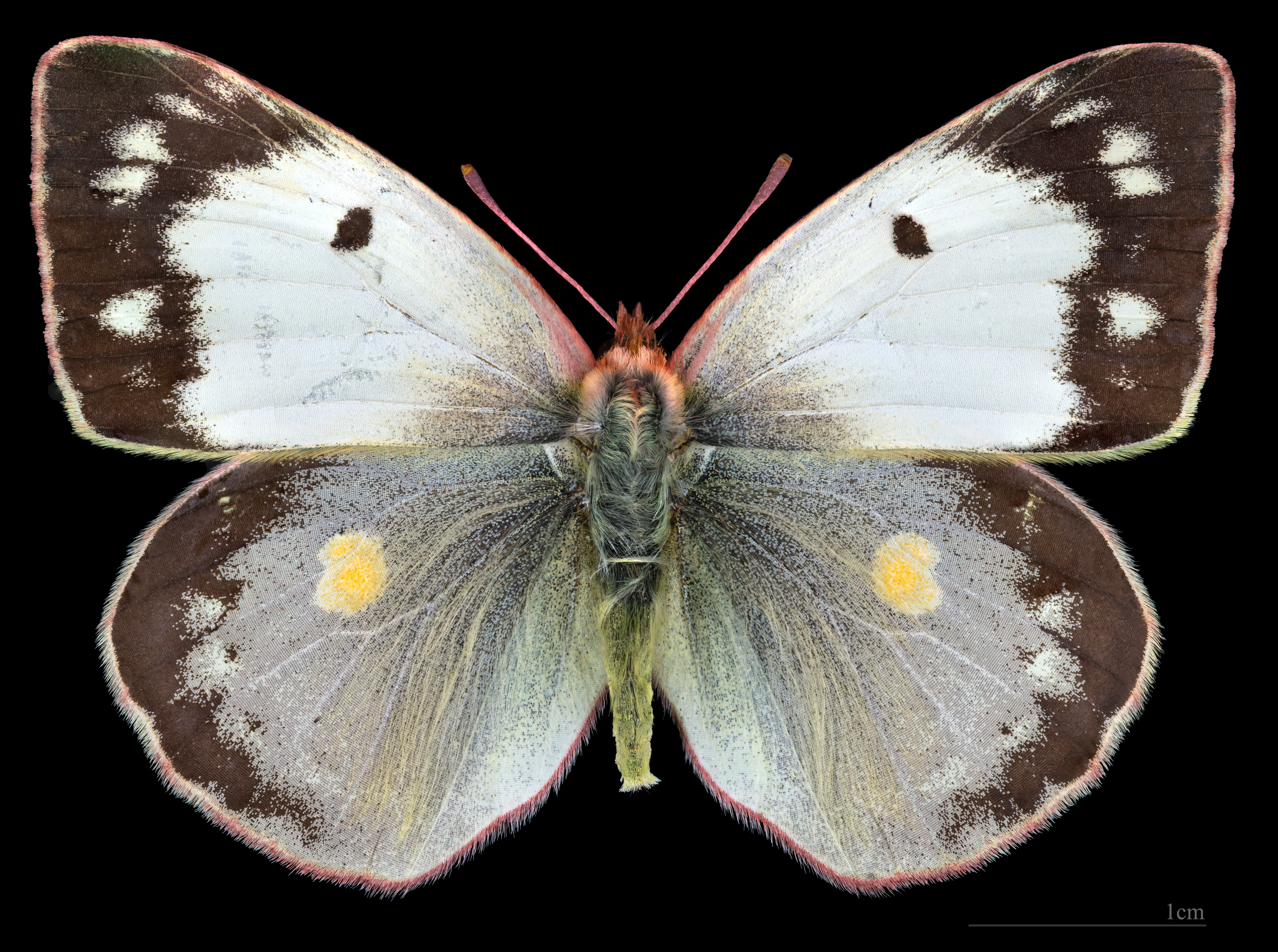
Colias croceus f. helice

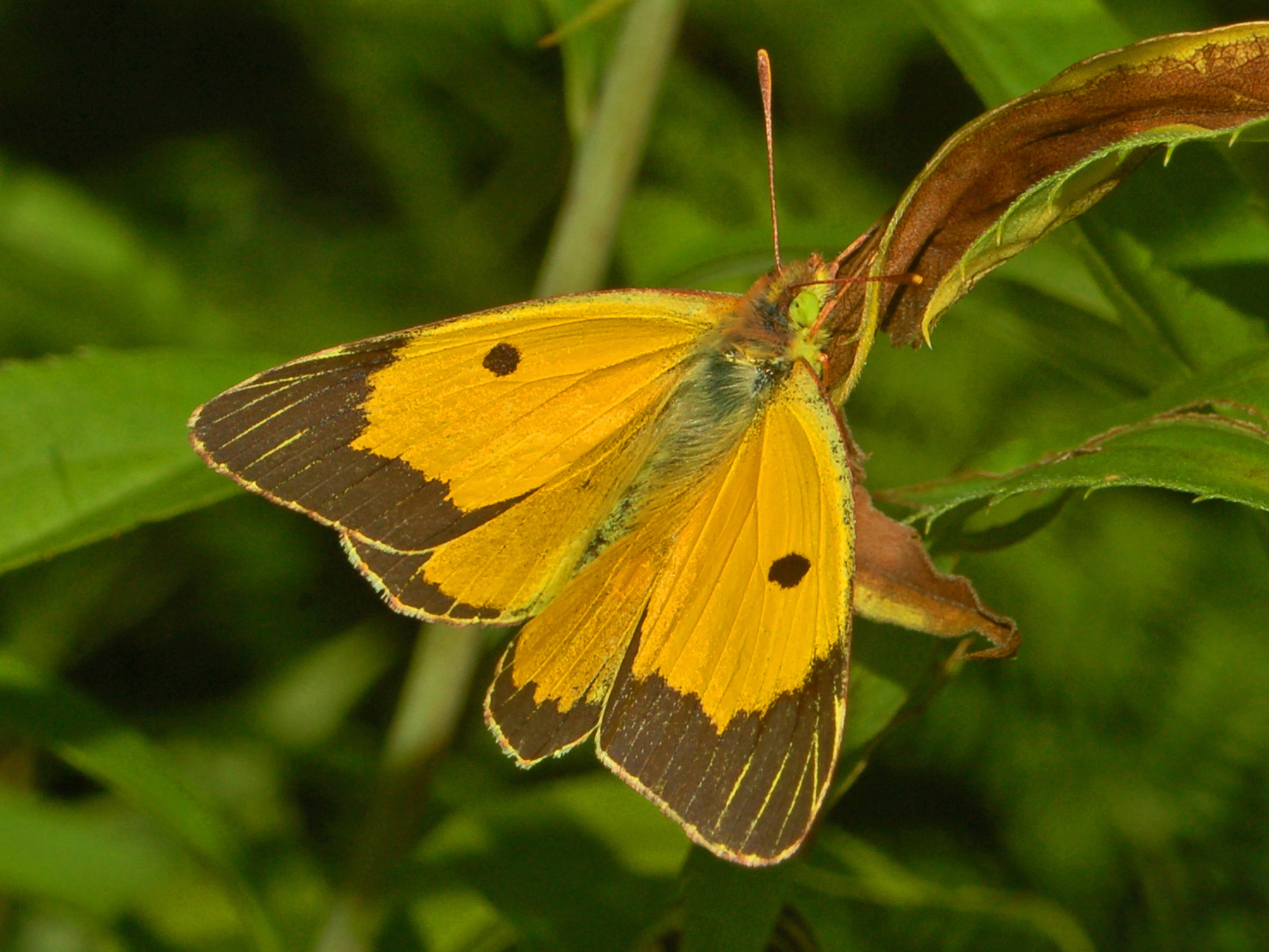
Male

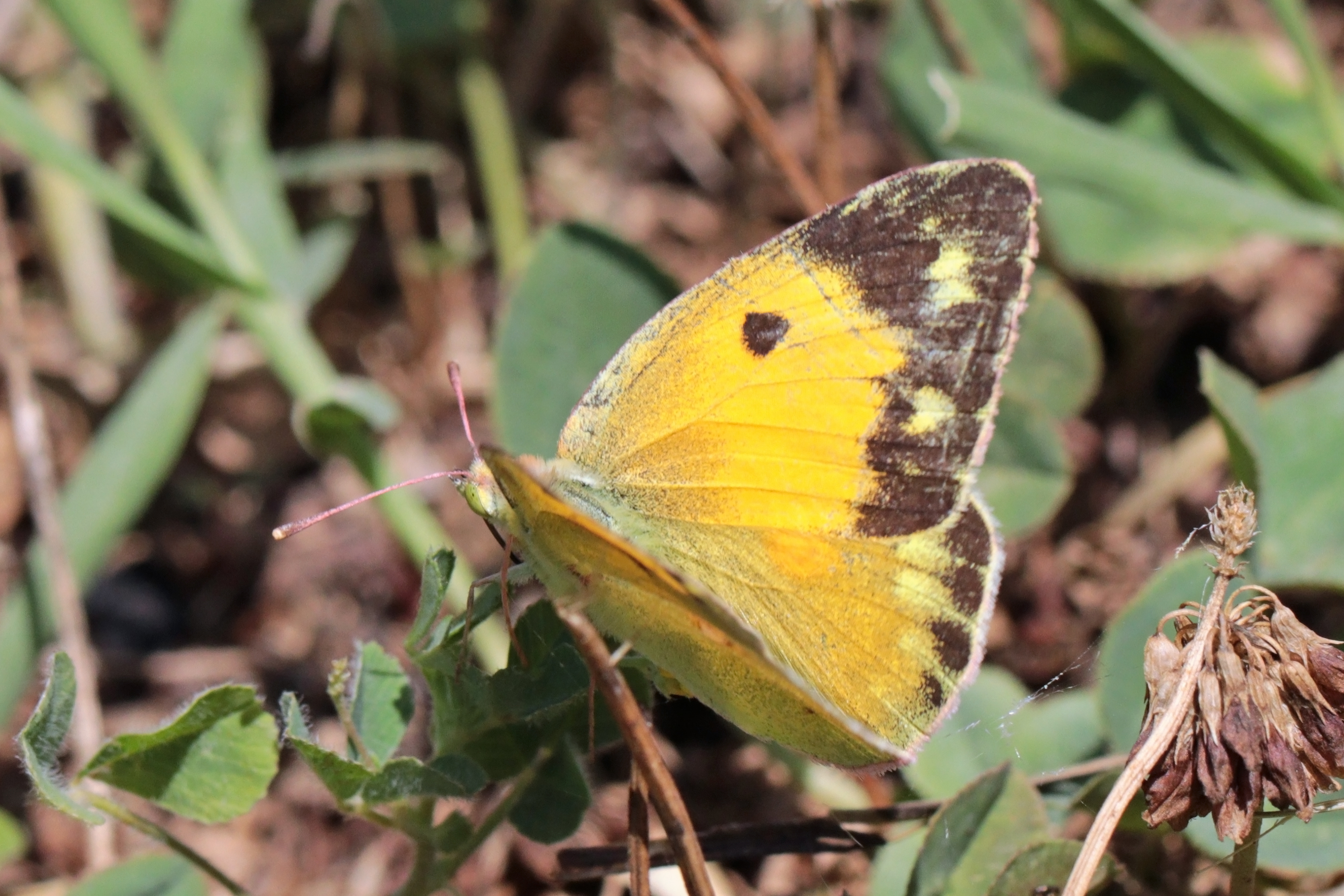
Female

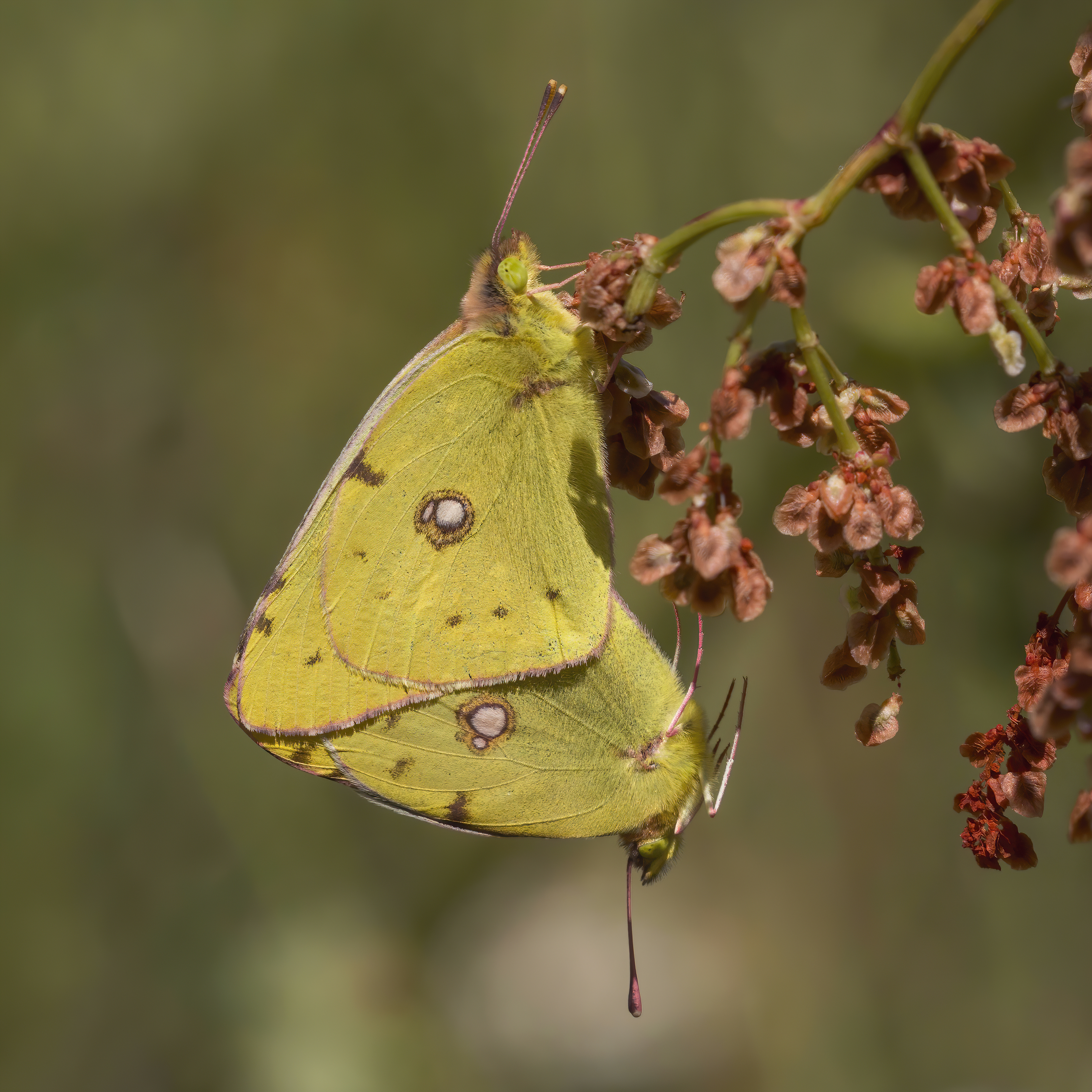
Mating

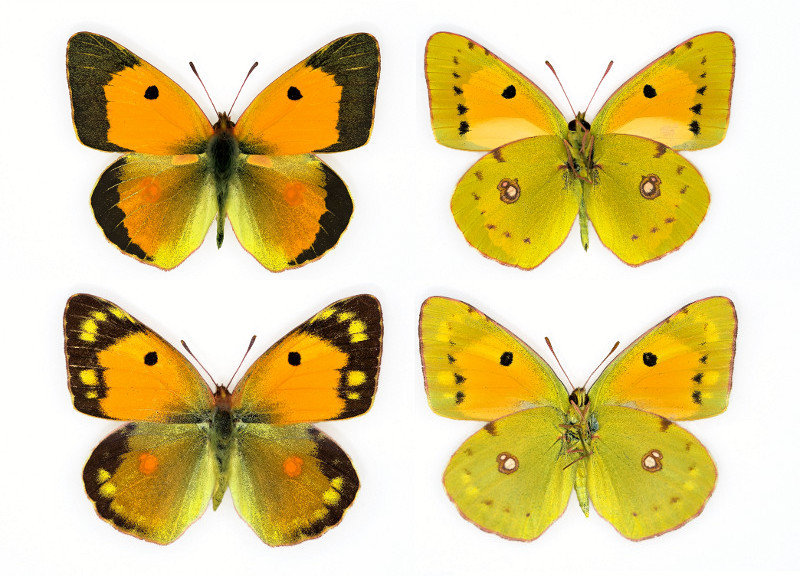
Mounted specimen. Male (up) and female (down)

== See also ==
- List of butterflies of India (Pieridae)
- List of butterflies of Great Britain

== Bibliography ==
- Asher, Jim; Warren, Martin; Fox, Richard; Harding, Paul; Jeffcoate, Gail & Jeffcoate, Stephen (2001): The Millennium Atlas of Butterflies of Britain and Ireland. Oxford University Press. ISBN 0-19-850565-5
- Evans, W.H. (1932). The Identification of Indian Butterflies (2nd ed.). Mumbai, India: Bombay Natural History Society.
- Wynter-Blyth, Mark Alexander (1957). Butterflies of the Indian Region. Bombay, India: Bombay Natural History Society. ISBN 978-8170192329.
