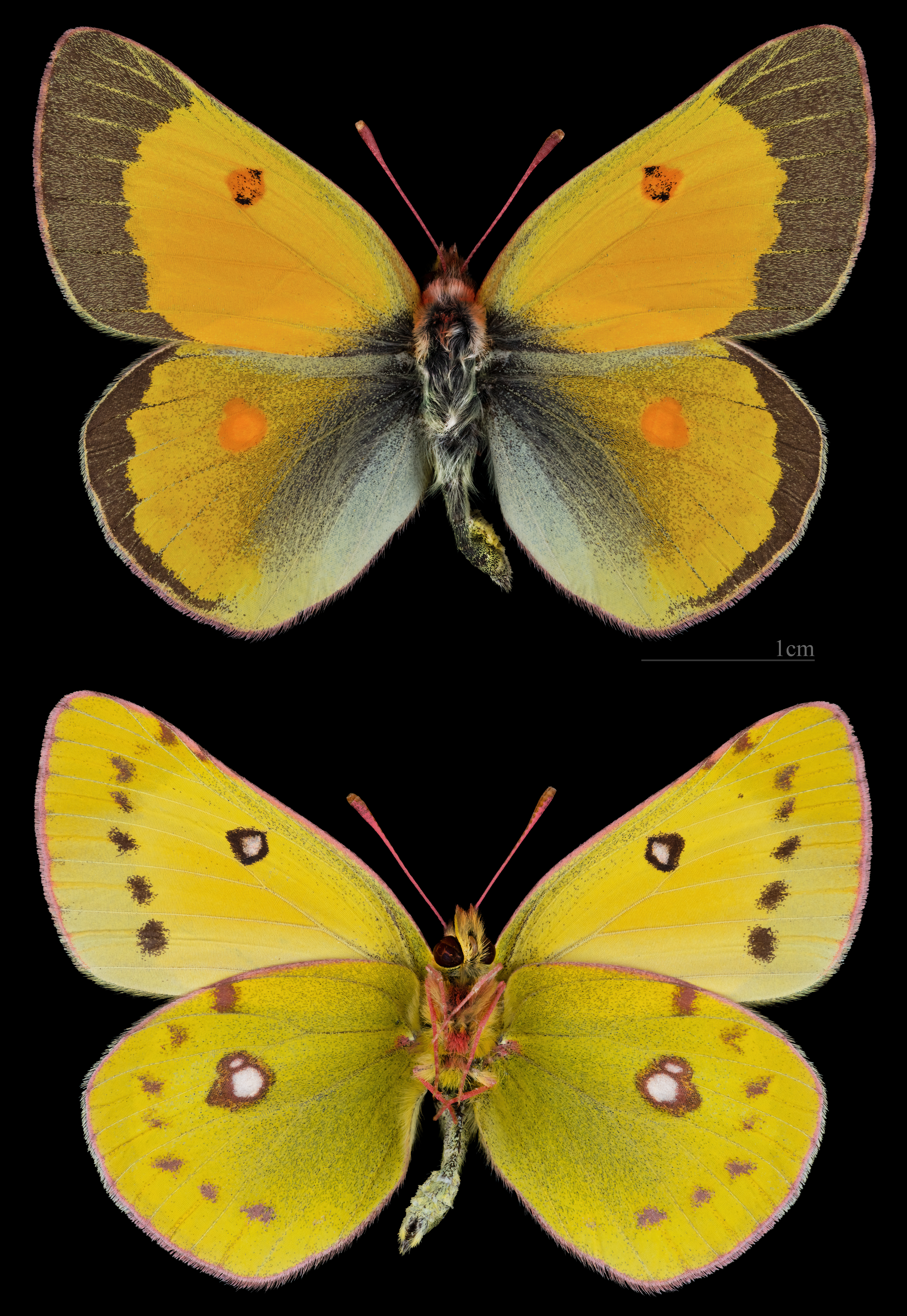
- Colias chrysotheme ♂

Scientific classification
- Kingdom: Animalia
- Phylum: Arthropoda
- Clade: Pancrustacea
- Class: Insecta
- Order: Lepidoptera
- Family: Pieridae
- Genus: Colias
- Species: C. chrysotheme

Binomial name
- Colias chrysotheme Esper, 1781

= Colias chrysotheme =

Lesser clouded yellow

Species of butterfly

Colias chrysotheme, the lesser clouded yellow, is a small Palearctic butterfly belonging to the family Pieridae.

== Description ==
The female is white, with a tinge of yellow green. The male is pale yellow on the upper wing, and the edges are black or dark gray with a reddish fringe. Colias chrysotheme is the smallest of the three orange yellowing species found in Central Europe and has a wing span of 36 to 44 millimeters, with the second generation imagines often being slightly larger than the first generation. The wing upper side of the males is orange-yellow coloured and has a dark outer marginal band, which is narrower on the hindwing. The orange colour is slightly weaker than that of Colias croceus and much weaker than in Colias myrmidone. The yellow veins in the dark outer marginal band are in chrysotheme recognizable on the anterior and posterior wings, whereas in croceus these are usually present only on the forewings tips and yellow veins are completely absent in myrmidone. In both sexes there is a black-brown spot in the cell of the forewing upper side and on the rear wing upper side a red spot. The females are recognizable by a greenish front edge of the forewing upper side and yellow spots in the submarginal. Whitish forms are extremely rare. The egg is cylindrical, with conical tip, first whitish, yellowish before hatching. The larva is green and has a white, red interrupted side stripe, but may vary in colour. The pupa is green-yellow with dark spots.

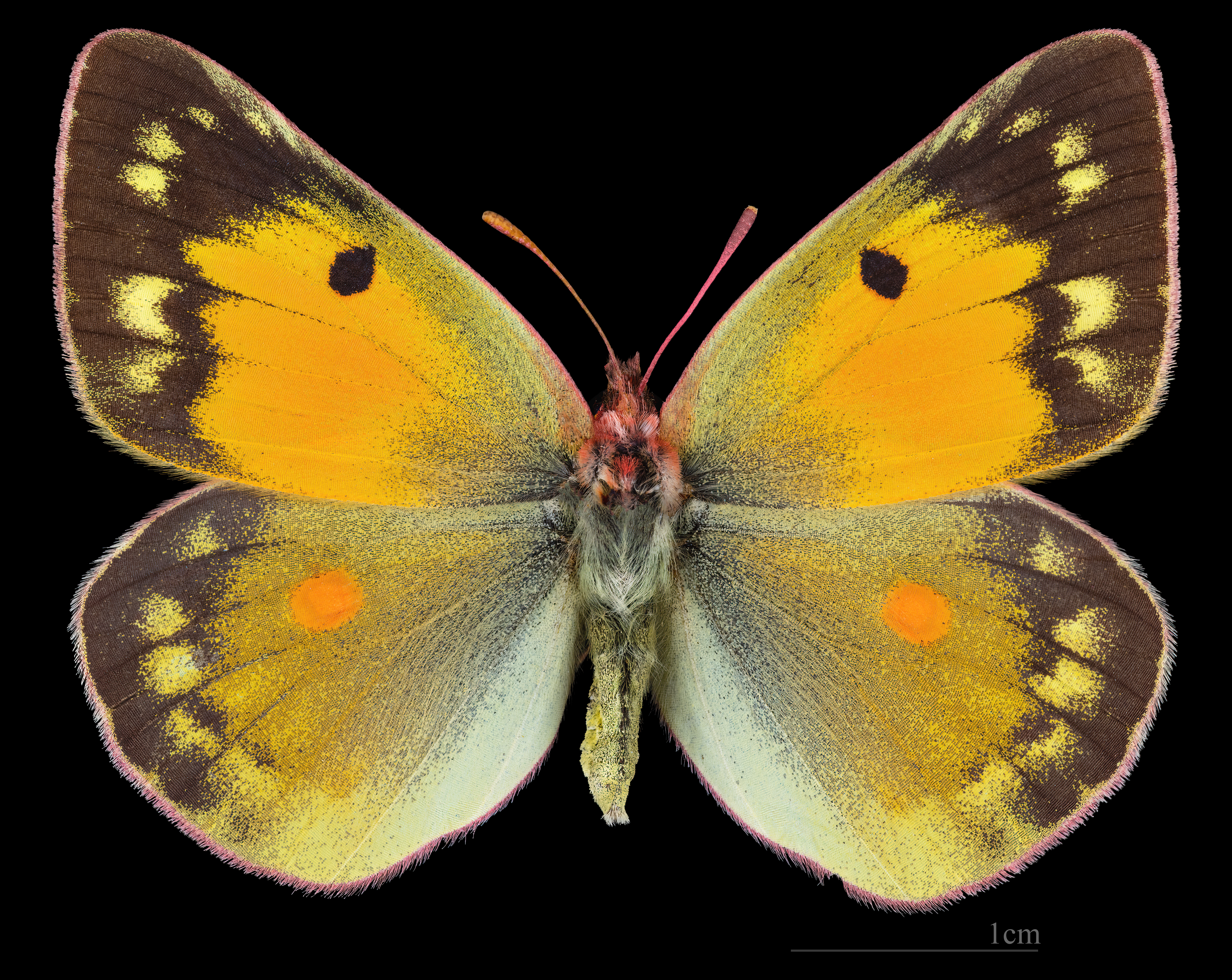
Colias chrysotheme ♀

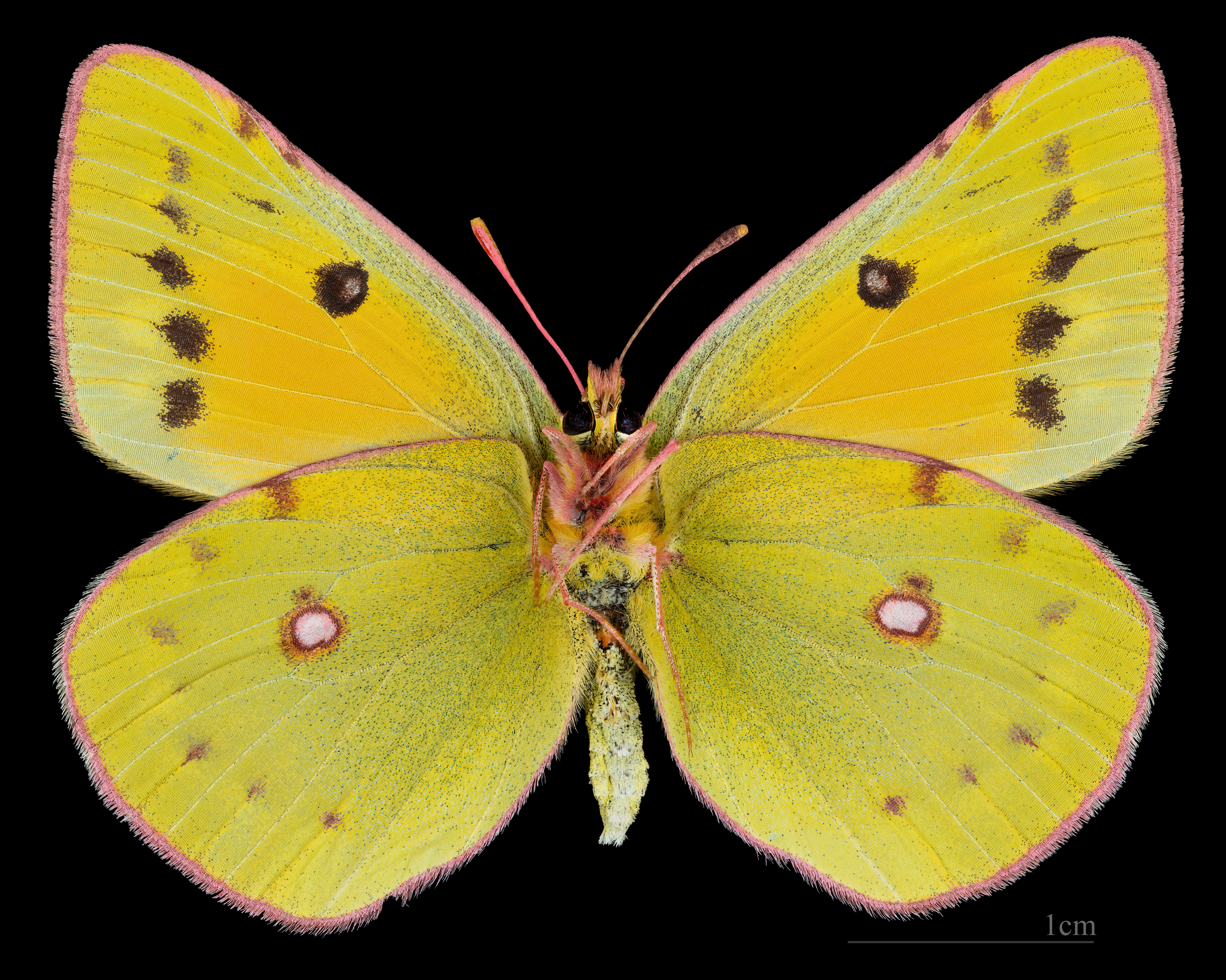
Colias chrysotheme ♀ △

== Similar species ==
- Colias myrmidone
- Colias croceus
- Colias erate (only in the orange colored form of the male)

== Subspecies ==
The following subspecies are recognized:

- Colias chrysotheme chrysotheme (Esper, 1781) more greenish-yellow in spring, more orange-yellow in summer (form and others from Lake Neusiedl to southern Russia ).
- Colias chrysotheme audre (Hemming, 1833) smaller and of pale yellow-orange ground color and broad marginal band in the males and strong yellow spots in the submarginal band (form and others east of Lake Baikal in Siberia and Mongolia ).
- Colias chrysotheme elena (Gorbunov, 1995) larger, usually darker orange form in males and less extensive spots in submarginal band in females. (mountain form and others in the Altai, Sayan and Tuwa mountains and higher elevations of Mongolia ).

== Distribution and habitat ==
In Eastern Central Europe in Lower Austria, in Burgenland (Lake Neusiedl), in Hungary then east to Romania, Ukraine, South Russia, Kazakhstan, South Siberia, Mongolia and Palearctic parts of China.

It favors flowered meadows, sparse forests, plains and steppe at altitudes below 2,000 m.

== Biology ==
The caterpillar feeds on Astragalus species, such as Astragalus austriacus , as well as on Salix and Coronilla plants. The butterflies prefer to fly in the sunshine over steppe areas and feed on the nectar of various meadow flowers. Due to increasing use of fertilizer on barren meadows, the habitat of the species is becoming increasingly limited. The imago flies in April / May and from August to September in two to three generations. The caterpillars of the last generation overwinter after the second moult.

== Etymology ==
Colias chrysotheme is named in the Classical tradition. The specific epithet derives from Chrysothemis one of the daughters of Danaus in Greek mythology.
