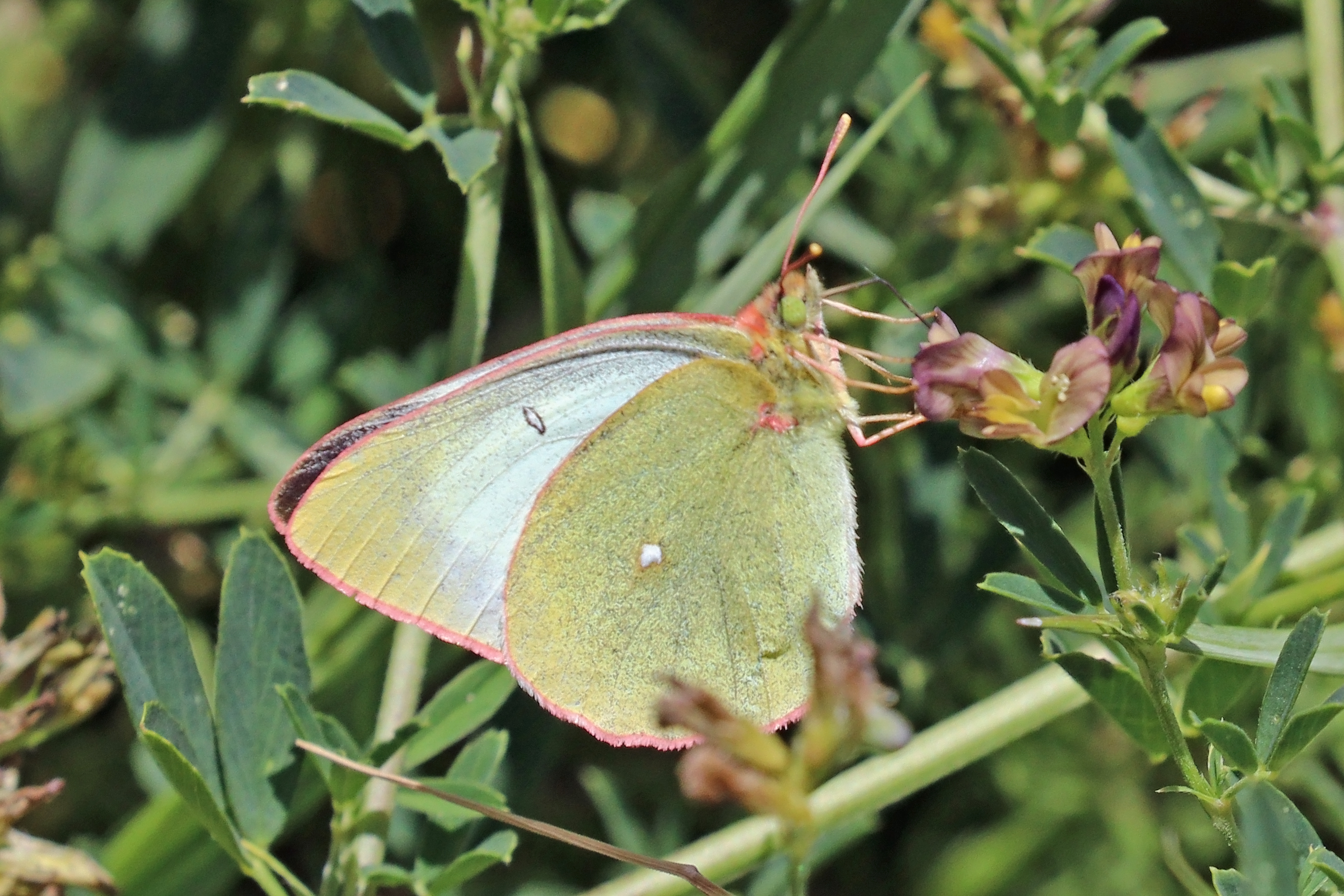
- C. p. palaeno, Sweden
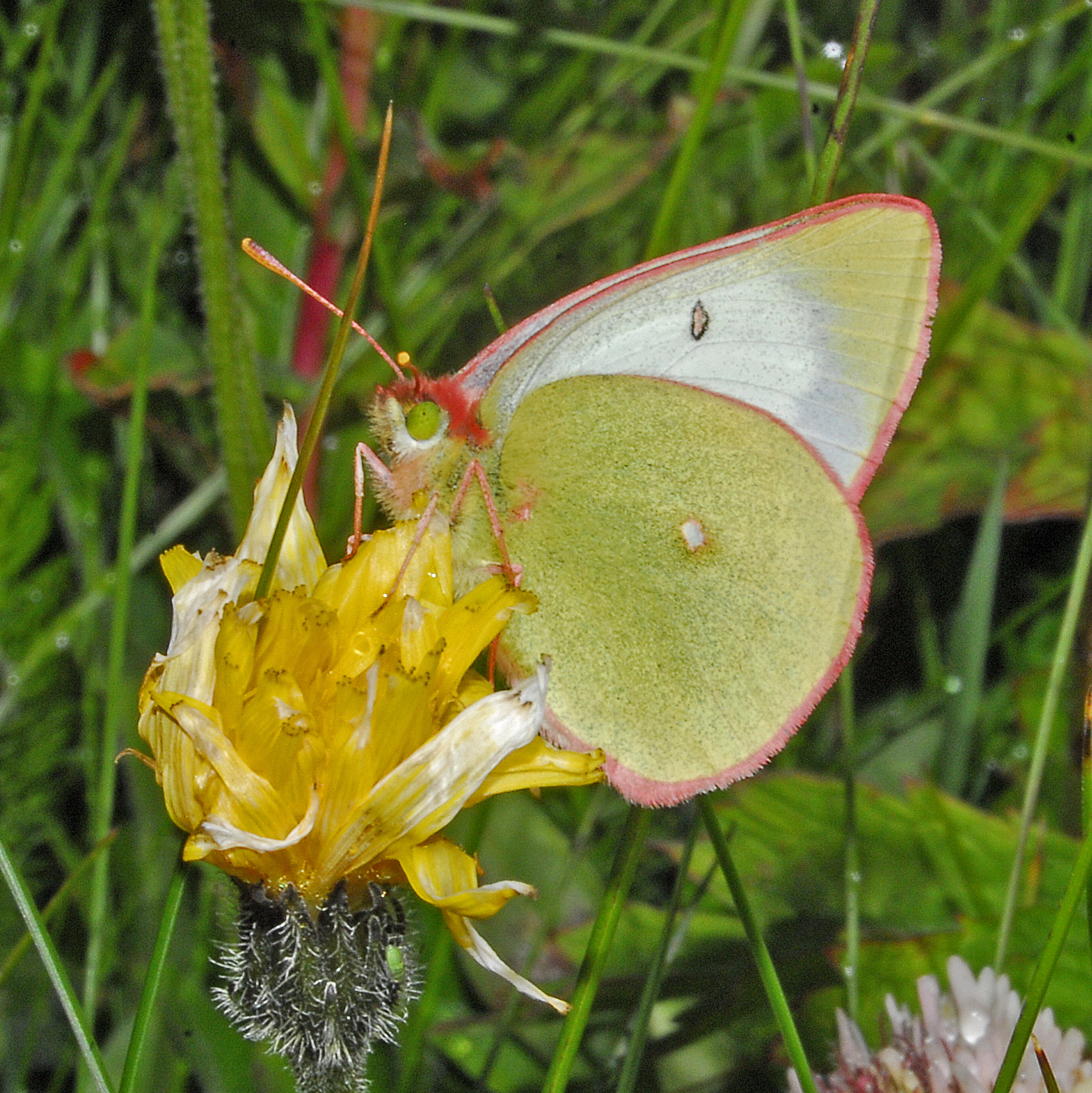
- C. p. europomene, female

Conservation status
- Secure (NatureServe)

Scientific classification
- Kingdom: Animalia
- Phylum: Arthropoda
- Clade: Pancrustacea
- Class: Insecta
- Order: Lepidoptera
- Family: Pieridae
- Genus: Colias
- Species: C. palaeno

Binomial name
- Colias palaeno (Linnaeus, 1761)

Subspecies
- Several, see text

= Colias palaeno =

Species of butterfly

Colias palaeno, known by the common names moorland clouded yellow, palaeno sulphur, and pale Arctic clouded yellow, is a butterfly in the family Pieridae.

== Subspecies ==
Subspecies include:

- Colias palaeno palaeno – Sweden, Norway, Finland, and Estonia
- Colias palaeno aias Fruhstorfer, 1903 – Japan the largest form of palaeno, the marginal band of the forewing being very broad and the underside rich green
- Colias palaeno baffinensis Ebner & Ferris, [1978] – northern North America
- Colias palaeno chippewa W.H. Edwards, 1870 – northern North America, may be a separate species (C. chippewa)
- Colias palaeno europome (Esper, 1778) – Belgium, Germany, Slovakia, Romania, and Ukraine
- Colias palaeno europomene Ochsenheimer, 1808 – high altitude in the Alps. This form is somewhat larger than the nominate, the male lemon-yellow above, being below deeper yellow, as is also the female.
- Colias palaeno orientalis Staudinger, 1892 – Kamchatka very similar to europomene, being dark greenish on the underside of the hindwing
- Colias palaeno poktusani O. Bang-Haas, 1934 – North Korea
- Colias palaeno sachalinensis Matsumura, 1919 – Sakhalin
- Colias palaeno synonyma Bryk, 1923 – Sweden, Denmark

Colias aias is treated as a full species by some authors.

== Distribution ==
Colias palaeno is a Holarctic species, widespread through Asia, Europe and North America. It is present in central and northern Europe from eastern France to the Baltic States and northern Sweden, Norway, Finland and to the eastern Europe, then in eastern Siberia, in the Chukchi Peninsula, in Japan and in northern areas of North America.

== Habitat ==
This species inhabits various types of moorland, forest meadows, open coniferous forests and open areas which may contain scrub. In the southern areas of its range it is a high alpine species reaching an elevation over 1,500 metres (4,900 ft) above sea level, but it can be found on upland bogs at an elevation of about 1,000 metres (3,300 ft). Though the species is normally restricted to these habitats, occasionally it is found far from suitable breeding grounds.

== Description ==
Colias palaeno has a wingspan of 46–50 millimetres (1.8–2.0 in) in males, of 50–52 millimetres (2.0–2.0 in) in females. Upperside of male pale yellow with blackish brown distal margins, pale-centred dark middle spot to the forewing and light middle pot to the hindwing; fringes red. Underside of forewing pale yellow with white-centred dark middle spot, the costal and distal edges being red; hindwing yellow, strongly dusted with fuscous, the large middle spot being mother-of-pearl colour, and the fringes red. The female has a white ground colour above, the underside of the forewing being white proximally, yellow at apex, the hindwing being somewhat paler in the female than in the male.

The larva is sea-green, velvety, bearing minute black dots; a lateral stripe bright yellow edged with black beneath, below the same the white black-edged spiracles; underside and abdominal legs dull green, thoracic legs yellowish, head green. The Pupa is greenish yellow, the back being strongly convex.

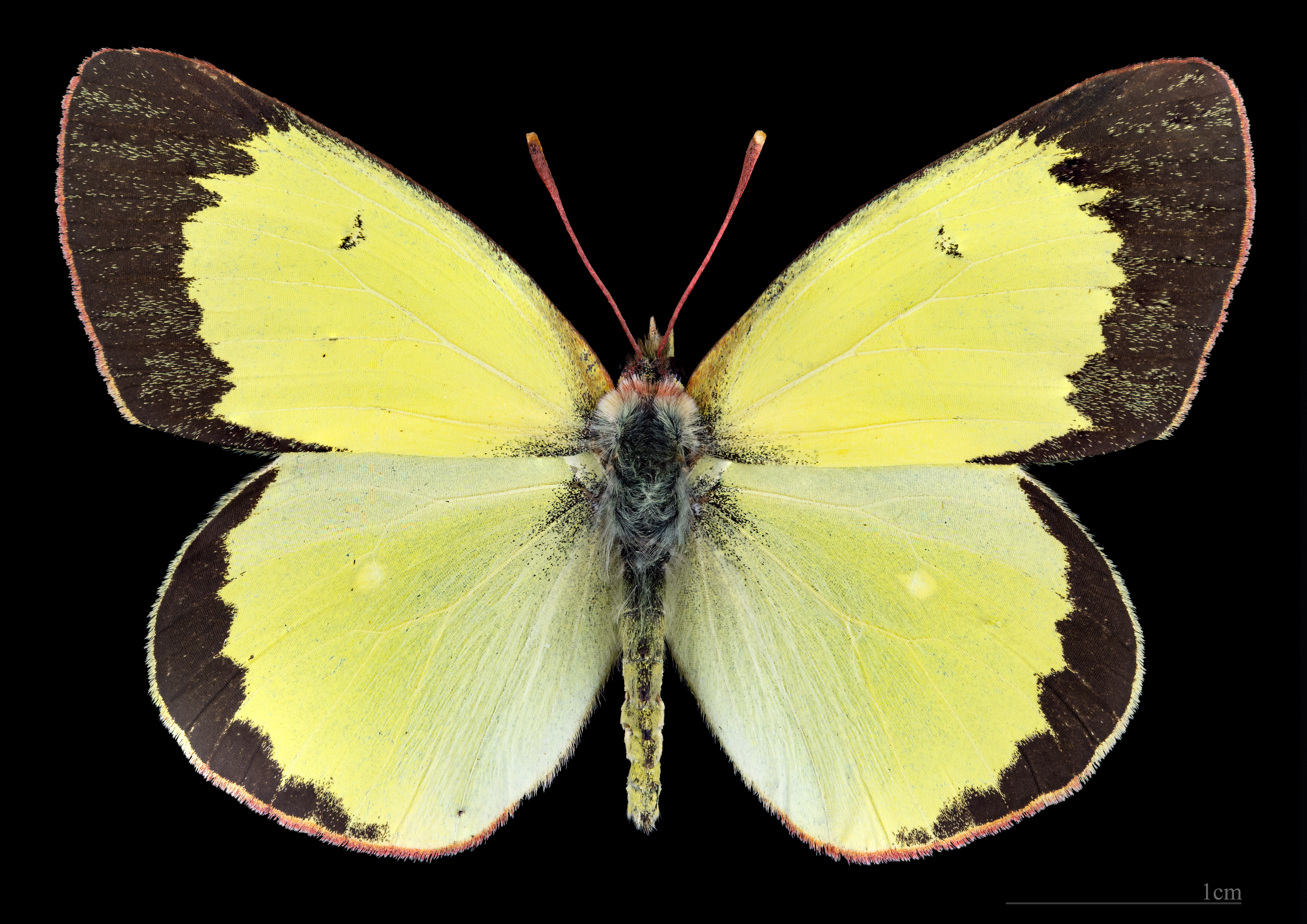
Colias palaeno ♂

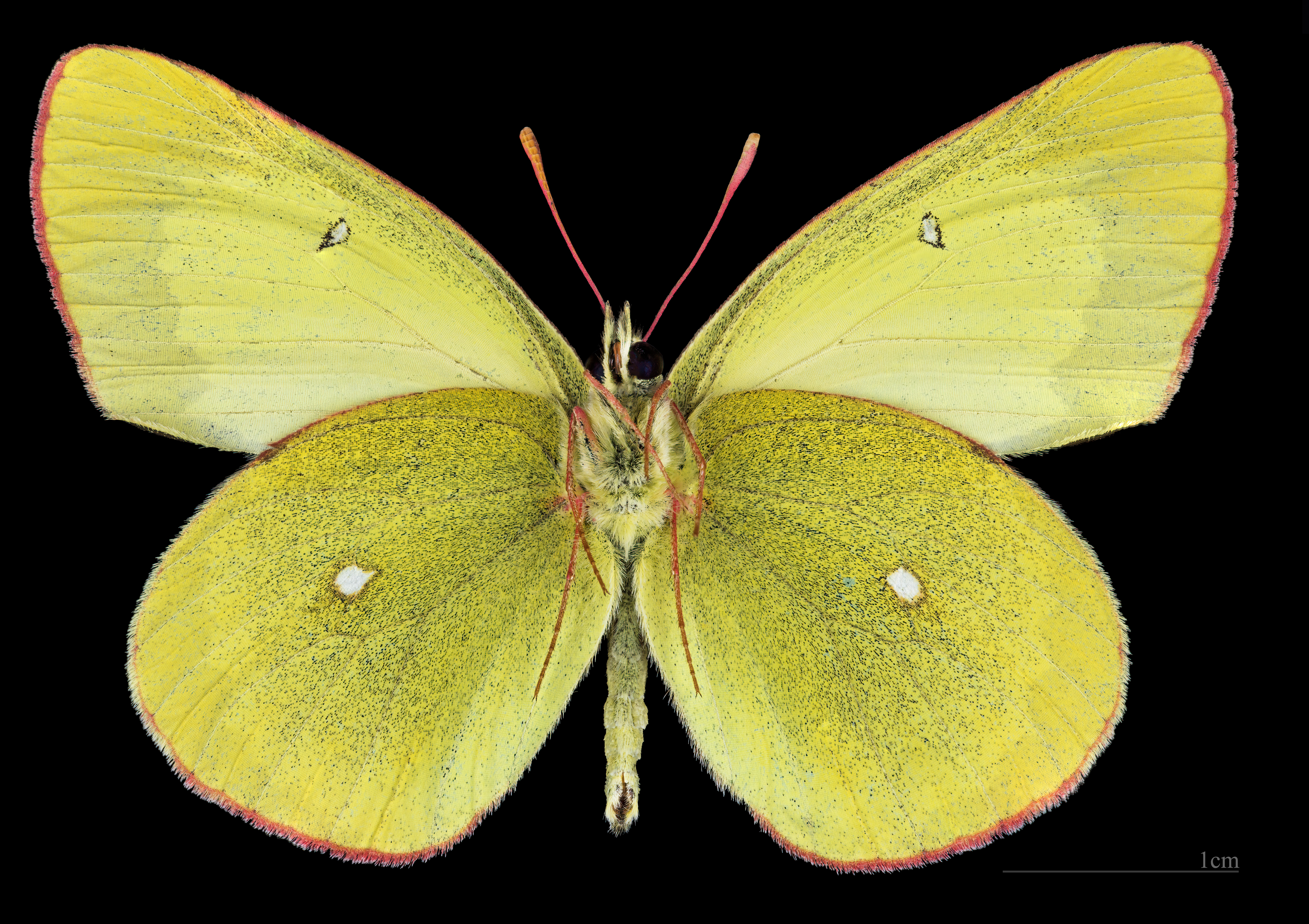
Colias palaeno ♂ △

== Biology ==
It is a univoltine species, flying from June to August. As most Colias-species, Colias palaeno is an avid flyer. The larva is found on bog bilberry (Vaccinium uliginosum), on Vaccinium myrtillus and on Vaccinium caespitosum.

== Gallery ==
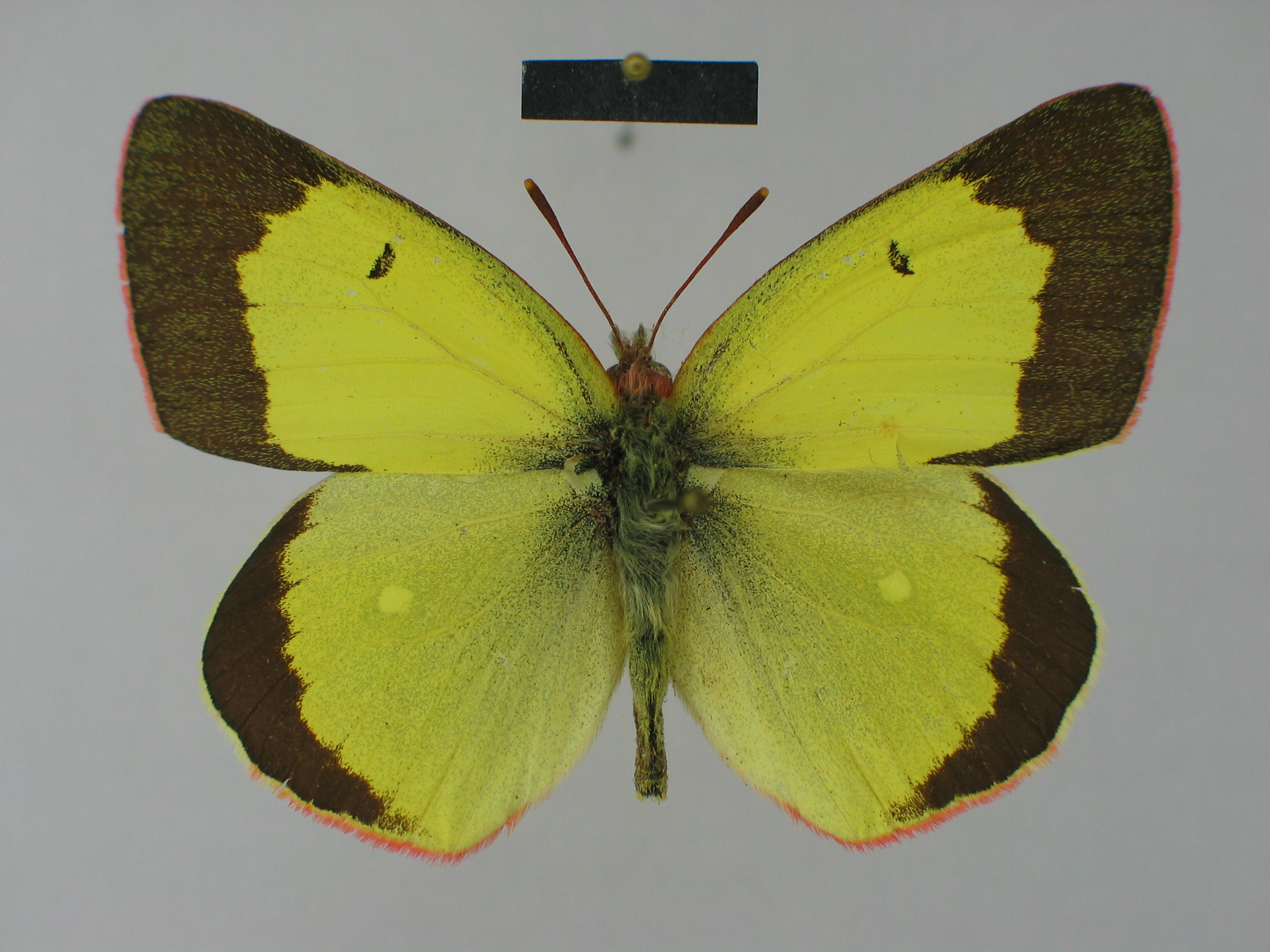
Colias palaeno poktussani . Male, dorsal side

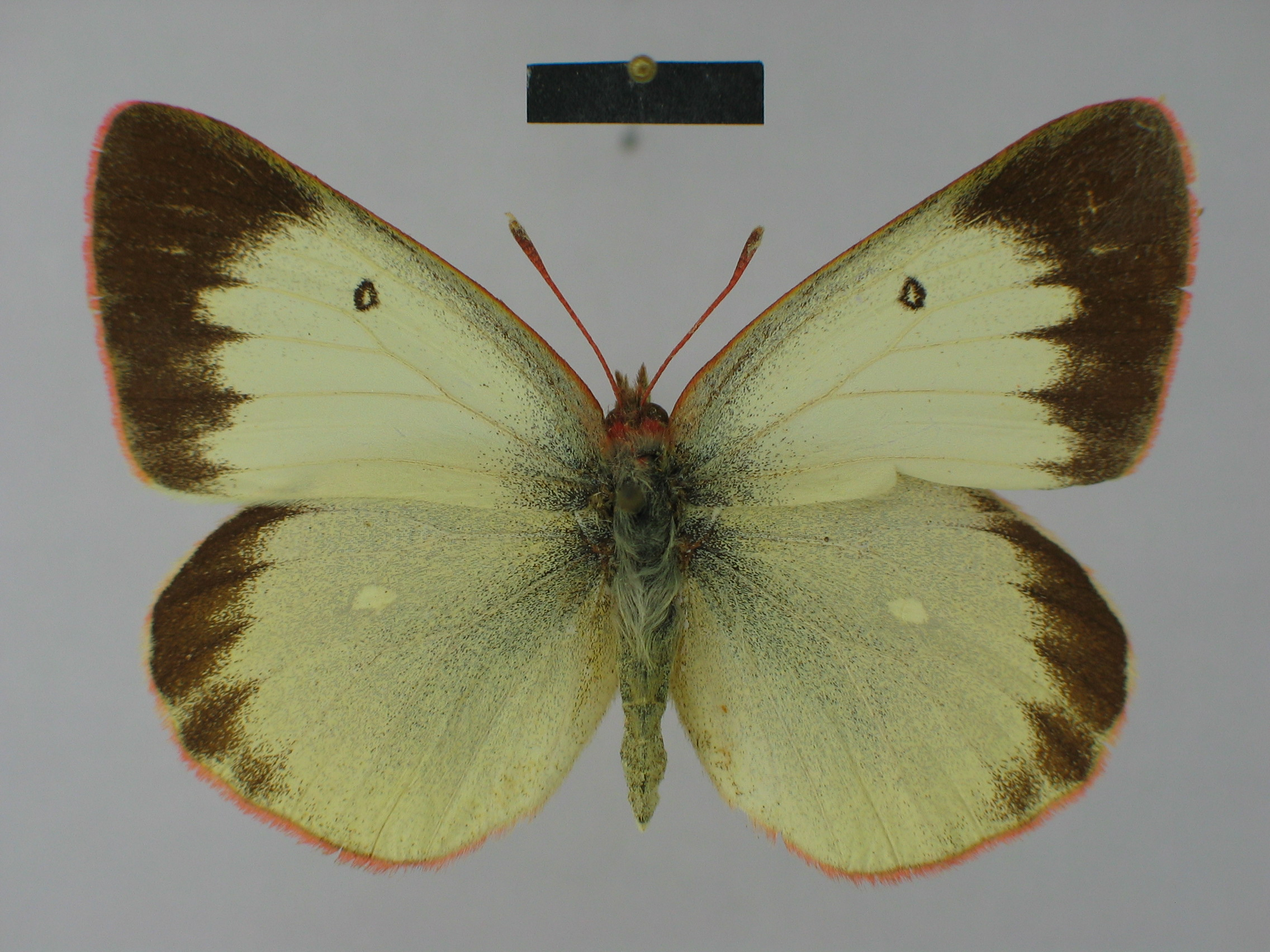
Colias palaeno poktussani Female, dorsal side

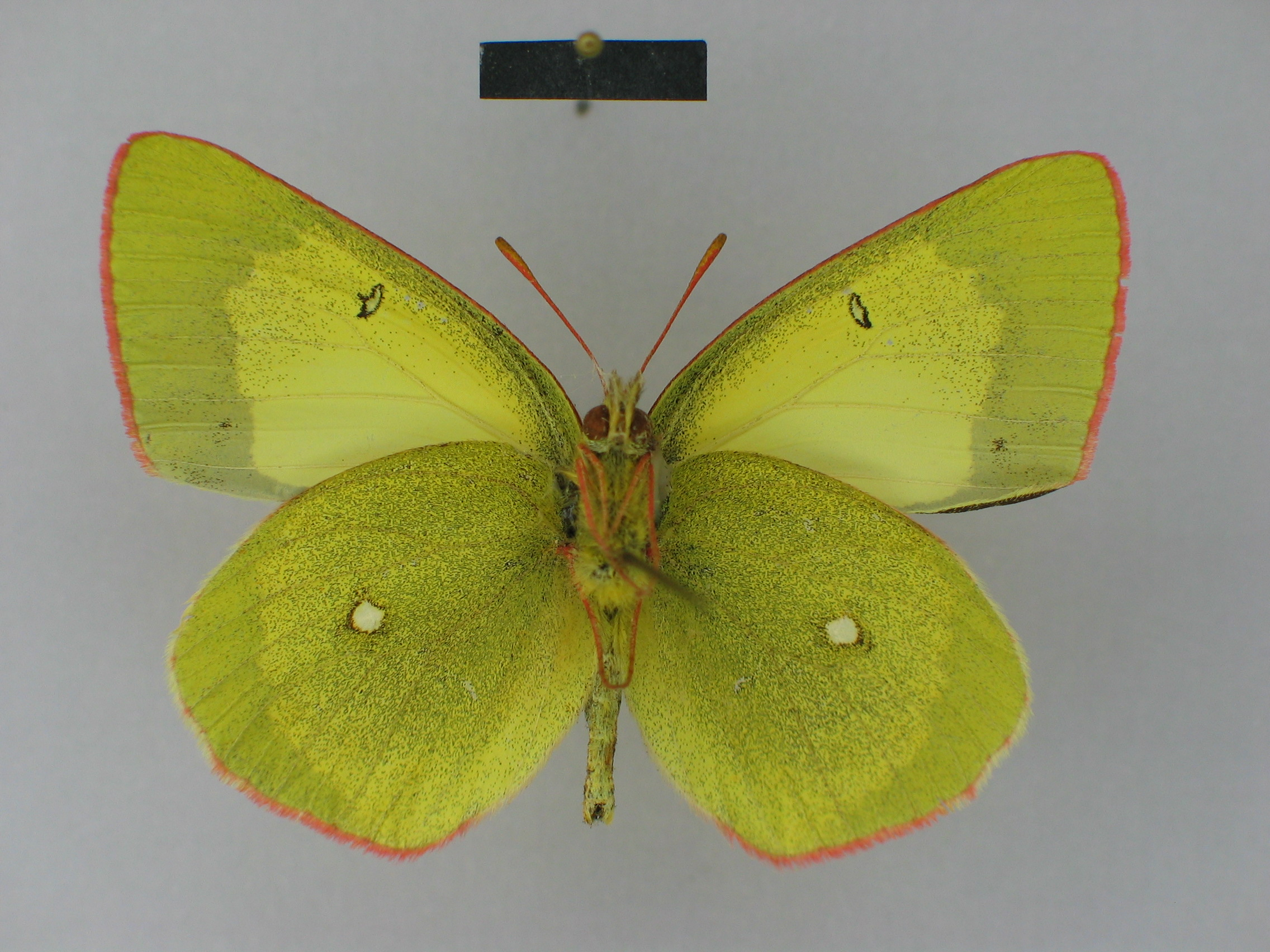
Colias palaeno poktussani Male, ventral side

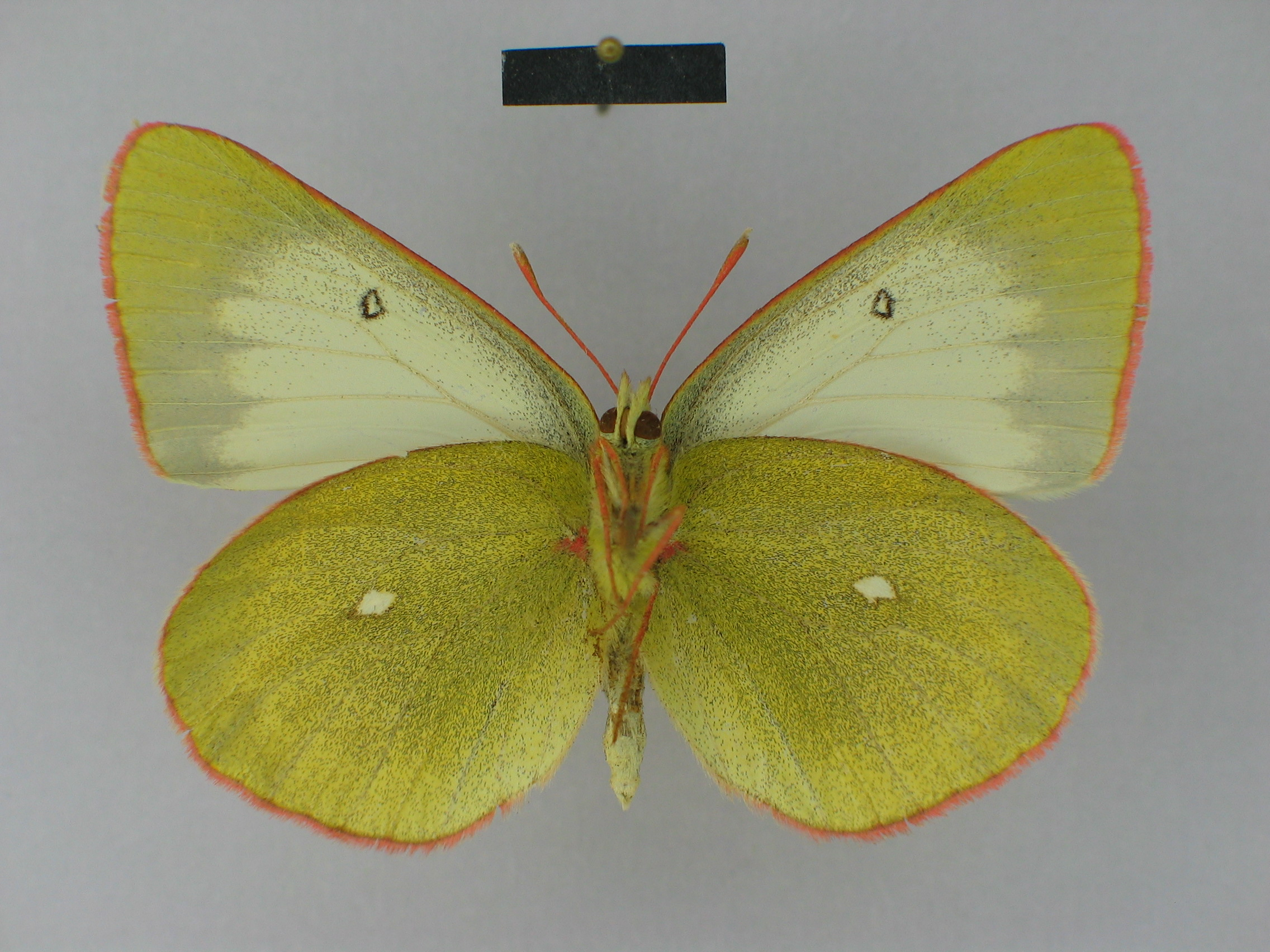
Colias palaeno poktussani Female, ventral side
