= List of butterflies of Italy =

This is a list of butterflies in the country of Italy.

== Hesperiidae – skippers ==
Subfamily Hesperiinae

- Dingy swift, Gegenes nostrodamus (Fabricius, 1793)
- Dark Hottentot, Gegenes pumilio (Hoffmannsegg, 1804)
- Silver-spotted skipper, Hesperia comma (Linnaeus, 1758)
- Large skipper, Ochlodes sylvanuss (Esper 1777)

Subfamily Pyrginae

- Mallow skipper, Carcharodus alceae (Esper, 1780)
- Southern marbled skipper, Carcharodus baeticus (Rambur, 1839)
- Tufted skipper, Carcharodus floccifera (Zeller, 1847)
- Marbled skipper, Carcharodus lavatherae (Esper, 1783)
- Dingy skipper, Erynnis tages (Linnaeus, 1758)
- Sage skipper, Muschampia proto (Ochsenheimer 1808)
- Large grizzled skipper, Pyrgus alveus (Hübner 1803)
- Alpine grizzled skipper, Pyrgus andromedae (Wallengren 1853)
- Oberthür's grizzled skipper, Pyrgus armoricanus (Oberthur 1910)
- Foulquier's grizzled skipper, Pyrgus bellieri bellieri (Oberthur 1910)
  - Pyrgus bellieri picenus (Verity 1920)
- Dusky grizzled skipper, Pyrgus cacaliae (Rambur 1839)
- Carline skipper, Pyrgus carlinae (Rambur 1839)
- Safflower skipper, Pyrgus carthami (Hübner 1813)
- Cinquefoil skipper, Pyrgus cirsii (Rambur 1839)
- Southern grizzled skipper, Pyrgus malvoides (Elwes & Edwards 1897)
- Grizzled skipper, Pyrgus malvae (Linnaeus 1758)
- Rosy grizzled skipper, Pyrgus onopordi (Rambur 1839)
- Olive skipper, Pyrgus serratulae (Rambur 1839)
- Yellow-banded skipper, Pyrgus sidae (Esper 1784)
- Warren's skipper, Pyrgus warrenensis (Verity 1928)
- Lulworth skipper, Thymelicus acteon (Rottemburg 1775)
- Essex skipper, Thymelicus lineola (Ochsenheimer 1808)
- Red-underwing skipper, Thymelicus sylvestris (Poda 1761)

Subfamily Heteropterinae

- Arctic skipper, Carterocephalus palaemon (Pallas, 1771)
- Large chequered skipper, Heteropterus morpheus (Pallas 1771)

== Papilionidae - swallowtails ==
- Scarce swallowtail, Iphiclides podalirius (Linnaeus, 1758)
- Alexanor, Papilio alexanor Esper 1800
- Old World swallowtail, Papilio machaon Linnaeus 1758
- Corsican swallowtail, Papilio hospiton Géné, 1839
- Mountain Apollo, Parnassius apollo (Linnaeus 1758)
- Clouded Apollo, Parnassius mnemosyne (Linnaeus 1758)
- Phoebus Apollo, Parnassius phoebus phoebus (Fabricius 1793)
  - Parnassius phoebus sacerdos Stichel 1906
- Southern festoon, Zerynthia polyxena (Denis & Schiffermüller, 1775)

== Pieridae – whites ==
Subfamily Dismorphiinae

- Wood white, Leptidea sinapis (Linnaeus, 1758)
- Réal's wood white, Leptidea reali Reissinger, 1989

Subfamily Coliadinae

- Berger's clouded yellow, Colias alfacariensis Ribbe, 1805
- Clouded yellow, Colias croceus (Fourcroy, 1785)
- Pale clouded yellow, Colias hyale (Linnaeus, 1758)
- Pale Arctic clouded yellow, Colias palaeno (Linnaeus, 1761)
- Mountain clouded yellow, Colias phicomone (Esper, 1780)

Subfamily Pierinae

- Orange tip, Anthocharis cardamines (Linnaeus 1758)
- Eastern orange tip, Anthocharis damone Boisduval, 1836
- Provence orange tip, Anthocharis euphenoides Staudinger, 1869
- Black-veined white, Aporia crataegi (Linnaeus, 1758)
- Eastern dappled white, Euchloe ausonia (Hübner, 1804)
- Western dappled white, Euchloe crameri Butler, 1869
- Portuguese dappled white, Euchloe tagis (Hübner, 1804)
- Cleopatra, Gonepteryx cleopatra (Linnaeus, 1767)
- Common brimstone, Gonepteryx rhamni (Linnaeus, 1758)
- Large white, Pieris brassicae (Linnaeus, 1758)
- Dark-veined white, Pieris bryoniae (Hübner, 1806)
- Mountain small white, Pieris ergane (Geyer, 1828)
- Southern small white, Pieris mannii (Mayer, 1851)
- Green-veined white, Pieris napi (Linnaeus, 1758)
- Small white, Pieris rapae (Linnaeus, 1758)
- Lofty Bath white, Pontia callidice (Hübner, 1806)
- Bath white, Pontia daplidice (Linnaeus, 1758)
- Eastern Bath white, Pontia edusa (Fabricius, 1777)

== Riodinidae ==
- Duke of Burgundy, Hamearis lucina (Linnaeus, 1758)

== Lycaenidae – blues, coppers and hairstreaks ==
Subfamily Theclinae

- Brown hairstreak, Thecla betulae (Linnaeus, 1758)
- Green hairstreak, Callophrys rubi (Linnaeus 1758)
- Purple hairstreak, Neozephyrus quercus (Linnaeus 1758)
- Sloe hairstreak, Satyrium acaciae (Fabricius, 1787)
- False ilex hairstreak, Satyrium esculi (Hübner, 1804)
- Ilex hairstreak, Satyrium ilicis (Esper, 1779)
- Satyrium pruni, Satyrium pruni (Linnaeus, 1758)
- Blue spot hairstreak, Satyrium spini ([Denis & Schiffermüller], 1775)
- White-letter hairstreak, Satyrium w-album (Knoch, 1782)

Subfamily Lycaeninae

- Purple-shot copper, Lycaena alciphron (Rottemburg 1775)
- Large copper, Lycaena dispar (Haworth 1802)
- Purple-edged copper, Lycaena hippothoe (Linnaeus 1761)
- Small copper, Lycaena phlaeas (Linnaeus 1761)
- Lesser fiery copper, Lycaena thersamon (Esper 1784)
- Sooty copper, Lycaena tityrus (Poda 1761)
- Lycaena subalpina Speyer, 1851
- Scarce copper, Lycaena virgaureae (Linnaeus 1758)

Subfamily Polyommatinae

- Peablue, Lampides boeticus (Linnaeus 1767)
- Lang's short-tailed blue, Leptotes pirithous (Linnaeus 1767)
- Small blue, Cupido (Cupido) minimus (Fuessly 1775)
- Osiris blue, Cupido (Cupido) osiris (Meigen 1829)
- Provençal short-tailed blue, Cupido (Everes) alcetas (Hoffmannsegg 1804)
- Short-tailed blue, Cupido (Everes) argiades (Pallas 1771)
- Holly blue, Celastrina argiolus (Linnaeus 1758)
- Green-underside blue, Glaucopsyche (Glaucopsyche) alexis (Poda 1761)
- Black-eyed blue, Glaucopsyche (Glaucopsyche) melanops (Boisduval 1828)
- Iolas blue, Iolana iolas (Ochsenheimer 1816)
- Alcon blue, Phengaris alcon (Denis & Schiffermüller 1775)
- Large blue, Phengaris arion (Linnaeus 1758)
- Scarce large blue, Phengaris teleius (Bergstrasser 1779)
- Mountain Alcon blue, Phengaris rebeli (Hirsche, 1904)
- Baton blue, Pseudophilotes baton (Bergstrasser 1779)
- Chequered blue, Pseudophilotes vicrama schiffermuelleri (Hemming 1929)
- Pseudophilotes barbagiae De Prins & Poorten, 1982
- Chequered blue butterfly, Scolitantides orion (Pallas 1771)
- Brown argus, Aricia agestis, (Denis & Schiffermüller 1775)
- Northern brown argus, Aricia allous (Geyer, 1837)
- Southern brown argus, Aricia cramera (Eschscholtz, 1821)
- Silvery argus, Aricia nicias Meigen, 1830
- Geranium argus, Eumedonia eumedon (Esper 1780)
- Arctic blue, Agriades glandon (de Prunner 1798)
- Alpine argus, Agriades orbitulus (de Prunner 1798)
- Cranberry blue, Agriades optilete (Knoch 1781)
- Silver-studded blue, Plebejus argus (Linnaeus 1758)
- Reverdin's blue, Plebejus argyrognomon (Bergstrasser 1779)
- Idas blue, Plebejus idas (Linnaeus 1761)
- Alpine zephyr blue, Kretania trappi (Verity 1927)
- Mazarine blue, Cyaniris semiargus (Rottemburg 1775)
- Damon blue, Polyommatus damon (Denis & Schiffermüller 1775)
- Furry blue, Polyommatus (Agrodiaetus) dolus dolus (Hübner 1823)
  - Polyommatus (Agrodiaetus) dolus virgilia (Oberthur 1910)
- Piedmont anomalous blue, Polyommatus (Agrodiaetus) humedasae Toso & Balletto 1976
- Ripart's anomalous blue, Polyommatus (Agrodiaetus) ripartii ripartii (Freyer 1830)
- Meleager's blue, Polyommatus (Meleageria) daphnis (Denis & Schiffermüller 1775)
- Amanda's blue, Polyommatus (Polyommatus) amandus (Schneider 1792)
- Turquoise blue, Polyommatus (Polyommatus) dorylas (Denis & Schiffermüller 1775)
- Eros blue, Polyommatus (Polyommatus) eros eros (Ochsenheimer 1808)
- Escher's blue, Polyommatus (Polyommatus) escheri (Hübner 1823)
- Common blue, Polyommatus (Polyommatus) icarus (Rottemburg 1775)
- Polyommatus (Polyommatus) celina (Austaut, 1879)
- Chapman's blue, Polyommatus (Polyommatus) thersites (Cantener 1835)
- Adonis blue, Lysandra bellargus (Rottemburg 1775)
- Chalkhill blue, Lysandra coridon coridon (Poda 1761)
- Provence chalk hill blue, Lysandra hispana (Herrich-Schäffer 1852)

== Nymphalidae – fritillaries and others ==
Subfamily Nymphalinae

- European peacock, Aglais io (Linnaeus 1758)
- Small tortoiseshell, Aglais urticae (Linnaeus 1758)
- Map butterfly, Araschnia levana (Linnaeus 1758)
- White petticoat, Nymphalis antiopa (Linnaeus 1758)
- Large tortoiseshell, Nymphalis polychloros (Linnaeus 1758)
- Comma, Polygonia c-album (Linnaeus 1758)
- Southern comma, Polygonia egea (Cramer 1775)
- Red admiral, Vanessa atalanta (Linnaeus 1758)
- Painted lady, Vanessa cardui (Linnaeus 1758)
- Cynthia's fritillary, Euphydryas cynthia (Denis & Schiffermüller 1775)
- Scarce fritillary, Euphydryas maturna (Linnaeus, 1758)
- Marsh fritillary, Euphydryas aurinia (Rottemburg, 1775)
- Asian fritillary, Euphydryas intermedia (Ménétriés, 1859)
- Aetherie fritillary, Melitaea aetherie (Hübner, 1826)
- Little fritillary, Melitaea asteria (Freyer, 1828)
- Heath fritillary, Melitaea athalia (Rottemburg, 1775)
- Nickerl's fritillary, Melitaea aurelia Nickerl, 1850
- Assman's fritillary, Melitaea britomartis (Assmann, 1847)
- Glanville fritillary, Melitaea cinxia (Linnaeus, 1758)
- Provençal fritillary, Melitaea deione (Geyer, 1832)
- False heath fritillary, Melitaea diamina (Lang, 1789)
- Spotted fritillary, Melitaea didyma (Esper, 1778)
- Melitaea nevadensis Oberthür, 1904
- Meadow fritillary, Melitaea parthenoides Keferstein 1851
- Knapweed fritillary, Melitaea phoebe (Denis & Schiffermüller 1775)
- Jerusalem fritillary, Melitaea telona (Fruhstorfer 1908)
- Lesser spotted fritillary, Melitaea trivia (Denis & Schiffermüller 1775)
- Grisons fritillary, Melitaea varia Meyer-Dur 1851

Subfamily Heliconiinae

- Silver-washed fritillary, Argynnis paphia (Linnaeus 1758)
- Cardinal, Argynnis pandora (Denis & Schiffermüller 1775)
- High brown fritillary, Fabriciana adippe (Denis & Schiffermüller 1775)
- Niobe fritillary, Fabriciana niobe (Linnaeus 1758)
- Dark green fritillary, Speyeria aglaja (Linnaeus 1758)
- Balkan fritillary, Boloria (Boloria) graeca (Staudinger 1870)
- Mountain fritillary, Boloria (Boloria) napaea (Hoffmannsegg 1804)
- Shepherd's fritillary, Boloria (Boloria) pales (Denis & Schiffermüller 1775)
- Violet fritillary, Boloria (Clossiana) dia (Linnaeus 1767)
- Pearl-bordered fritillary, Boloria (Clossiana) euphrosyne (Linnaeus 1758)
- Small pearl-bordered fritillary, Boloria (Clossiana) selene (Denis & Schiffermüller 1775)
- Thor's fritillary, Boloria (Clossiana) thore (Hübner 1803)
- Purple bog fritillary, Boloria (Clossiana) titania (Esper 1793)
- Ocellate bog fritillary, Boloria (Proclossiana) eunomia (Esper 1799)
- Marbled fritillary, Brenthis daphne (Bergstrasser 1780)
- Twin-spot fritillary, Brenthis hecate (Denis & Schiffermüller 1775)
- Lesser marbled fritillary, Brenthis ino (Rottemburg 1775)
- Queen of Spain, Issoria lathonia (Linnaeus 1758)

Subfamily Charaxinae

- Two-tailed pasha, Charaxes jasius (Linnaeus 1767)

Subfamily Danainae

- Plain tiger, Danaus (Anosia) chrysippus (Linnaeus 1758)

Subfamily Apaturinae

- Lesser purple emperor, Apatura ilia (Denis & Schiffermüller 1775)
- Purple emperor, Apatura iris (Linnaeus, 1758)

Subfamily Libytheinae

- Nettle-tree butterfly, Libythea celtis (Laicharting 1782)

Subfamily Limenitidinae

- (Eurasian) white admiral, Limenitis camilla (Linnaeus 1764)
- Poplar admiral, Limenitis populi (Linnaeus 1758)
- Southern white admiral, Limenitis reducta Staudinger 1901
- Hungarian glider, Neptis rivularis (Scopoli 1763)
- Pallas' sailer, Neptis sappho (Pallas 1771)

Subfamily Satyrinae

- Woodland grayling, Hipparchia (Hipparchia) fagi (Scopoli 1763)
- Rock grayling, Hipparchia (Hipparchia) hermione hermione (Linnaeus 1764)
- Hipparchia (Hipparchia) neomiris (Godart 1822)
- Tree grayling, Hipparchia (Neohipparchia) statilinus (Hufnagel 1766)
- Hipparchia (Parahipparchia) neapolitana (Stauder 1921)
- Hipparchia (Parahipparchia) sbordonii Kudrna 1984
- Grayling, Hipparchia (Parahipparchia) semele (Linnaeus 1758)
- Striped grayling, Hipparchia (Pseudotergumia) fidia (Linnaeus 1767)
- Oriental meadow brown, Hyponephele lupinus (O. Costa 1836)
- Dusky meadow brown, Hyponephele lycaon (Rottemburg 1775)
- Large wall, Lasiommata maera (Linnaeus 1758)
- Wall, Lasiommata megera (Linnaeus 1767)
- Northern wall brown, Lasiommata petropolitana (Fabricius 1787)
- Woodland brown, Lopinga achine (Scopoli 1763)
- Meadow brown, Maniola jurtina (Linnaeus 1758)
- Marbled white, Melanargia galathea (Linnaeus 1758)
- Western marbled white, Melanargia occitanica (Esper 1793)
- Esper's marbled white, Melanargia russiae (Esper 1783)
- Italian marbled white, Melanargia arge (Sulzer 1776)
- Dryad, Minois dryas (Scopoli 1763)
- Ringlet, Aphantopus hyperantus (Linnaeus 1758)
- False grayling, Arethusana arethusa (Denis & Schiffermüller 1775)
- Great banded grayling, Brintesia circe (Fabricius 1775)
- Alpine grayling, Oeneis (Oeneis) glacialis (Moll 1783)
- Hermit, Chazara briseis (Linnaeus 1764)
- Pearly heath, Coenonympha arcania (Linnaeus 1761)
- Corsican heath, Coenonympha corinna (Hübner 1804)
  - Coenonympha corinna elbana Staudinger 1901
- Dusky heath, Coenonympha dorus (Esper 1782)
- Alpine heath, Coenonympha gardetta gardetta (de Prunner 1798)
  - Coenonympha gardetta darwiniana Staudinger 1871
- Chestnut heath, Coenonympha glycerion Borkhausen 1788)
- False ringlet, Coenonympha oedippus (Fabricius 1787)
- Small heath, Coenonympha pamphilus (Linnaeus 1758)
- Eastern large heath, Coenonympha rhodopensis Elwes 1900
- Large heath, Coenonympha tullia (Muller 1764)
- False Mnestra ringlet, Erebia aethiopellus (Hoffmannsegg 1806)
- Scotch argus, Erebia aethiops (Esper 1777)
- Almond-eyed ringlet, Erebia alberganus (de Prunner 1798)
- Lorkovic's brassy ringlet, Erebia calcaria Lorkovic 1953
- Common brassy ringlet, Erebia cassioides cassioides (Reiner & Hochenwarth 1792)
- Raetzer's ringlet, Erebia christi Ratzer 1890
- Small mountain ringlet, Erebia epiphron (Knoch 1783)
- Eriphyle ringlet, Erebia eriphyle (Freyer 1836)
- Large ringlet, Erebia euryale (Esper 1805)
- Yellow-banded ringlet, Erebia flavofasciata Heyne 1895
- Silky ringlet, Erebia gorge (Hübner 1804)
- Arran brown, Erebia ligea (Linnaeus 1758)
- Yellow-spotted ringlet, Erebia manto (Denis & Schiffermüller 1775)
- Woodland ringlet, Erebia medusa (Denis & Schiffermüller 1775)
- Lesser mountain ringlet, Erebia melampus (Fuessly 1775)
- Piedmont ringlet, Erebia meolans (Prunner 1798)
- Mnestra's ringlet, Erebia mnestra (Hübner 1804)
- Marbled ringlet, Erebia montanus (de Prunner 1798)
- Autumn ringlet, Erebia neoridas (Boisduval 1828)
- de Lesse's brassy ringlet, Erebia nivalis Lorkovic & De Lesse 1954
- Bright eyed ringlet, Erebia oeme (Hübner 1804)
- Ottoman brassy ringlet, Erebia ottomana Herrich-Schäffer 1847
- Dewy ringlet, Erebia pandrose (Borkhausen 1788)
- Blind ringlet, Erebia pharte (Hübner 1804)
- Sooty ringlet, Erebia pluto (de Prunner 1798)
- Water ringlet, Erebia pronoe (Esper 1780)
- Larche ringlet, Erebia scipio Boisduval 1832
- Styrian ringlet, Erebia stirius (Godart 1824)
- Stygian ringlet, Erebia styx (Freyer 1834)
- de Prunner's ringlet, Erebia triarius (de Prunner 1798)
- Swiss brassy ringlet, Erebia tyndarus (Esper 1781)
- Speckled wood, Pararge aegeria (Linnaeus 1758)
- Southern gatekeeper, Pyronia (Idata) cecilia (Vallantin 1894)
- Gatekeeper, Pyronia (Pyronia) tithonus (Linnaeus 1767)
- Black satyr, Satyrus actaea (Esper 1781)
- Great sooty satyr, Satyrus ferula (Fabricius 1793)
