= List of butterflies of Austria =

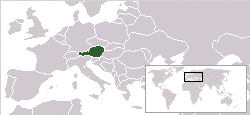
Location of Austria

This list of butterflies of Austria is part of the List of Lepidoptera of Austria.

== Butterflies ==
=== Hesperiidae ===
- Carcharodus alceae (Esper, 1780)
- Carcharodus floccifera (Zeller, 1847)
- Carcharodus lavatherae (Esper, 1783)
- Carterocephalus palaemon (Pallas, 1771)
- Erynnis tages (Linnaeus, 1758)
- Hesperia comma (Linnaeus, 1758)
- Heteropterus morpheus (Pallas, 1771)
- Ochlodes sylvanus (Esper, 1777)
- Pyrgus alveus (Hübner, 1803)
- Pyrgus andromedae (Wallengren, 1853)
- Pyrgus armoricanus (Oberthur, 1910)
- Pyrgus cacaliae (Rambur, 1839)
- Pyrgus carlinae (Rambur, 1839)
- Pyrgus carthami (Hübner, 1813)
- Pyrgus cirsii (Rambur, 1839)
- Pyrgus malvae (Linnaeus, 1758)
- Pyrgus malvoides (Elwes & Edwards, 1897)
- Pyrgus onopordi (Rambur, 1839)
- Pyrgus serratulae (Rambur, 1839)
- Pyrgus warrenensis (Verity, 1928)
- Spialia sertorius (Hoffmannsegg, 1804)
- Thymelicus acteon (Rottemburg, 1775)
- Thymelicus lineola (Ochsenheimer, 1808)
- Thymelicus sylvestris (Poda, 1761)

=== Lycaenidae ===
- Agriades glandon (de Prunner, 1798)
- Agriades optilete (Knoch, 1781)
- Agriades orbitulus (de Prunner, 1798)
- Aricia agestis (Denis & Schiffermuller, 1775)
- Aricia artaxerxes (Fabricius, 1793)
- Callophrys rubi (Linnaeus, 1758)
- Celastrina argiolus (Linnaeus, 1758)
- Cupido minimus (Fuessly, 1775)
- Cupido osiris (Meigen, 1829)
- Cupido argiades (Pallas, 1771)
- Cupido decolorata (Staudinger, 1886)
- Cyaniris semiargus (Rottemburg, 1775)
- Eumedonia eumedon (Esper, 1780)
- Favonius quercus (Linnaeus, 1758)
- Glaucopsyche alexis (Poda, 1761)
- Lampides boeticus (Linnaeus, 1767)
- Leptotes pirithous (Linnaeus, 1767)
- Lycaena alciphron (Rottemburg, 1775)
- Lycaena dispar (Haworth, 1802)
- Lycaena helle (Denis & Schiffermuller, 1775)
- Lycaena hippothoe (Linnaeus, 1761)
- Lycaena phlaeas (Linnaeus, 1761)
- Lycaena thersamon (Esper, 1784)
- Lycaena tityrus (Poda, 1761)
- Lycaena virgaureae (Linnaeus, 1758)
- Lysandra bellargus (Rottemburg, 1775)
- Lysandra coridon (Poda, 1761)
- Phengaris alcon (Denis & Schiffermuller, 1775)
- Phengaris arion (Linnaeus, 1758)
- Phengaris nausithous (Bergstrasser, 1779)
- Phengaris teleius (Bergstrasser, 1779)
- Plebejus argus (Linnaeus, 1758)
- Plebejus argyrognomon (Bergstrasser, 1779)
- Plebejus idas (Linnaeus, 1761)
- Polyommatus admetus (Esper, 1783)
- Polyommatus damon (Denis & Schiffermuller, 1775)
- Polyommatus daphnis (Denis & Schiffermuller, 1775)
- Polyommatus amandus (Schneider, 1792)
- Polyommatus dorylas (Denis & Schiffermuller, 1775)
- Polyommatus eros (Ochsenheimer, 1808)
- Polyommatus icarus (Rottemburg, 1775)
- Polyommatus thersites (Cantener, 1835)
- Pseudophilotes baton (Bergstrasser, 1779)
- Pseudophilotes vicrama (Moore, 1865)
- Satyrium acaciae (Fabricius, 1787)
- Satyrium ilicis (Esper, 1779)
- Satyrium pruni (Linnaeus, 1758)
- Satyrium spini (Denis & Schiffermuller, 1775)
- Satyrium w-album (Knoch, 1782)
- Scolitantides orion (Pallas, 1771)
- Thecla betulae (Linnaeus, 1758)

=== Nymphalidae ===
- Aglais io (Linnaeus, 1758)
- Aglais urticae (Linnaeus, 1758)
- Apatura ilia (Denis & Schiffermuller, 1775)
- Apatura iris (Linnaeus, 1758)
- Apatura metis Freyer, 1829
- Aphantopus hyperantus (Linnaeus, 1758)
- Araschnia levana (Linnaeus, 1758)
- Arethusana arethusa (Denis & Schiffermuller, 1775)
- Argynnis paphia (Linnaeus, 1758)
- Argynnis pandora (Denis & Schiffermuller, 1775)
- Boloria aquilonaris (Stichel, 1908)
- Boloria napaea (Hoffmannsegg, 1804)
- Boloria pales (Denis & Schiffermuller, 1775)
- Boloria dia (Linnaeus, 1767)
- Boloria euphrosyne (Linnaeus, 1758)
- Boloria selene (Denis & Schiffermuller, 1775)
- Boloria thore (Hübner, 1803)
- Boloria titania (Esper, 1793)
- Boloria eunomia (Esper, 1799)
- Brenthis daphne (Bergstrasser, 1780)
- Brenthis hecate (Denis & Schiffermuller, 1775)
- Brenthis ino (Rottemburg, 1775)
- Brintesia circe (Fabricius, 1775)
- Chazara briseis (Linnaeus, 1764)
- Coenonympha arcania (Linnaeus, 1761)
- Coenonympha gardetta (de Prunner, 1798)
- Coenonympha glycerion (Borkhausen, 1788)
- Coenonympha hero (Linnaeus, 1761)
- Coenonympha oedippus (Fabricius, 1787)
- Coenonympha pamphilus (Linnaeus, 1758)
- Coenonympha tullia (Muller, 1764)
- Erebia aethiops (Esper, 1777)
- Erebia alberganus (de Prunner, 1798)
- Erebia calcaria Lorkovic, 1953
- Erebia cassioides (Reiner & Hochenwarth, 1792)
- Erebia claudina (Borkhausen, 1789)
- Erebia epiphron (Knoch, 1783)
- Erebia eriphyle (Freyer, 1836)
- Erebia euryale (Esper, 1805)
- Erebia flavofasciata Heyne, 1895
- Erebia gorge (Hübner, 1804)
- Erebia ligea (Linnaeus, 1758)
- Erebia manto (Denis & Schiffermuller, 1775)
- Erebia medusa (Denis & Schiffermuller, 1775)
- Erebia melampus (Fuessly, 1775)
- Erebia meolans (Prunner, 1798)
- Erebia mnestra (Hübner, 1804)
- Erebia montanus (de Prunner, 1798)
- Erebia nivalis Lorkovic & De Lesse, 1954
- Erebia oeme (Hübner, 1804)
- Erebia pandrose (Borkhausen, 1788)
- Erebia pharte (Hübner, 1804)
- Erebia pluto (de Prunner, 1798)
- Erebia pronoe (Esper, 1780)
- Erebia stirius (Godart, 1824)
- Erebia styx (Freyer, 1834)
- Erebia tyndarus (Esper, 1781)
- Euphydryas aurinia (Rottemburg, 1775)
- Euphydryas cynthia (Denis & Schiffermuller, 1775)
- Euphydryas intermedia (Menetries, 1859)
- Euphydryas maturna (Linnaeus, 1758)
- Fabriciana adippe (Denis & Schiffermuller, 1775)
- Fabriciana niobe (Linnaeus, 1758)
- Hipparchia fagi (Scopoli, 1763)
- Hipparchia hermione (Linnaeus, 1764)
- Hipparchia statilinus (Hufnagel, 1766)
- Hipparchia semele (Linnaeus, 1758)
- Hyponephele lycaon (Rottemburg, 1775)
- Issoria lathonia (Linnaeus, 1758)
- Lasiommata maera (Linnaeus, 1758)
- Lasiommata megera (Linnaeus, 1767)
- Lasiommata petropolitana (Fabricius, 1787)
- Libythea celtis (Laicharting, 1782)
- Limenitis camilla (Linnaeus, 1764)
- Limenitis populi (Linnaeus, 1758)
- Limenitis reducta Staudinger, 1901
- Lopinga achine (Scopoli, 1763)
- Maniola jurtina (Linnaeus, 1758)
- Melanargia galathea (Linnaeus, 1758)
- Melitaea asteria Freyer, 1828
- Melitaea athalia (Rottemburg, 1775)
- Melitaea aurelia Nickerl, 1850
- Melitaea britomartis Assmann, 1847
- Melitaea cinxia (Linnaeus, 1758)
- Melitaea diamina (Lang, 1789)
- Melitaea didyma (Esper, 1778)
- Melitaea parthenoides Keferstein, 1851
- Melitaea phoebe (Denis & Schiffermuller, 1775)
- Melitaea trivia (Denis & Schiffermuller, 1775)
- Melitaea varia Meyer-Dur, 1851
- Minois dryas (Scopoli, 1763)
- Neptis rivularis (Scopoli, 1763)
- Neptis sappho (Pallas, 1771)
- Nymphalis antiopa (Linnaeus, 1758)
- Nymphalis polychloros (Linnaeus, 1758)
- Nymphalis vaualbum (Denis & Schiffermuller, 1775)
- Nymphalis xanthomelas (Esper, 1781)
- Oeneis glacialis (Moll, 1783)
- Pararge aegeria (Linnaeus, 1758)
- Polygonia c-album (Linnaeus, 1758)
- Satyrus ferula (Fabricius, 1793)
- Speyeria aglaja (Linnaeus, 1758)
- Vanessa atalanta (Linnaeus, 1758)
- Vanessa cardui (Linnaeus, 1758)

=== Papilionidae ===
- Iphiclides podalirius (Linnaeus, 1758)
- Papilio machaon Linnaeus, 1758
- Parnassius apollo (Linnaeus, 1758)
- Parnassius mnemosyne (Linnaeus, 1758)
- Parnassius phoebus (Fabricius, 1793)
- Zerynthia polyxena (Denis & Schiffermuller, 1775)

=== Pieridae ===
- Anthocharis cardamines (Linnaeus, 1758)
- Aporia crataegi (Linnaeus, 1758)
- Colias alfacariensis Ribbe, 1905
- Colias chrysotheme (Esper, 1781)
- Colias croceus (Fourcroy, 1785)
- Colias erate (Esper, 1805)
- Colias hyale (Linnaeus, 1758)
- Colias myrmidone (Esper, 1781)
- Colias palaeno (Linnaeus, 1761)
- Colias phicomone (Esper, 1780)
- Gonepteryx rhamni (Linnaeus, 1758)
- Leptidea morsei (Fenton, 1882)
- Leptidea sinapis (Linnaeus, 1758)
- Pieris brassicae (Linnaeus, 1758)
- Pieris bryoniae (Hübner, 1806)
- Pieris ergane (Geyer, 1828)
- Pieris mannii (Mayer, 1851)
- Pieris napi (Linnaeus, 1758)
- Pieris rapae (Linnaeus, 1758)
- Pontia callidice (Hübner, 1800)
- Pontia edusa (Fabricius, 1777)

=== Riodinidae ===
- Hamearis lucina (Linnaeus, 1758)
