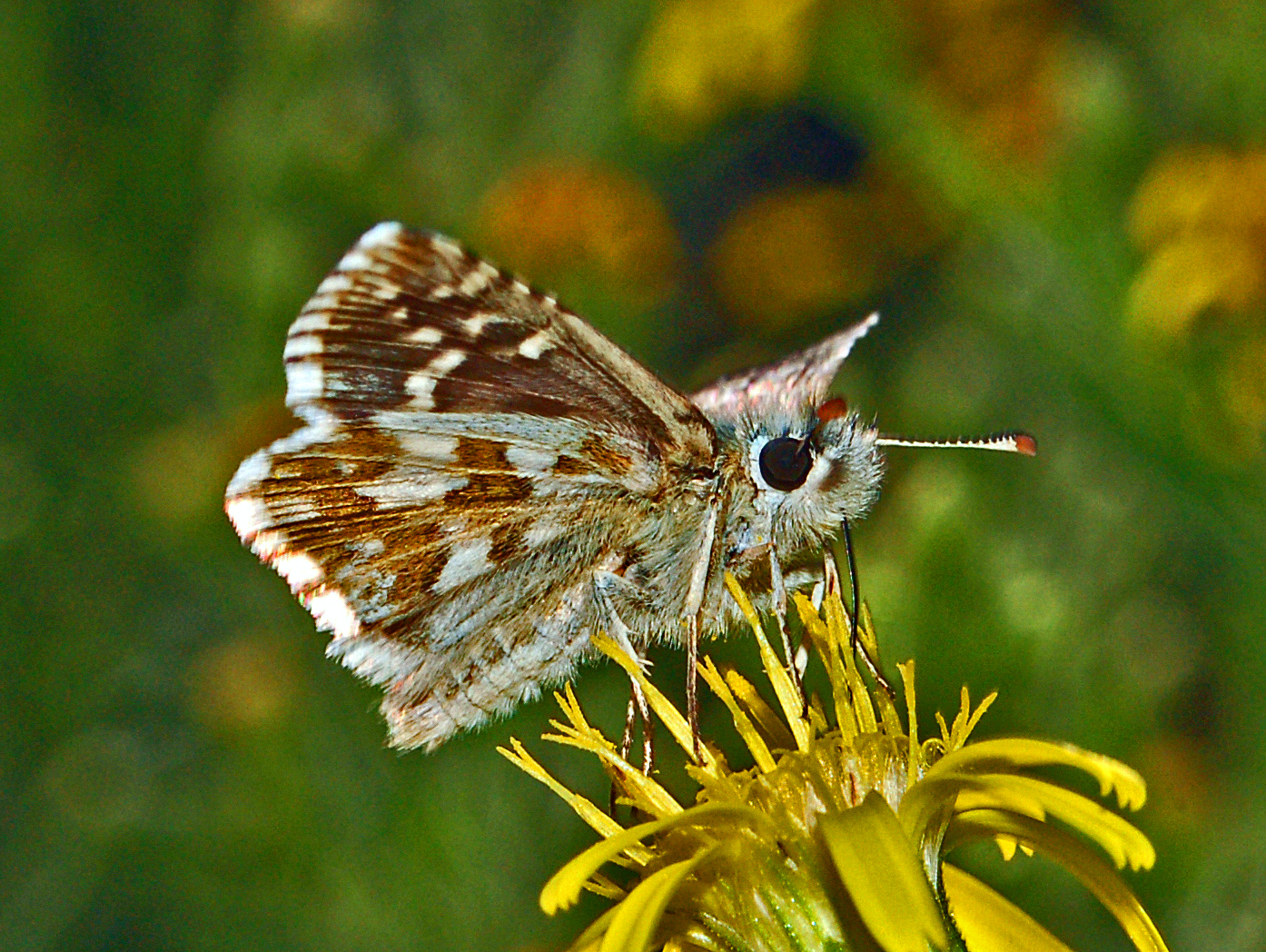
- Pyrgus onopordi. Side view
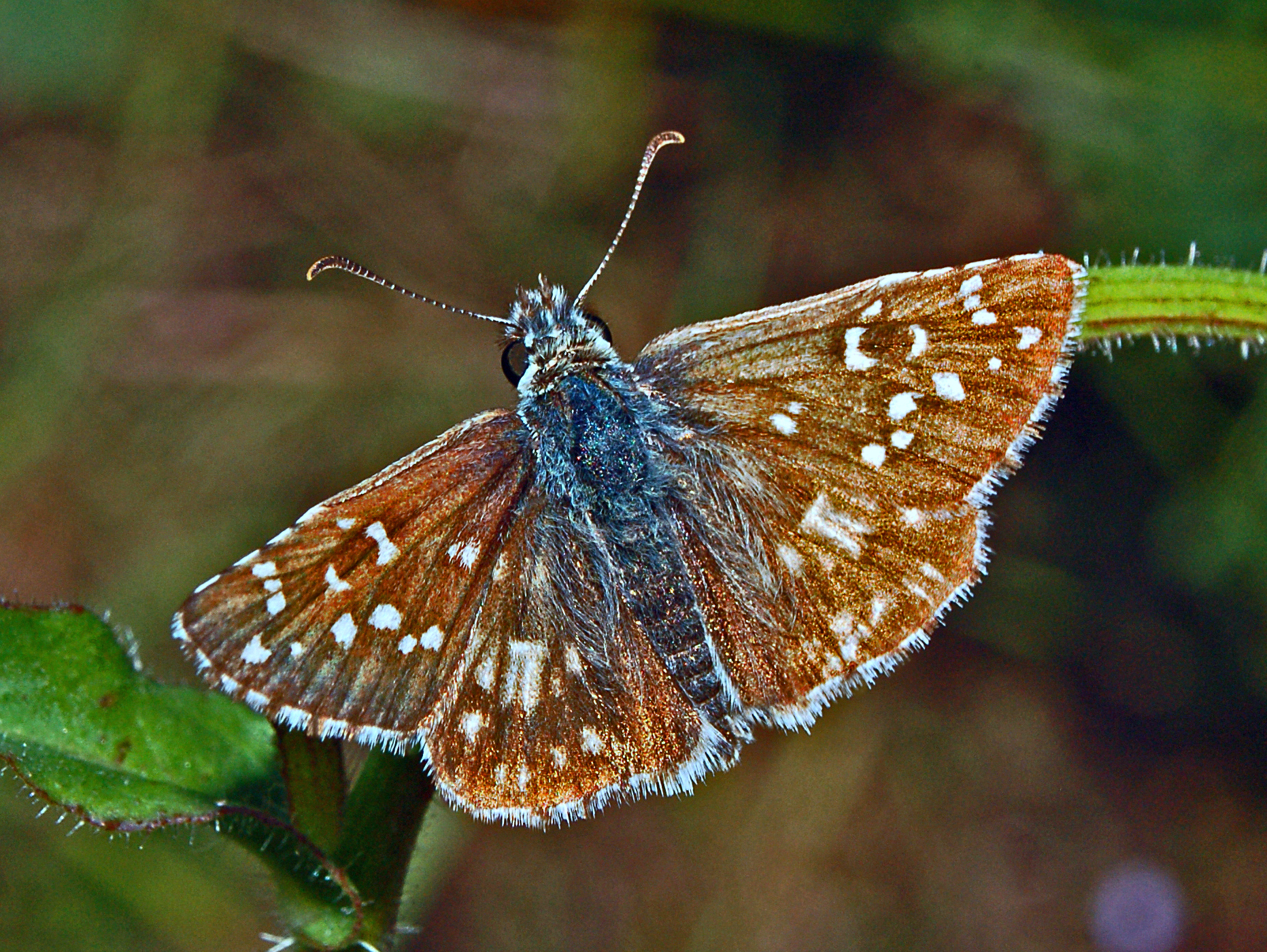
- Dorsal view

Scientific classification
- Kingdom: Animalia
- Phylum: Arthropoda
- Class: Insecta
- Order: Lepidoptera
- Family: Hesperiidae
- Genus: Pyrgus
- Species: P. onopordi

Binomial name
- Pyrgus onopordi (Rambur, 1839)

= Rosy grizzled skipper =

Pyrgus onopordi

Species of skipper butterfly genus Pyrgus

The rosy grizzled skipper (Pyrgus onopordi) is a species of skipper (family Hesperiidae).

== Distribution and habitat ==
This species can be found in central and southern Europe (Austria, Croatia, France, Germany, Italy, Portugal, Slovenia, Spain, Switzerland, and Netherlands) and in North Africa (Algeria and Morocco).

These butterflies inhabit flowery meadows, hot dry grassy meadows and streams at an elevation of 0–2,000 metres (0–6,562 ft) above sea level.

== Description ==
The wingspan of Pyrgus onopordi can reach 22–28 mm. The upper side of the frontwings and hindwings is dark brown or khaki with a slight yellowish tinge, white markings, and a white fringe on the edge. The underside hindwings is light yellow-brown marbled with a few large white spots, including a characteristic anvil-shaped discal mark bordered with dark lines in the cells four and five. Females are darker and usually larger than males. Unlike most European Pyrgus species this skipper can usually be readily identified in the field as it is noticeably paler than its congeners. This is due to a heavy dusting of yellowish scales which overlies the dark brown base colour.

The eggs are yellowish, roundish, and flattened at both ends, with up to twenty strong longitudinal ribs on the surface. The caterpillars range from light to dark brown with bright sideline lines. The head is black. The pupae are bluish-tinted with a very contrasting drawing.

This species is quite similar to Pyrgus carlinae, Pyrgus cirsii, Pyrgus cinarae, Pyrgus malvae, Pyrgus alveus, Pyrgus andromedae, Pyrgus cacaliae, and Spialia sertorius.

== Biology ==
Two or three generations are produced each year at any time between April and October. The larval food plants are Potentilla species (Potentilla reptans, Potentilla pusilla, Potentilla hirta), Malva neglecta, Malva parviflora, Malope malacoides, and Helianthemum species (Helianthemum apenninum, Helianthemum hirtum).

== Bibliography ==
- Whalley, Paul (1981). The Mitchell Beazley Guide to Butterflies. London: Mitchell Beazley. ISBN 0-85533-348-0.
- Sonderegger, P. (1997): Pyrgus onopordi. — In: Pro Natura – Schweizerischer Bund für Naturschutz (Hrsg.) (1997): Schmetterlinge und ihre Lebensräume. Arten, Gefährdung, Schutz. Schweiz und angrenzende Gebiete. Band 2: 153-155.
- Wafner, W. (2009): Zur Freiland-Raupennahrung von Pyrgus onopordi (Rambur 1839) in Andalusien (Lepidoptera: Hesperiidae). — Nachrichten des Entomologischen Vereins Apollo, 30 (1/2): 1–4.
- Tom Tolman et Richard Lewington, Guide des papillons d'Europe et d'Afrique du Nord, Delachaux et Niestlé, 1997 (ISBN 978-2-603-01649-7)
