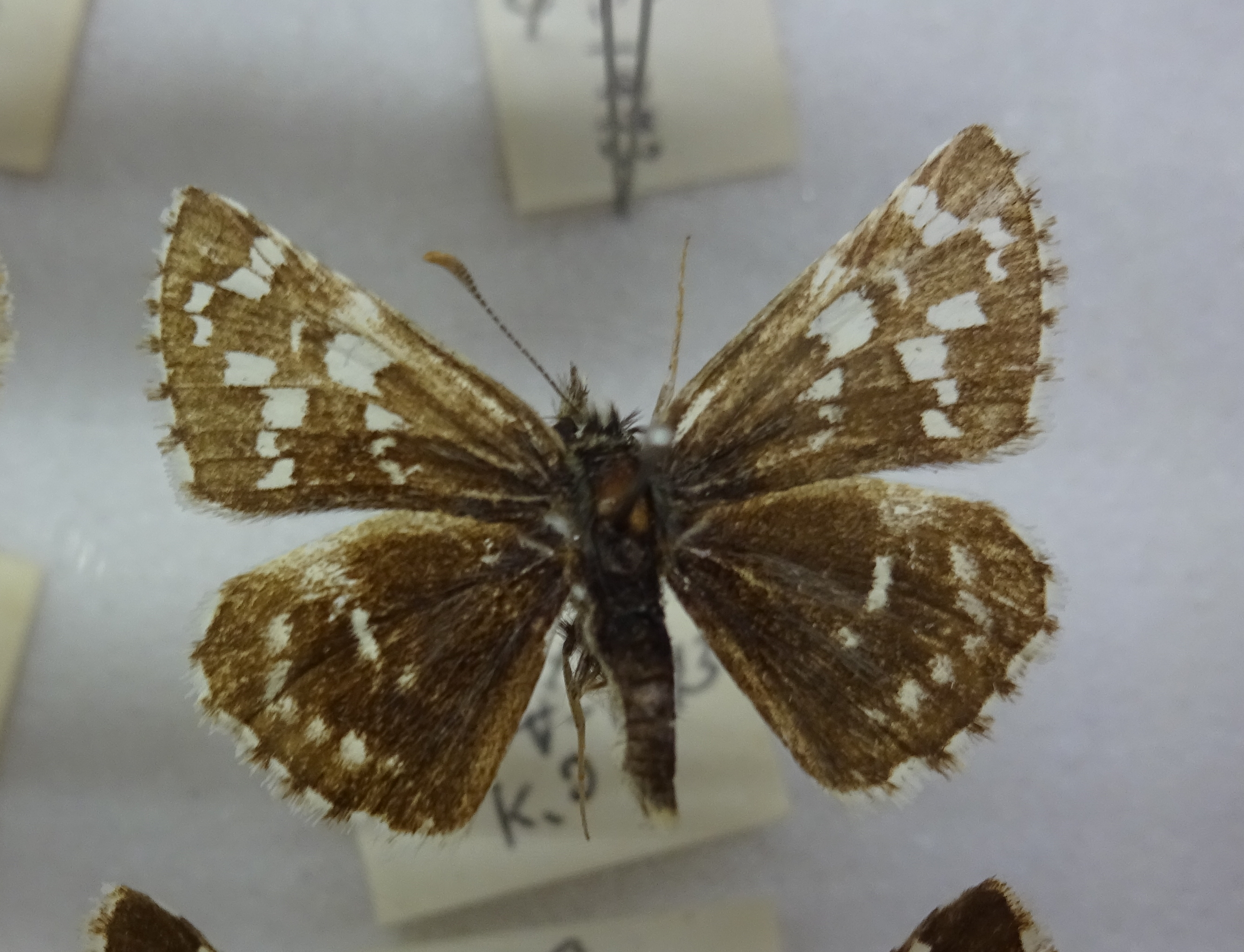

Scientific classification
- Kingdom: Animalia
- Phylum: Arthropoda
- Class: Insecta
- Order: Lepidoptera
- Family: Hesperiidae
- Genus: Pyrgus
- Species: P. maculatus

Binomial name
- Pyrgus maculatus (Bremer & Grey, 1853)

Synonyms
- Syrichthus maculatus Bremer & Grey, 1853; Scelothrix zona Mabille, 1875; Scelothrix albistriga Mabille, 1876; Pyrgus sinicus Butler, 1877; Syrichthus bocki Oberthür, 1912; Syrichthus thibetanus Oberthür, 1891

= Pyrgus maculatus =

Species of skipper butterfly genus Pyrgus

Pyrgus maculatus is an eastern Palearctic butterfly in the family Hesperiidae and subfamily Pyrginae. The species was first described by Otto Vasilievich Bremer and William Grey in 1853. It is found in South Siberia (Altai to Ussuri) and Japan. The larva feeds on Spiraea species (including Spiraea ussuriensis and Spiraea media) and Potentilla freyniana.

== Subspecies ==
- P. m. maculatus
- P. m. bocki (Oberthür, 1912)
- P. m. thibetanus (Oberthür, 1891) (west China)
