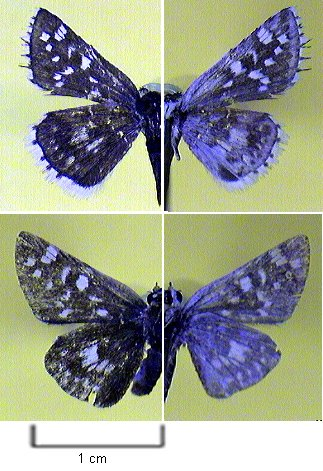

Scientific classification
- Domain: Eukaryota
- Kingdom: Animalia
- Phylum: Arthropoda
- Class: Insecta
- Order: Lepidoptera
- Family: Hesperiidae
- Genus: Pyrgus
- Species: P. scriptura

Binomial name
- Pyrgus scriptura (Boisduval, 1852)

Synonyms
- Syrichtus scriptura Boisduval, 1852; Hesperia scriptura Dyar, 1903

= Pyrgus scriptura =

Small checkered skipper

Species of skipper butterfly genus Pyrgus

Pyrgus scriptura, the small checkered skipper, is a species of skipper (family Hesperiidae). It is found from the Texas to Montana, southeastern Alberta, and southwestern Saskatchewan.

The wingspan is 16–22 mm. There are two generations from May to August.

The larva feed Malvaceae spp. and Sida hederacea.

== Subspecies ==
- Pyrgus scriptura scriptura
- Pyrgus scriptur apertorum Austin, 1998
