= Pyrgus sibirica =

Scientific classification
- Kingdom: Animalia
- Phylum: Arthropoda
- Class: Insecta
- Order: Lepidoptera
- Family: Hesperiidae
- Genus: Pyrgus
- Species: P. sibirica

Binomial name
- Pyrgus sibirica Reverdin, 1911

Synonyms
- Hesperia chapmani Warren, 1926

Species of insect

Pyrgus sibirica is a diurnal species of Lepidoptera found in tundra environments. It was first described by naturalist Jaques-Louis Reverdin in 1911.
