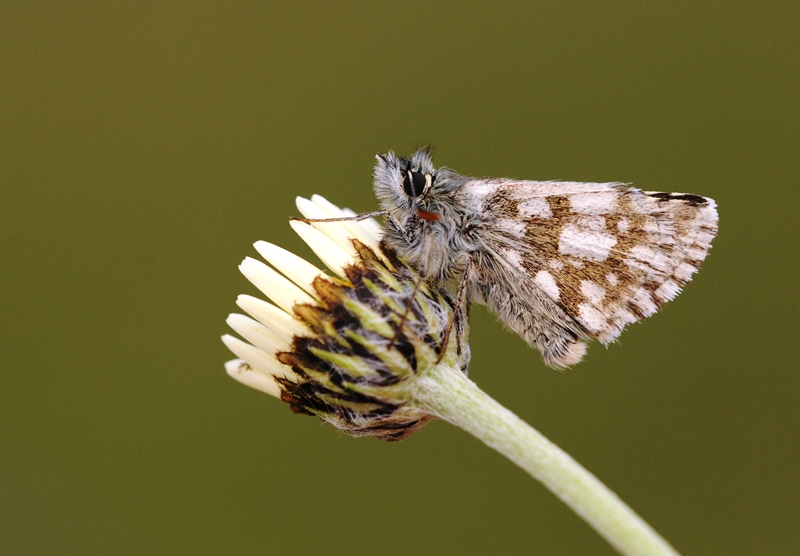

Scientific classification
- Domain: Eukaryota
- Kingdom: Animalia
- Phylum: Arthropoda
- Class: Insecta
- Order: Lepidoptera
- Family: Hesperiidae
- Genus: Pyrgus
- Species: P. jupei

Binomial name
- Pyrgus jupei (Alberti, 1967)

Synonyms
- Hesperia jupei Alberti, 1967

= Pyrgus jupei =

Species of skipper butterfly genus Pyrgus

Pyrgus jupei, the Caucasian skipper, is a butterfly of the family Hesperiidae. It was described by Buchard Alberti in 1967. It is found in the Caucasus, Turkey and northern Iran. The habitat consists of alpine and subalpine meadow belts.

Adults are on wing from the end of June to August.
