= Pyrgus aladaghensis =

Aladagh skipper

Conservation status
- Data Deficient (IUCN 3.1)

Scientific classification
- Kingdom: Animalia
- Phylum: Arthropoda
- Class: Insecta
- Order: Lepidoptera
- Family: Hesperiidae
- Genus: Pyrgus
- Species: P. aladaghensis

Binomial name
- Pyrgus aladaghensis De Prins & Poorten, 1995

Species of butterfly genus Pyrgus

Pyrgus aladaghensis, also known as the Aladagh skipper or Aladag skipper, is a butterfly of the family of Hesperiidae that was first described by Willy De Prins and Dirk van der Poorten in 1995. It is found on the Aladaglar massive of the Taurus Mountains near Niğde, in southern Turkey.
