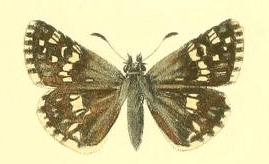

Scientific classification
- Domain: Eukaryota
- Kingdom: Animalia
- Phylum: Arthropoda
- Class: Insecta
- Order: Lepidoptera
- Family: Hesperiidae
- Genus: Pyrgus
- Species: P. alpinus

Binomial name
- Pyrgus alpinus (Erschoff, 1874)

Synonyms
- Syrichthus alpina Erschoff, 1874; Pyrgus alpina

= Pyrgus alpinus =

Species of butterfly genus Pyrgus

Pyrgus alpinus is a butterfly of the family Hesperiidae. It is found from Ghissar to western China and northern India.

== Subspecies ==
- Pyrgus alpinus alpinus
- Pyrgus alpinus alichurensis de Jong, 1975 (southern and eastern Pamirs)
- Pyrgus alpinus mustagatae Alberti, 1952 (Chinese eastern Pamirs)
