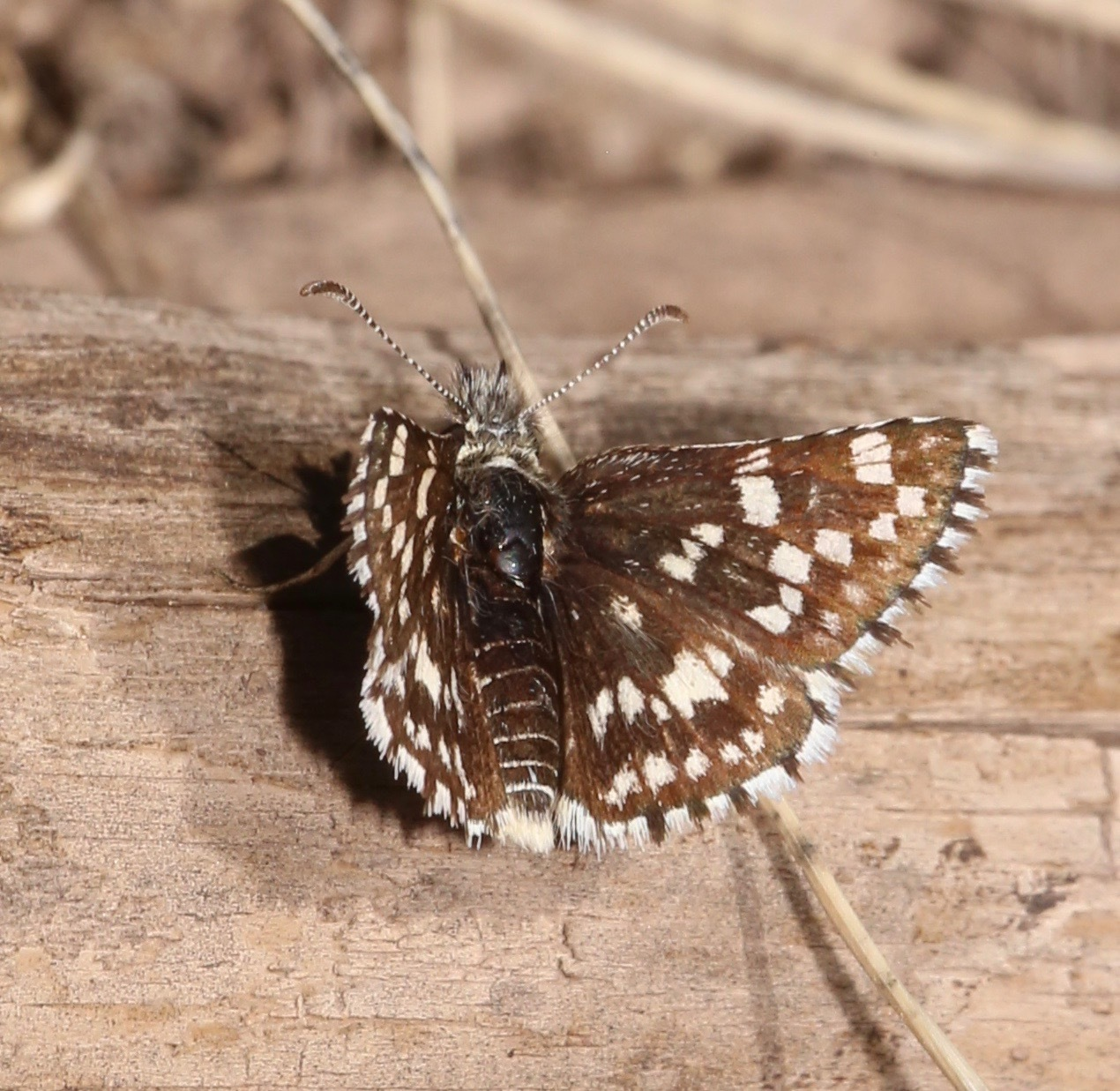

Scientific classification
- Domain: Eukaryota
- Kingdom: Animalia
- Phylum: Arthropoda
- Class: Insecta
- Order: Lepidoptera
- Family: Hesperiidae
- Genus: Pyrgus
- Species: P. xanthus

Binomial name
- Pyrgus xanthus W. H. Edwards, 1878

Synonyms
- Syrichtus macdunnoughi Oberthür, 1914

= Pyrgus xanthus =

Species of skipper butterfly genus Pyrgus

Pyrgus xanthus, the mountain checkered skipper, is a species of spread-wing skipper in the butterfly family Hesperiidae.

The MONA or Hodges number for Pyrgus xanthus is 3964.
