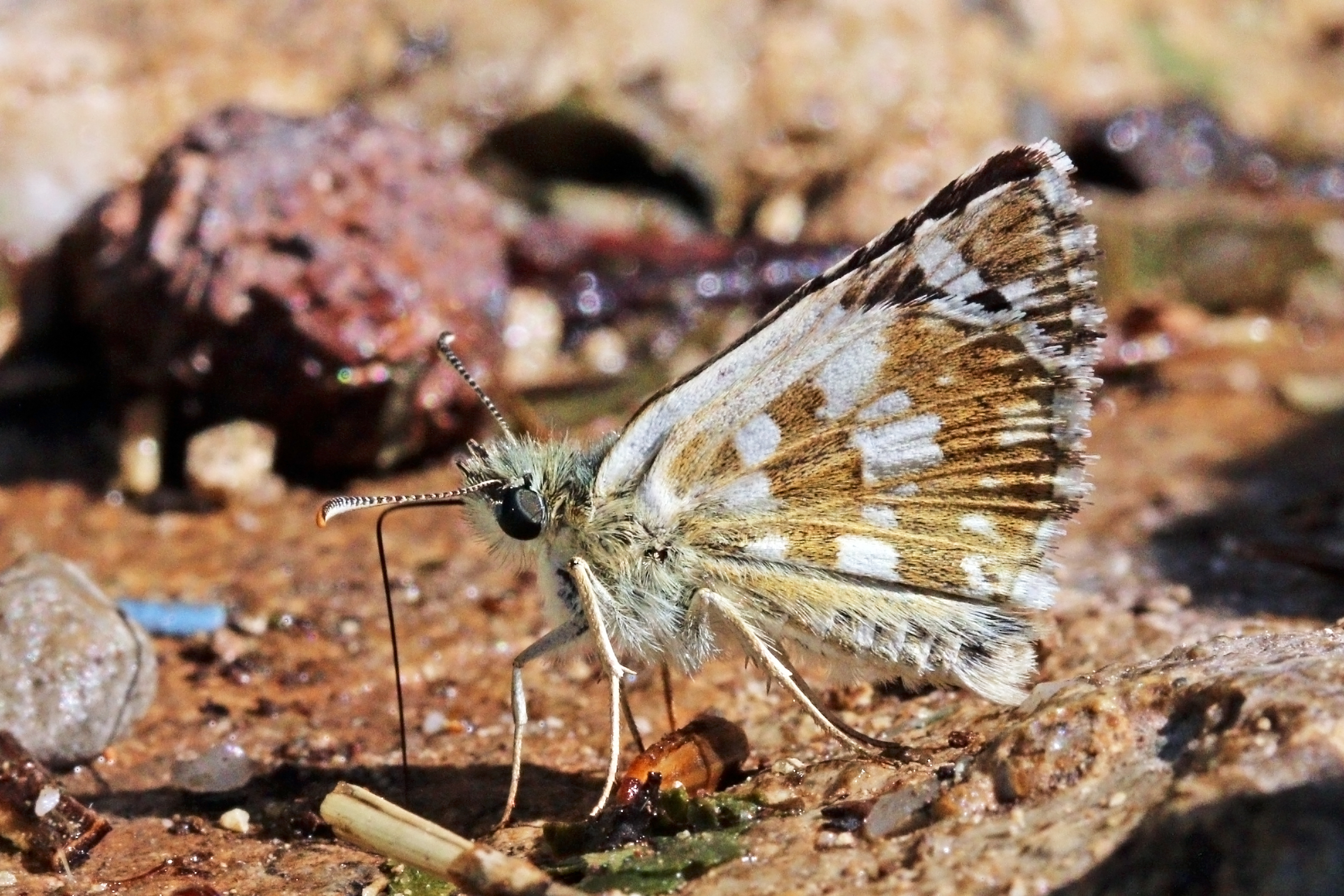

Scientific classification
- Kingdom: Animalia
- Phylum: Arthropoda
- Clade: Pancrustacea
- Class: Insecta
- Order: Lepidoptera
- Family: Hesperiidae
- Genus: Pyrgus
- Species: P. cinarae

Binomial name
- Pyrgus cinarae (Rambur, 1839)

= Sandy grizzled skipper =

Species of skipper butterfly genus Pyrgus

The sandy grizzled skipper (Pyrgus cinarae) is a species of skipper (family Hesperiidae). It has a restricted range in southeastern Europe with a small relict population in central Spain.

As with many Pyrgus species, this can be difficult to identify in the field. It is quite large for the genus (wingspan 30–32 mm) and the underside of the hindwings are usually paler olive-brown than most of its congeners with large white markings but identification generally requires scrutiny in the hand.In Seitz it is described - H. cinarae Rambr. (= cynarae Frr.) (85 i). No marginal row on the forewing, but a very strongly developed median band on both wings, the spots of the band being large and white. Underside of hind- wing light yellowish green. The white discocellular spot not prolonged forward. South Russia, Bulgaria, Turkey, Asia Minor; in June.

The adults are usually seen flying in June. Eggs are laid by females on the flower buds of plants of the genus Potentilla, which are fodder for caterpillars.
