= List of Lepidoptera of Austria =

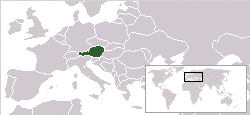
Location of Austria
