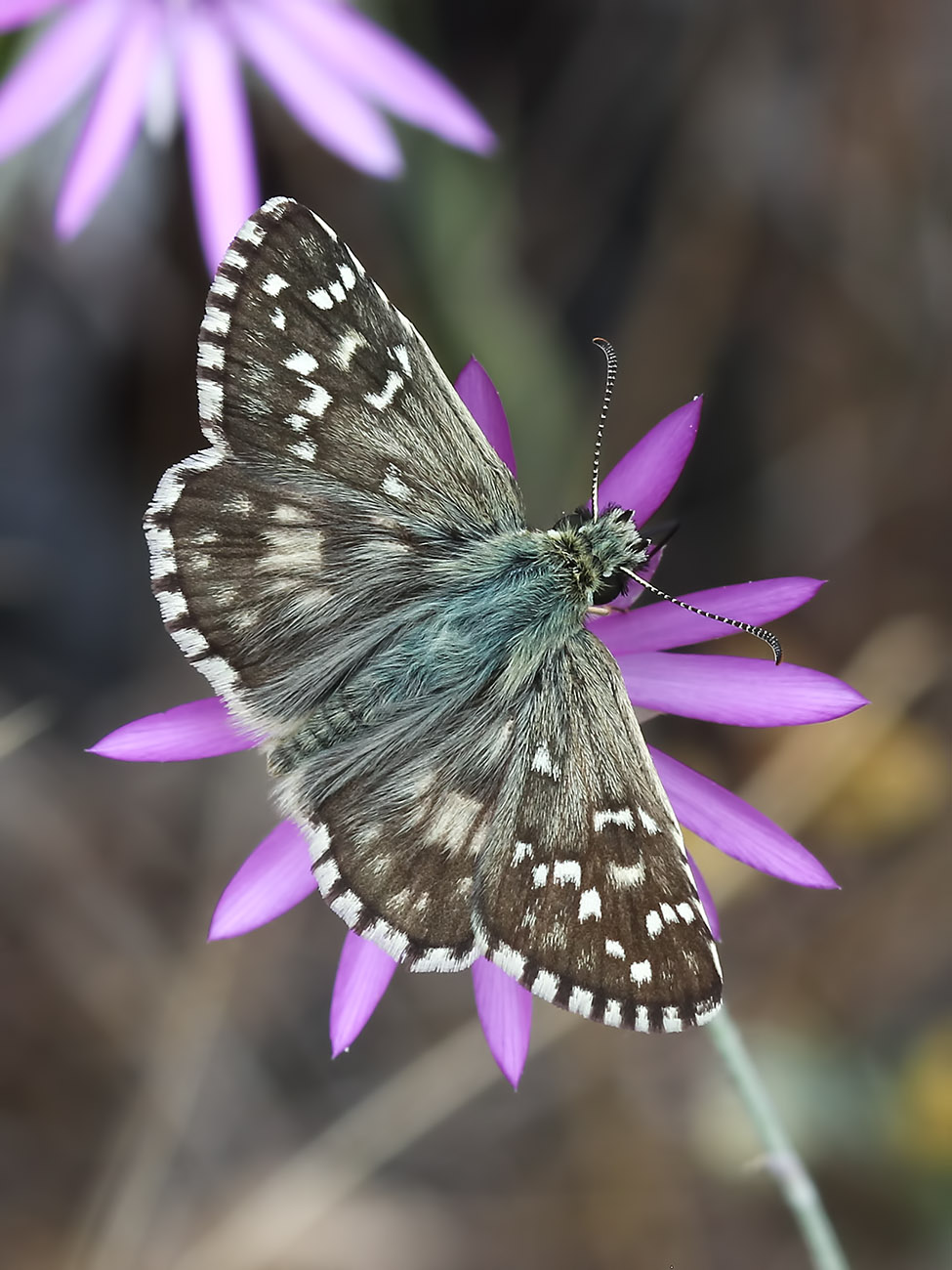

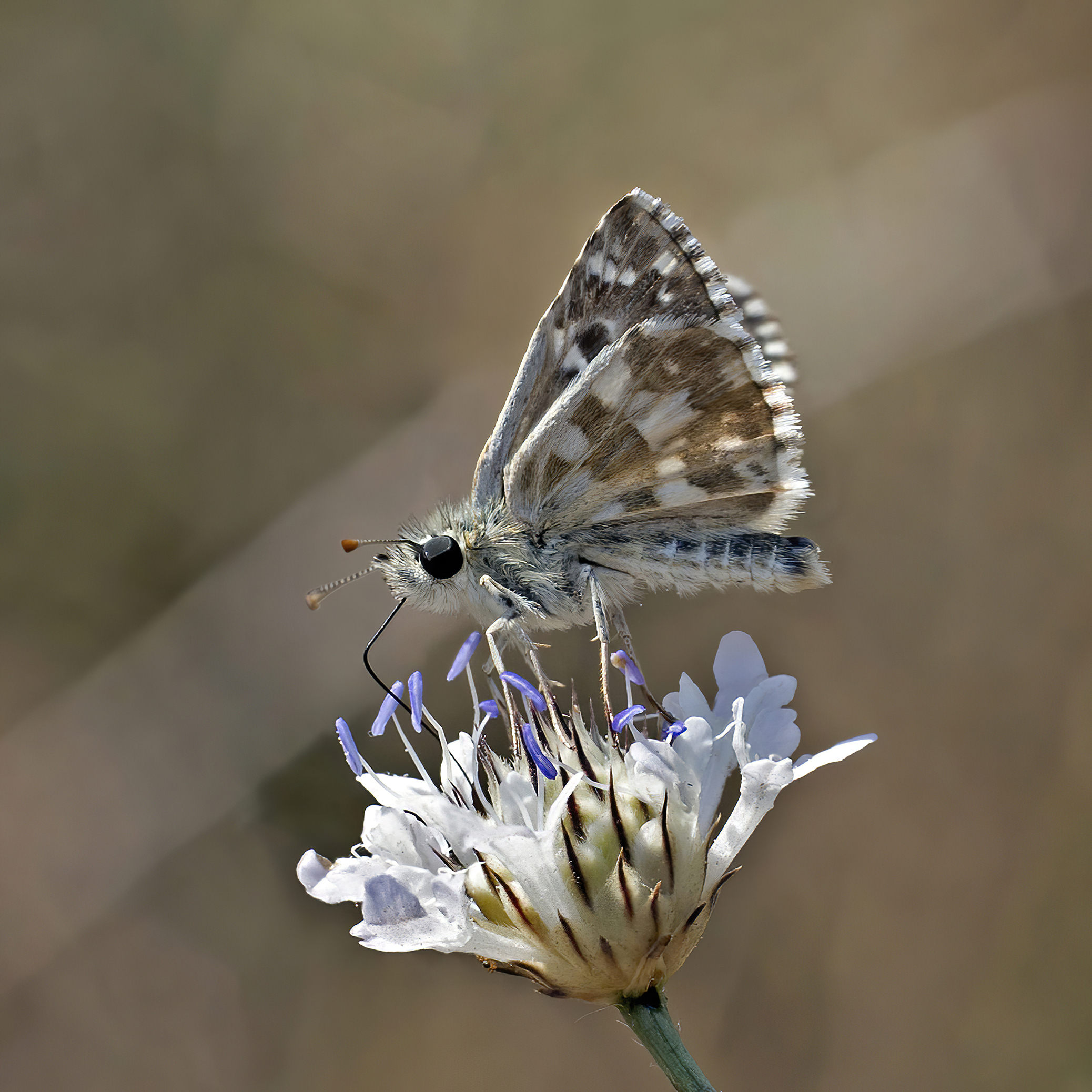

Scientific classification
- Kingdom: Animalia
- Phylum: Arthropoda
- Class: Insecta
- Order: Lepidoptera
- Family: Hesperiidae
- Genus: Pyrgus
- Species: P. armoricanus

Binomial name
- Pyrgus armoricanus (Oberthür, 1910)

= Oberthür's grizzled skipper =

Species of skipper butterfly genus Pyrgus

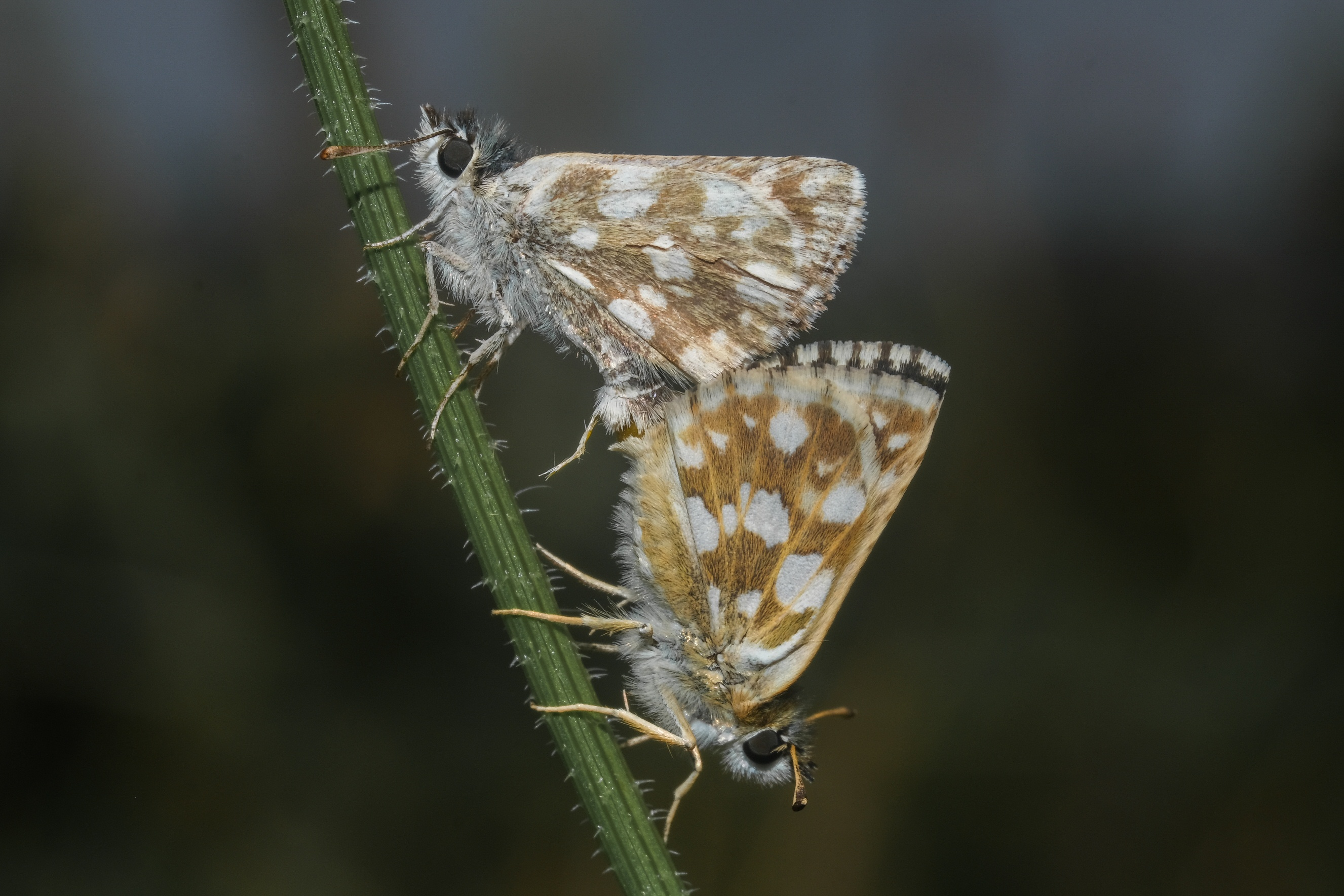
Mating pair

Oberthür's grizzled skipper (Pyrgus armoricanus) is a species of skipper (family Hesperiidae).

== Description ==
Pyrgus armoricanus has a wingspan of 24–28 mm. Both wings have a white fringe along the edges. The upperside of the forewings is dark brown with well developed white markings. On the recto of the hindwings there are clearly visible grayish marks. The underside of the hindwings shows a pale reddish-brown colour with a large pale discal spot and light coloured veins. The males and females are similar in appearance.

Like all Pyrgus species, Pyrgus armoricanus can be very difficult to identify in the field. The upperside of the forewings are often noticeably darker brown than other Pyrgus species, especially when fresh, with clear white markings. It resembles some smaller races of large grizzled skipper (P. alveus). It is slightly larger than Pyrgus malvae. This species is also quite similar to Pyrgus carthami and Pyrgus serratulae. Without a genital examination, there is a high risk of confusion, especially with butterflies of the Pyrgus alveus complex and with Pyrgus cirsii. Compared to Pyrgus alveus, however, the white spots on the upper side of the hind wing are clearly lighter.

The eggs are yellowish, roundish and flattened, with numerous, strong longitudinal ribs. The caterpillars have strong short hairs. They are mostly dark brown to gray-brown, rarely greenish brown or reddish-brown with a black head. Pupae are strongly bluish-frosted with black dots and dashes on the back.

== Range ==
Pyrgus armoricanus is distributed from northwest Africa across southern and parts of central Europe to southern Scandinavia. To the east, the distribution area extends to southern Russia and across Asia Minor to Iran. It is more common in the south of its range and absent from the British Isles.

== Habitat ==
The habitats of Pyrgus armoricanus include a wide range of open land locations with raw soils. In addition to semi-dry and sandy grasslands, this can also be, for example, ruderalized areas and footsteps on unpaved paths. Depending on the natural area and soil substrate, there can be very different habitats. The larval habitats always have sparse and short-grass vegetation. In addition to poor grasslands, mesophilic grassland stands can also be populated, provided they have a sufficient number of open ground areas (including molehills, roadsides, median strips of unpaved roads).

Within the distribution area Pyrgus armoricanus can be found at an elevation of 0-1800 m above sea level. In Bavaria records known so far extends from approximately 190 m in Main Franconia to a little over 800 m above sea level on the edge of the Alps. Permanent and reproductive populations can also be found at altitudes between 200 m and 500 m. Generally in central Europe Pyrgus armoricanus has a narrow altitude distribution and is largely limited to lower altitudes.

== Ecology ==
P. armoricanus flies in May and June with a second generation in the south of the range in August and September. Pyrgus armoricanus develops two generations in Bavaria on average. However, in above-average warm years, which occur more and more frequently, a partial or, as in exceptionally warm years, probably even a full third generation. This happens quite regularly in the Mediterranean region. The flight period of the first generation usually begins by the end of May and ends by the end of June. In very warm springs, imagos can appear as early as three weeks early in May. The second generation individuals usually fly from mid-August to mid / late September. In very warm summers, however, the flight times are significantly earlier. Depending on the weather, there will be less flight time shifts. Adults of this second generation are usually smaller than those of the first.

The females lay their eggs individually on the underside of the leaves of host plants. Eggs are laid on plants in full sun, which mostly grow over open soil or dark litter (e.g. also dry floating debris on river banks). Soil with little vegetation and dark subsoil ensure rapid warming. The majority of the habitats are level locations, south-sloping slopes are used comparatively less often. Extremely xerothermic locations are hardly populated, even with abundant host plants. The caterpillar sites indicate a certain moisture requirement of Pyrgus armoricanus for larval development. Small and more isolated habitats are only populated with a strong increase in or after very favorable years. In these, Pyrgus armoricanus shows particularly strong population fluctuations with temporary complete extinction on individual areas, which is to be interpreted as an indication of a metapopulation structure. The imagos regularly look for flowers to take in nectar and use a wide range of flowering plants.

Both females and males of Pyrgus armoricanus orient themselves visually and specifically look for areas with little vegetation for sunbathing as well as in search of potential egg-laying plants. In most of Europe the larva feeds on Potentilla species (Potentilla tabernaemontani, Potentilla reptans, Potentilla arenaria, Potentilla pedata) and woodland strawberry (Fragaria vesca). In southern Scandinavia (Sweden and Denmark), however, the main larval food plant is Filipendula vulgaris and to some extent also Helianthemum nummularium. Potentilla verna agg. and Potentilla reptans have been documented as larval food and egg-laying plants in Bavaria so far.

The following species are known as food plants for the caterpillars: Potentilla neumanniana [= Potentilla tabernaemontani, Potentilla verna] [southwest Germany and other areas], Potentilla reptans [southwest Germany and other areas], Potentilla argentea [southwest Germany and other areas], Potentilla recta [Upper Rhine], Potentilla erecta [Black Forest, Italy and Salzburg], Potentilla sterilis [= Potentilla fragariastrum] [Black Forest], Potentilla pusilla [Switzerland, Italy], Potentilla hirta [France], Potentilla gelida [Russia], Potentilla pedata [Russia], Filipendula vulgaris [Sweden], Fragaria vesca [Palatinate], Agrimonia eupatoria [Palatinate], Helianthemum nummularium agg. [= Helianthemum vulgare] [oviposition observations in different regions, breeding with this plant runs without problems], Helianthemum ovatum [Lower Austria].

The caterpillar overwinters.

== Conservation ==
Basically for Pyrgus armoricanus, under favorable climatic conditions there is the potential for strong and rapid spread. In order for this to be effective, however, it is imperative that the core populations remain in good condition. Much of the Pyrgus armoricanus habitats are grazed by sheep. High grazing frequencies often have a demanding effect, as intensive grazing of the sward often results in optimal, flat-growing and gappy structures. Sheep grazing, especially with the low to medium intensity that is predominantly common today, is not sufficient in all locations to create the necessary gaps in vegetation structure and should therefore be supplemented with additional measures depending on the area. In addition, new pioneering sites can be created in the course of compensatory measures by staggered top soil removal.

== Etymology ==
The species is named after the French entomologist Charles Oberthür (1845–1924) who originally described it.

== Taxonomy ==
Subspecies include:

- Pyrgus armoricanus maroccanus Picard, 1950 (Algeria and Morocco)
- Pyrgus armoricanus persicus (Reverdin, 1913)

== Bibliography ==
- Juan L. Hernandez-Roldan at al. Comparative analysis and taxonomic use of the morphology of immature stages and natural history traits in European species of Pyrgus Hübner (Lepidoptera: Hesperiidae, Pyrginae)
- V. K. Tuzov et al.: Guide to the Butterflies of Russia and adjacent territories. 480 S., Sofia und Moskau 1997
- Erik Öckinger: Possible Metapopulation Structure of the Threatened Butterfly Pyrgus armoricanus in Sweden. Journal of Insect Conservation, 10(1): 43–51, London 2006 doi:10.1007/s10841-005-1249-7
