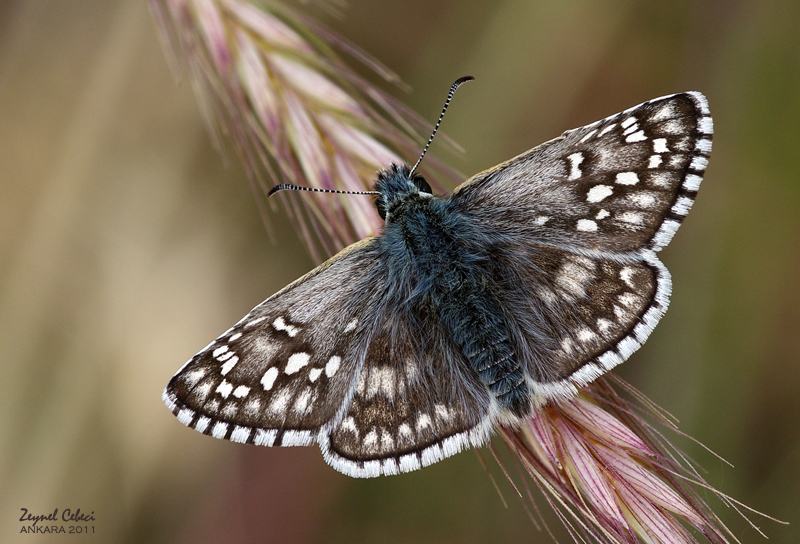

Scientific classification
- Kingdom: Animalia
- Phylum: Arthropoda
- Clade: Pancrustacea
- Class: Insecta
- Order: Lepidoptera
- Family: Hesperiidae
- Genus: Pyrgus
- Species: P. sidae

Binomial name
- Pyrgus sidae (Esper, 1784)

= Pyrgus sidae =

Species of skipper butterfly genus Pyrgus

Pyrgus sidae, the yellow-banded skipper, is a species of skipper (family Hesperiidae). It is found from the Iberian Peninsula (only an isolated occurrence in the Sierra de Gredos) through southern and eastern Europe, southeast France, the northwestern coastal areas of central Italy, then Istria (Slovenia and Croatia) and the Balkan Peninsula, across Turkey, Transcaucasia, to Iran and Afghanistan. East of the Southern Ural Mountains the range extends to northwest Kazakhstan and the west of the Tien Shan in the north.

Pyrgus species are usually difficult to separate in the field but P. sidae is a notable exception. It is the largest member of the genus found in Europe with a wingspan of 32–38 mm and can be instantly recognized by two bold black-edged yellow bands on the underside of the hindwings. The dark brown upper forewings are also boldly marked with numerous large white spots.Seitz describes it "Underside of hindwing with two light orange-red bands which are bordered with black, extend to vein 7 and terminate with a black spot in interspace 8. The white spots on the upperside of the forewing very small; the two spots in interspaces 2 and 8 smaller than all the others" The adults fly in June and July.

The larval food plant is Abutilon avicennae.
