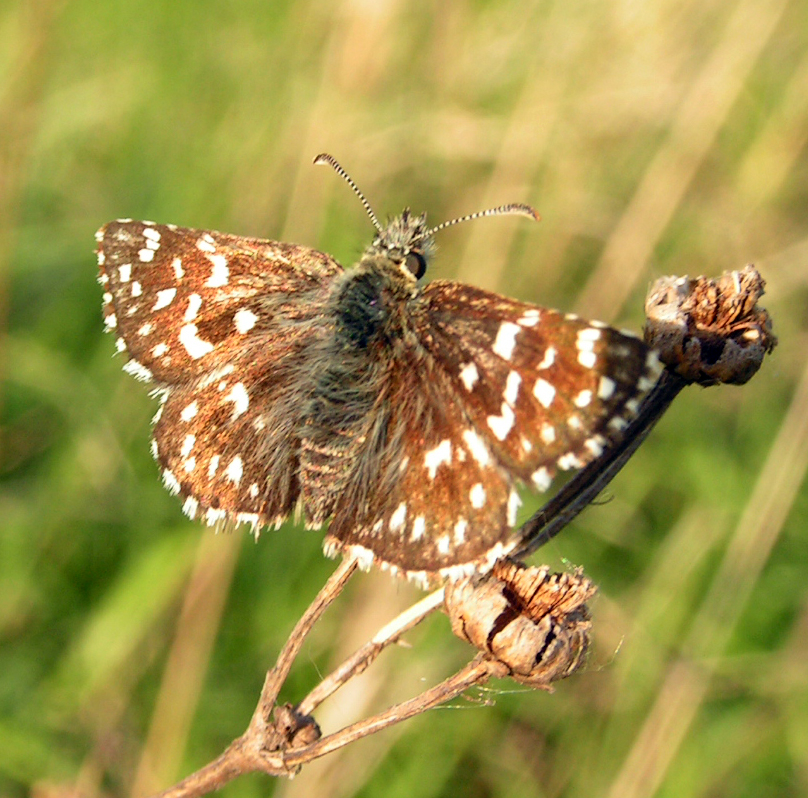
- Grizzled skipper (Pyrgus malvae )

Scientific classification
- Kingdom: Animalia
- Phylum: Arthropoda
- Class: Insecta
- Order: Lepidoptera
- Family: Hesperiidae
- Tribe: Pyrgini
- Genus: Pyrgus; Hübner, [1819]

Synonyms
- Urbanus Hübner, [1806] (suppressed); Scelotrix Rambur, 1858; Bremeria Tutt, 1906; Teleomorpha Warren, 1926; Hemiteleomorapha Warren, 1926; Ateleomorpha Warren, 1926

= Pyrgus =

Grizzled skippers

Butterfly genus known as grizzled skippers

Pyrgus is a genus in the skippers butterfly family, Hesperiidae, known as the grizzled skippers. The name "checkered" or "chequered skipper" may also be applied to some species, but also refers to species in the genera Burnsius and Carterocephalus. They occur in the Holarctic with an additional group of species extending to the Neotropic.

In 2019, most of the species of Pyrgus found in the North, Central, or South America were moved to the genera Burnsius, Chirgus, and Heliopetes. The remaining Pyrgus species found in the New World are Pyrgus centaureae, ruralis, scriptura, and xanthus.

== Species ==
These species belong to the genus Pyrgus:

- Pyrgus accretus (Verity, 1925)
- Pyrgus aladaghensis de Prins & van der Poorten, 1995 (aladag skipper)
- Pyrgus alpinus Erschoff, 1874
- Pyrgus alveus (Hübner, 1803) (large grizzled skipper)
- Pyrgus andromedae (Wallengren, 1853) (alpine grizzled skipper)
- Pyrgus armoricanus (Oberthür, 1910) (oberthür's grizzled skipper)
- Pyrgus bieti (Oberthür, 1886)
- Pyrgus bolkariensis de Prins & van der Poorten, 1995 (bolkar skipper)
- Pyrgus cacaliae (Rambur, 1839) (dusky grizzled skipper)
- Pyrgus carlinae (Rambur, 1839) (carline skipper)
- Pyrgus carthami (Hübner, 1813) (safflower skipper)
- Pyrgus centaureae (Rambur, 1842) (northern grizzled skipper)
- Pyrgus centralitaliae (Verity, 1920)
- Pyrgus chapmani Warren, 1926
- Pyrgus cinarae (Rambur, 1839) (sandy grizzled skipper)
- Pyrgus cirsii (Rambur, 1839) (cinquefoil skipper)
- Pyrgus foulquieri (Oberthür, 1910) (foulquier's grizzled skipper)
- Pyrgus iliensis (Reverdin, 1912)
- Pyrgus jupei (Alberti, 1967) (caucasian skipper)
- Pyrgus maculatus Bremer & Grey, 1853
- Pyrgus malvae (Linnaeus, 1758) (grizzled skipper)
- Pyrgus malvoides (Elwes & Edwards, 1897) (southern grizzled skipper)
- Pyrgus melotis Duponchel, 1832 (aegean skipper)
- Pyrgus nepalensis Higgins, 1984
- Pyrgus onopordi (Rambur, 1839) (rosy grizzled skipper)
- Pyrgus picenus Verity, 1920
- Pyrgus pontica Reverdin, 1914
- Pyrgus ruralis (Boisduval, 1852) (two-banded checkered skipper)
- Pyrgus scriptura (Boisduval, 1852) (small checkered skipper)
- Pyrgus serratulae (Rambur, 1839) (olive skipper)
- Pyrgus sibirica (Reverdin, 1911)
- Pyrgus sidae (Esper, 1784) (yellow-banded skipper)
- Pyrgus speyeri (Staudinger, 1887)
- Pyrgus warrenensis (Verity, 1928) (warren's skipper)
- Pyrgus xanthus W. H. Edwards, 1878 (mountain checkered skipper)

== References and external links ==
- Yellow-banded Skipper page
- Pyrgus ruralis page
- Edinburg WBC NE Mexico Trip
- Safflower Skipper
- Moths and butterflies of Europe and North Africa
- English butterfly names for North America
- List of Hesperiidae photographed by O. Kosterin
- Funet
