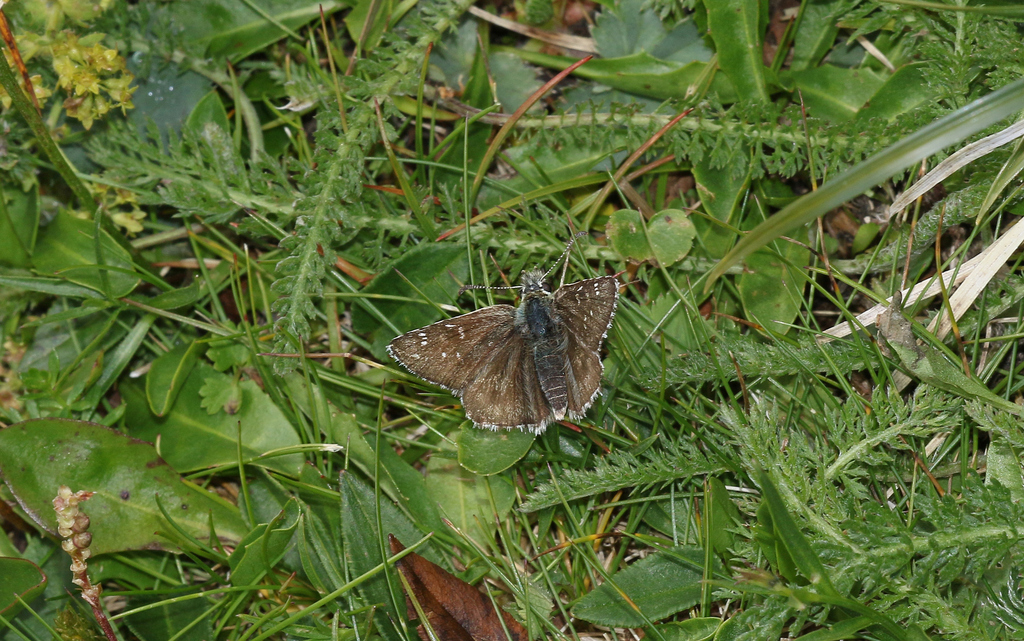

Scientific classification
- Domain: Eukaryota
- Kingdom: Animalia
- Phylum: Arthropoda
- Class: Insecta
- Order: Lepidoptera
- Family: Hesperiidae
- Genus: Pyrgus
- Species: P. warrenensis

Binomial name
- Pyrgus warrenensis (Verity, 1928)

= Pyrgus warrenensis =

Warren's skipper

Species of skipper butterfly genus Pyrgus

Pyrgus warrenensis, The Alpine Rockrose Skipper also known as Warren's Skipper or Warren's Skipper, is a butterfly in the skipper family (Hesperiidae). The specific epithet in the scientific name honors the Irish entomologist B.C.S. Warren (1887–1979).

== Characteristics ==
The forewing length of the males is 10 to 13 millimeters. Differentiating it from the similar species, the Olive Skipper (Pyrgus serratulae), are its narrower and more pointed forewings. Additionally they have fewer white spots. The underside of the hindwings is a washed out pale gray and the median band is reduced.

The egg is round and flattened at both ends. The surface of the egg has about 15 bold, somewhat irregular longitudinal ribs. Initially a pale yellow, the egg gradually turns a light reddish color shortly before hatching into a caterpillar.

The caterpillar is usually somewhat stocky, brownish in color, and has a black head. It is moderately hairy. Like the caterpillar of Pyrgus andromedae, it has a well-developed, black, and sclerotized anal shield.

The pupa has a distinct, light-blue dusting on its back. Despite the dusting, a black pattern of dots is clearly visible, along with a black longitudinal line on the dorsal side of the thorax. In contrast, the ventral side is barely dusted, displaying a gray to grayish-brown base color.

== Geographical range and distribution ==
The Alpine Rockrose Skipper, is found through the Central and Eastern Alps on sunny, low-growing, alpine meadows at an altitude of 1700 to 2700 meters.[4] However the host plant of the caterpillar, Alpine Rockrose (Helianthemum alpestre), is needed for reproduction.

== Lifecycle ==
The species has a two-year development cycle. The adults fly in July and lay their eggs on the caterpillar's host plant.The moths have been seen drinking nectar from thyme (Thymus) sp., alpine aster (Aster alpinus), alpine bird's-foot trefoil (Lotus alpinus), clover (Trifolium) and houseleeks (Sempervivum). The caterpillar hatches in the same year and overwinters as a caterpillar. The following year it slowly grows. The caterpillar in its final larval stage then overwinters a second time. In total the caterpillar molts a total of five times. Overwintering takes place in a cocoon that the caterpillar creates from soil, moss, and both dry and living leaves of the host plant. The caterpillar feeds exclusively on its host plant.

== Conservation ==
The Alpine Rockrose Skipper is endangered in the central europe portion of its range.
