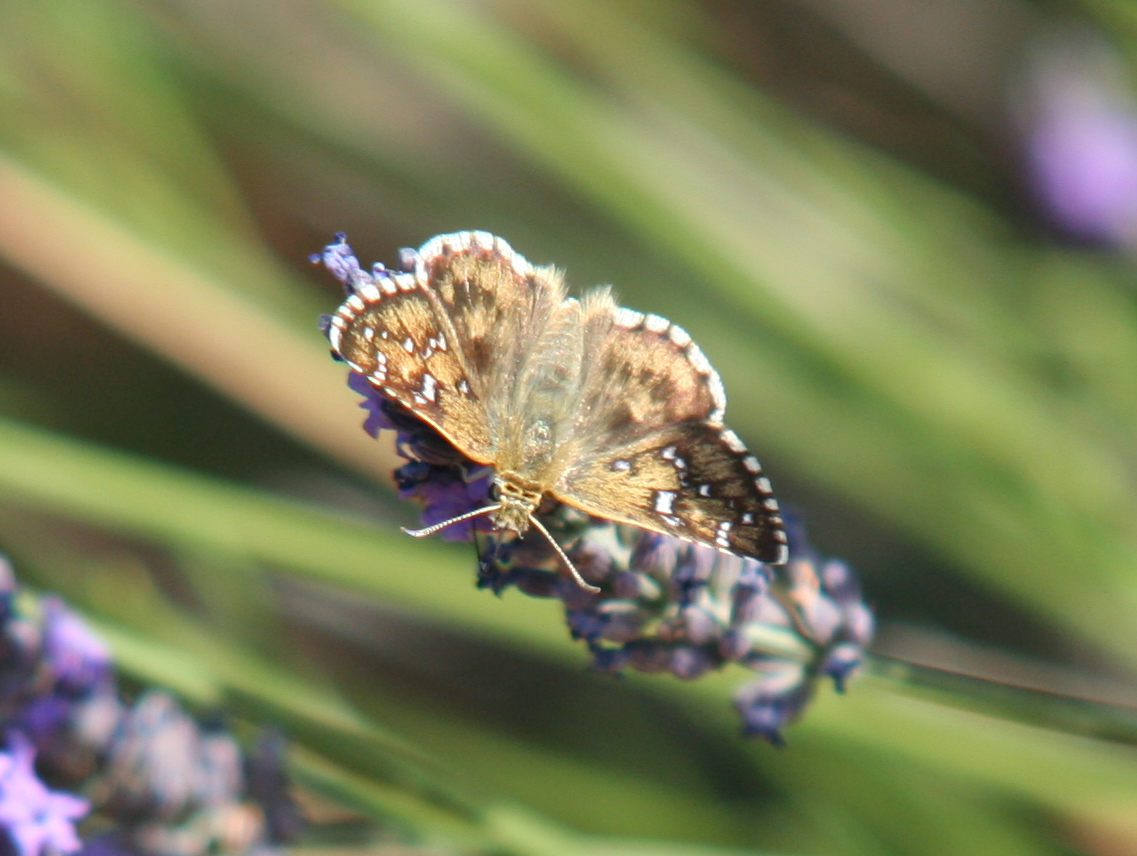

Conservation status
- Vulnerable (IUCN 3.1)

Scientific classification
- Kingdom: Animalia
- Phylum: Arthropoda
- Class: Insecta
- Order: Lepidoptera
- Family: Hesperiidae
- Genus: Pyrgus
- Species: P. cirsii

Binomial name
- Pyrgus cirsii (Rambur, 1839)

= Cinquefoil skipper =

Species of skipper butterfly

The Cinquefoil Skipper (Pyrgus cirsii) is a species of skipper butterfly (family Hesperiidae).

== Description ==
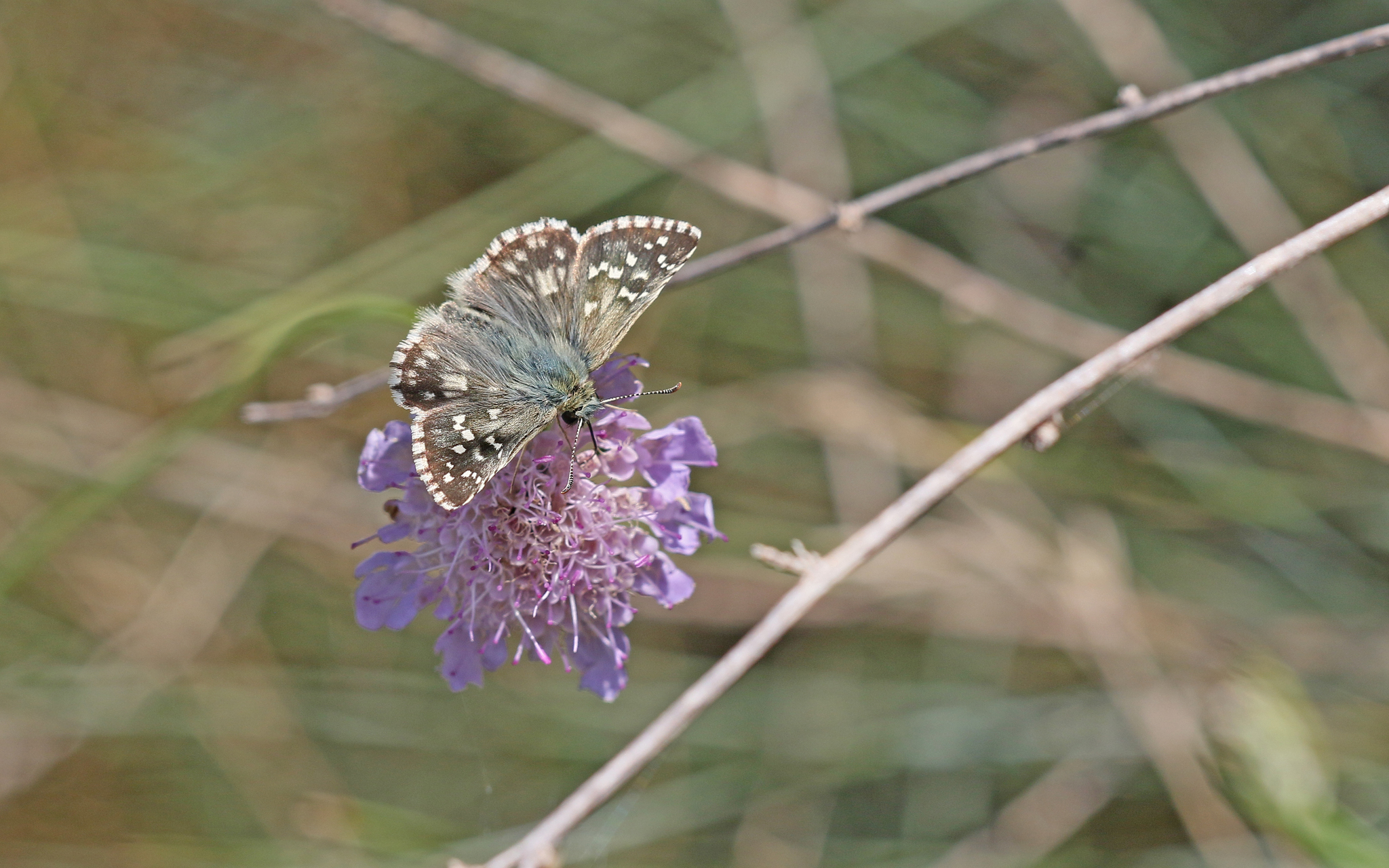
Cinquefoil Skipper (Pyrgus cirsii), Bédouès-Cocurès, France, August 2021

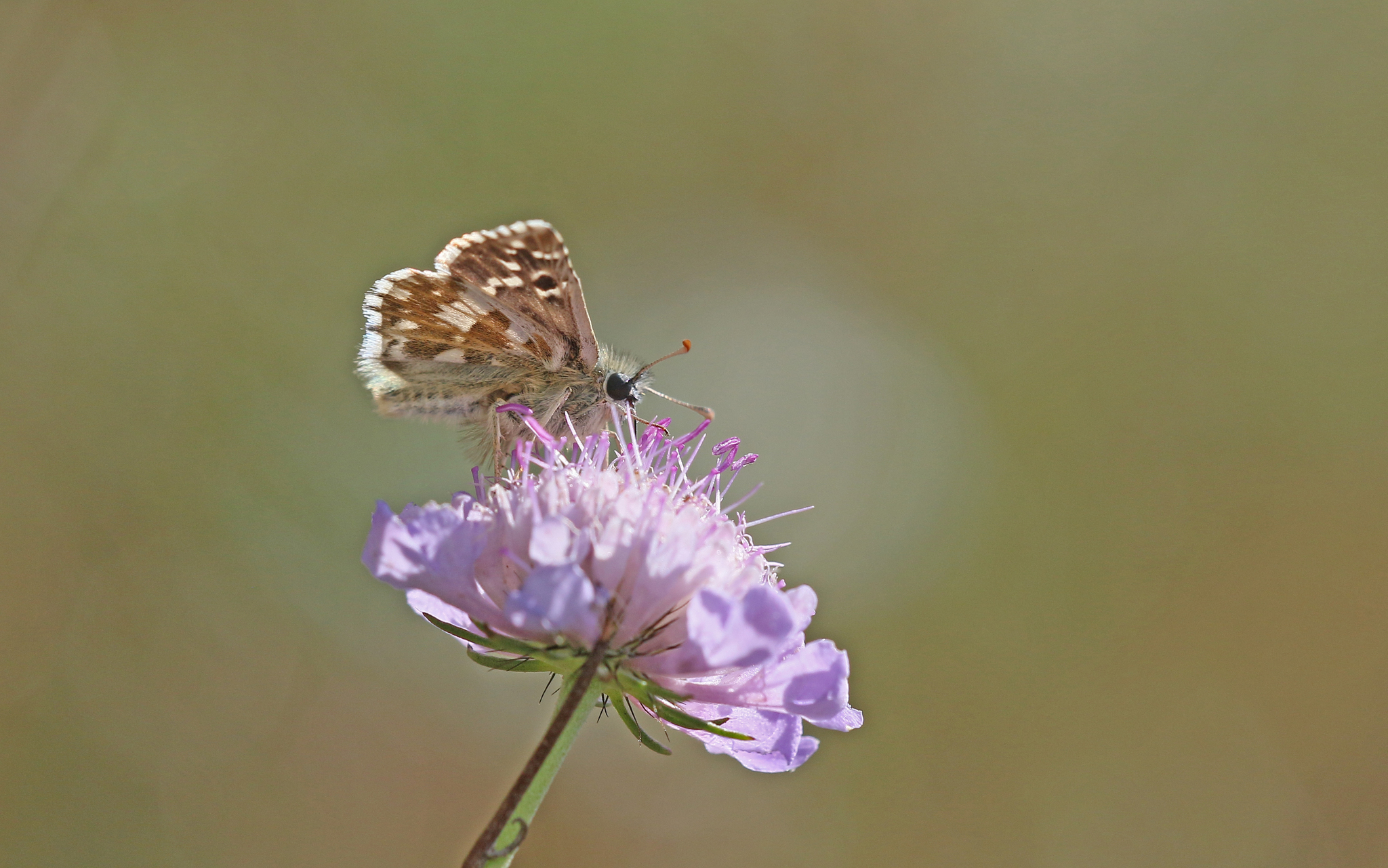
Cinquefoil Skipper (Pyrgus cirsii), Bédouès-Cocurès, France, August 2021

This species has a wingspan of 26–28 mm and, typically of its genus, can be very difficult to identify in the field.

Pyrgus cirsii is a medium-sized skipper. There is basically a possibility of confusion with other species of the genus Pyrgus, in particular with Pyrgus armoricanus. Characteristic of Pyrgus cirsii is a large square discoidal spot on the upper side of the forewing and almost always a second point-like mark over the basal spot on the upper side of the forewing. The hind wing underside is often ocher to reddish brown and stands out from other species of the genus. It is sometimes considered a subspecies of the Carline Skipper (P. carlinae) as the two are known to interbreed where their ranges overlap in the Alps but can usually be recognised by the prominent squarish, rather than c-shaped, white spot near the costa of the forewing and the usually deeper red-brown underwings. A reliable separation in this genus, which is difficult to determine according to external characteristics, is possible through genital examination.

== Range ==
Pyrgus cirsii is widespread from Spain to Central Europe. According to current knowledge, there is also evidence from the Caucasus and Eastern Anatolia, as there are several isolated populations in north-eastern Turkey and in Armenia.

== Habitat ==
The current habitats of Pyrgus cirsii are sparsely overgrown, with open ground interspersed, full sun dry grasslands in stony, shallow and base-rich locations. Almost without exception, the current habitats are subject to regular and relatively intensive grazing, and they are also characterized by large pads of Potentilla verna agg. In the past, extremely sparse pine stands were also populated in Bavaria. In addition to these qualitative characteristics, the overall size of the habitat obviously plays an important role. E. g. all Bavarian occurrences are or were in areas with large, contiguous grassland complexes. A minimum size of the living space with corresponding open ground structures or the very close connection of these dry turf areas is obviously essential.

== Ecology ==
Pyrgus cirsii forms one generation per year, at least in Bavaria. It appears relatively late in the year from late July to mid-September. As a rule, the flight season begins at the end of July / beginning of August with a peak in the second half of August. The last moths, mostly females, can be observed in mid-September.

The reports of finds in Bavaria range from 160 m in Main Franconia to around 500 m in the Northern Franconian Jura, with a focus of 280 m to 400 m.

When visiting flowers, the imagos (males and females) behave opportunistically and use a wide range of different colored flowers. The males also like to suckle on moist soil. Pyrgus cirsii can occur in numbers in suitable habitats.

According to current knowledge, Pyrgus cirsii caterpillars probably lives exclusively on cinquefoil species (Potentilla, Rosaceae). In Central Europe by far the most important is the spring cinquefoil (Potentilla verna agg. = Potentilla tabernaemontani). Other proven caterpillar forage plants are Potentilla cinerea, Potentilla incana [= Potentilla arenaria], Potentilla hirta and Potentilla pusilla. Potentilla verna agg. has so far been proven as a larval food and egg-laying plant from Bavaria. Potentilla verna agg. is also mentioned as a host plant from Baden-Württemberg and Switzerland. Potentilla incana is given for Alsace. After laying eggs in August and September, the caterpillar overwinters until the coming spring. The first newly hatched caterpillars were found on the Swabian Alb in March. The caterpillars live in the leaf bags characteristic of the Pyrgus species and can therefore be searched for in a targeted manner. The development of the caterpillar to the imagos takes a relatively long time with over three months.

Both sexes of Pyrgus cirsii are based on the structure of the terrain and specifically seek out the areas with little vegetation. The males occupy territories here and defend them against their male counterparts. Almost all imagos that fly by are checked for a short period of time. Females that are ready to lay eggs fly very low and land on the sparse vegetation of the raw soil in search of places to lay their eggs. Recognizing the right food plant is obviously not possible "from the air", which is shown by the chance landing on very different plant species. After landing, it immediately checks the suitability of the plant by lowering the feelers on the leaves. If it is not a cinquefoil, the female continues to look for neighboring plants in the area, which are checked again in this way. If the search for suitable cinquefoil plants is successful, various leaves of the same are thoroughly drummed with the antennae. If a leaf is finally assessed as suitable, the eggs are usually laid on the underside of the leaf, sometimes also on the stem of the food plant.

== Conservation ==
Like most Pyrgus species, Pyrgus cirsii needs a fairly large habitat and colonizes xerothermic limestone grasslands. The caterpillars are only found in the leanest, driest places. These places are in decline due to eutrophication, among other things from the air, decline in migratory sheep farming, in addition to the general loss of habitat due to loss of all kinds of grassland communities and climate changes. Increasing isolation might be a main reason for the strongly regressive population development of the species. As soon as the vegetation becomes denser and Potentilla stands between denser, higher plants, no successful larval development and usually no more oviposition can be expected.

For Pyrgus cirsii, protective measures have been introduced and maintenance measures have been carried out in the Steigerwald since 1998 as part of a species aid program. This resulted in clearing of bushes and clearing of grasslands to enlarge the current habitats. At the same time, de-bushed areas were reintegrated into regular grazing and are now becoming more or more intensive, i.e. grazed at a higher frequency. The current habitats are all grazed with sheep and goats at least twice a year, usually much more frequently.

== Taxonomy ==
Some authors only accept the separation of P. carlinae and P. cirsii at the subspecies level.
