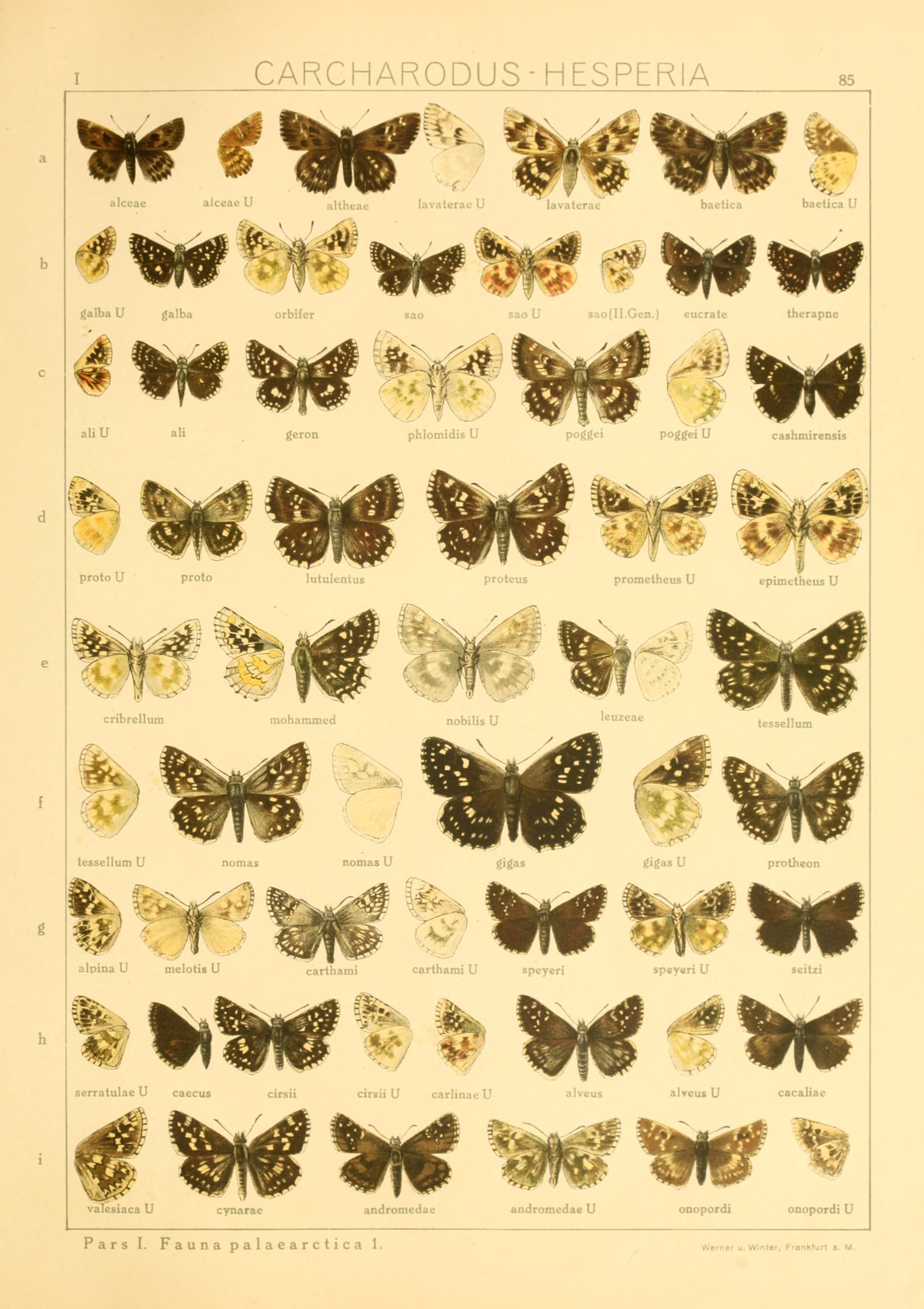
- h

Scientific classification
- Domain: Eukaryota
- Kingdom: Animalia
- Phylum: Arthropoda
- Class: Insecta
- Order: Lepidoptera
- Family: Hesperiidae
- Genus: Pyrgus
- Species: P. carlinae

Binomial name
- Pyrgus carlinae (Rambur, 1839)

= Carline skipper =

Species of skipper butterfly genus Pyrgus

The carline skipper (Pyrgus carlinae) is a butterfly and a species of the skipper (family Hesperiidae). It is a montane butterfly only found in southwestern areas of the Alps. It can be an abundant species within this restricted range.

As with most Pyrgus species, the carline skipper can be difficult to identify in the field. The dark brown upper forewings are marked with relatively small white markings but can usually be separated from the olive skipper (Pyrgus serratulae) by a c-shaped white mark close to the costa and the reddish-brown, not olive green, colour of the under hindwings, with a large square pale spot close to the margin. The wingspan is 26–28 mm.

== Description in Seitz ==
H. carlinae Rambr. (85 h). Underside of hindwing reddish brown; the white spots between veins 2 and 4 much reduced; in interspace 2 a white, usually rounded, spot, which belongs to the subterminal band, the latter being otherwise but feebly marked. In the Alps and the mountains of Arragonia. The adults are on the wing from June to August.

== Biology ==
The larval food plant is spring cinquefoil.
