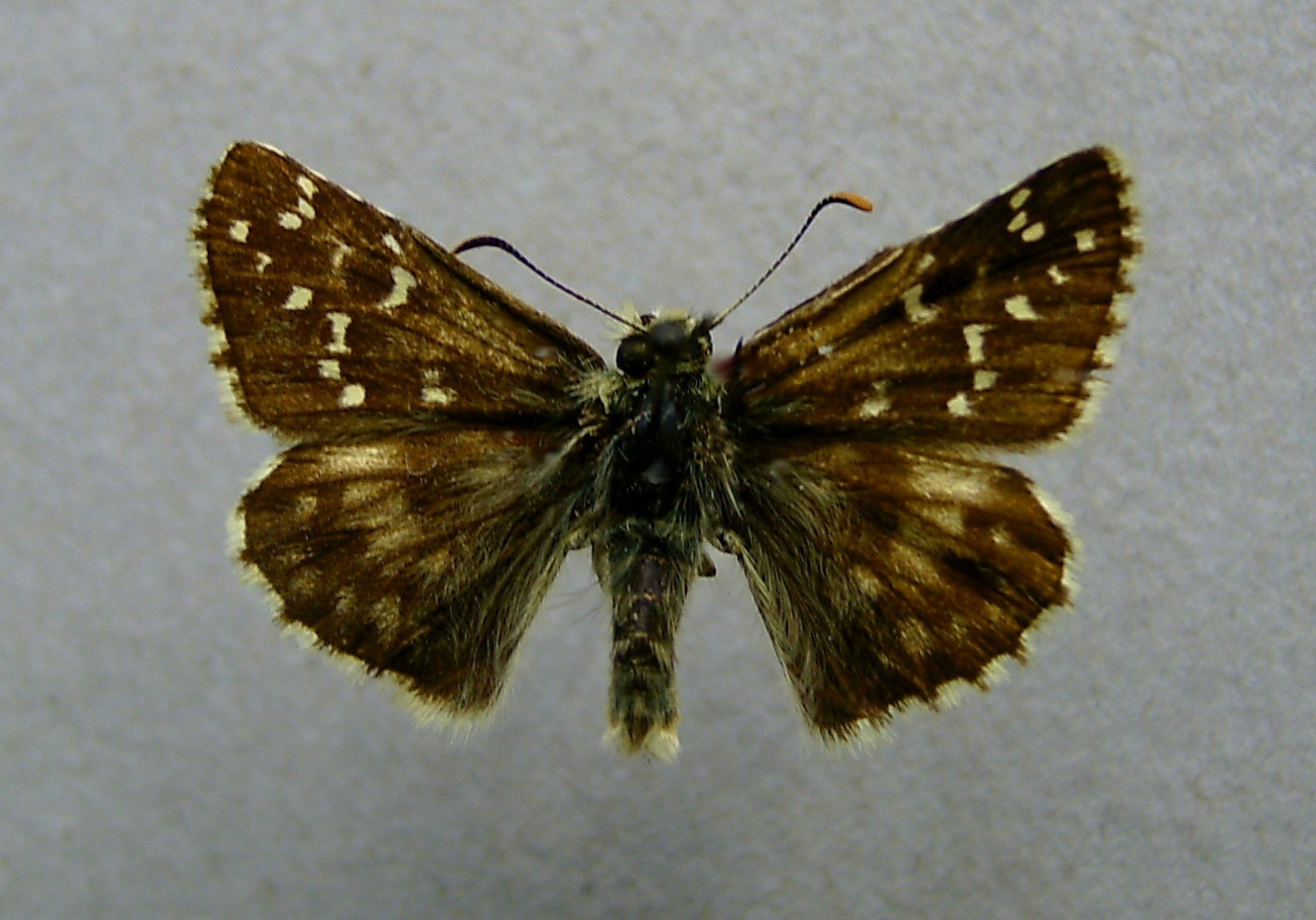

Scientific classification
- Kingdom: Animalia
- Phylum: Arthropoda
- Class: Insecta
- Order: Lepidoptera
- Family: Hesperiidae
- Genus: Pyrgus
- Species: P. alveus

Binomial name
- Pyrgus alveus (Hübner, 1803)

= Large grizzled skipper =

Species of skipper butterfly genus Pyrgus

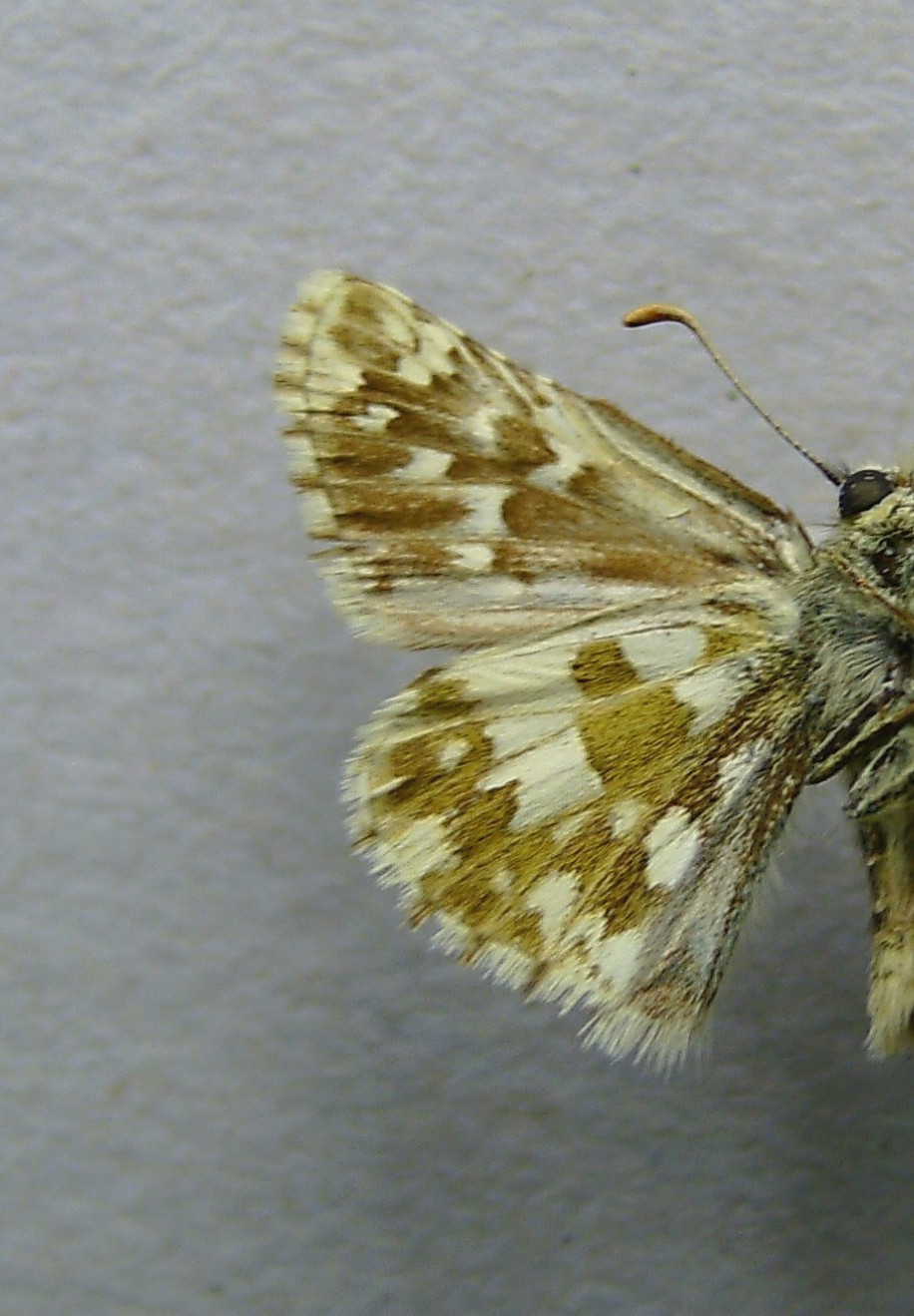
Underside

The Large Grizzled skipper (Pyrgus alveus) is a species of skipper butterfly (family Hesperiidae).

== Description ==
This is a rather variable species with a wingspan of 22–32 mm (not always particularly "large") with several subspecies having been described. As with most Pyrgus species it has dark brown wings with pale chequered margins and is rather difficult to identify specifically in the field but good views reveal clear, well-spaced white spotting on the forewing and much fainter markings on the hindwings.

The species complex of Pyrgus alveus agg. has not yet been adequately researched from a taxonomic point of view. In particular, the separation and evaluation of the taxa Pyrgus alveus, Pyrgus trebevicensis and Pyrgus accretus is considered to be extremely problematic. Therefore, in many cases, the reports can neither be clearly assigned nor is a taxonomic separation based on biological differences within the complex confirmed. Many authors consequently regard Pyrgus trebevicensis and Pyrgus accretus as synonyms, subspecies or ecological forms of Pyrgus alveus. Because of the hitherto unsolved problems with regard to taxonomy and identification, the complex Pyrgus alveus / Pyrgus trebevicensis is referred to below as Pyrgus alveus agg.

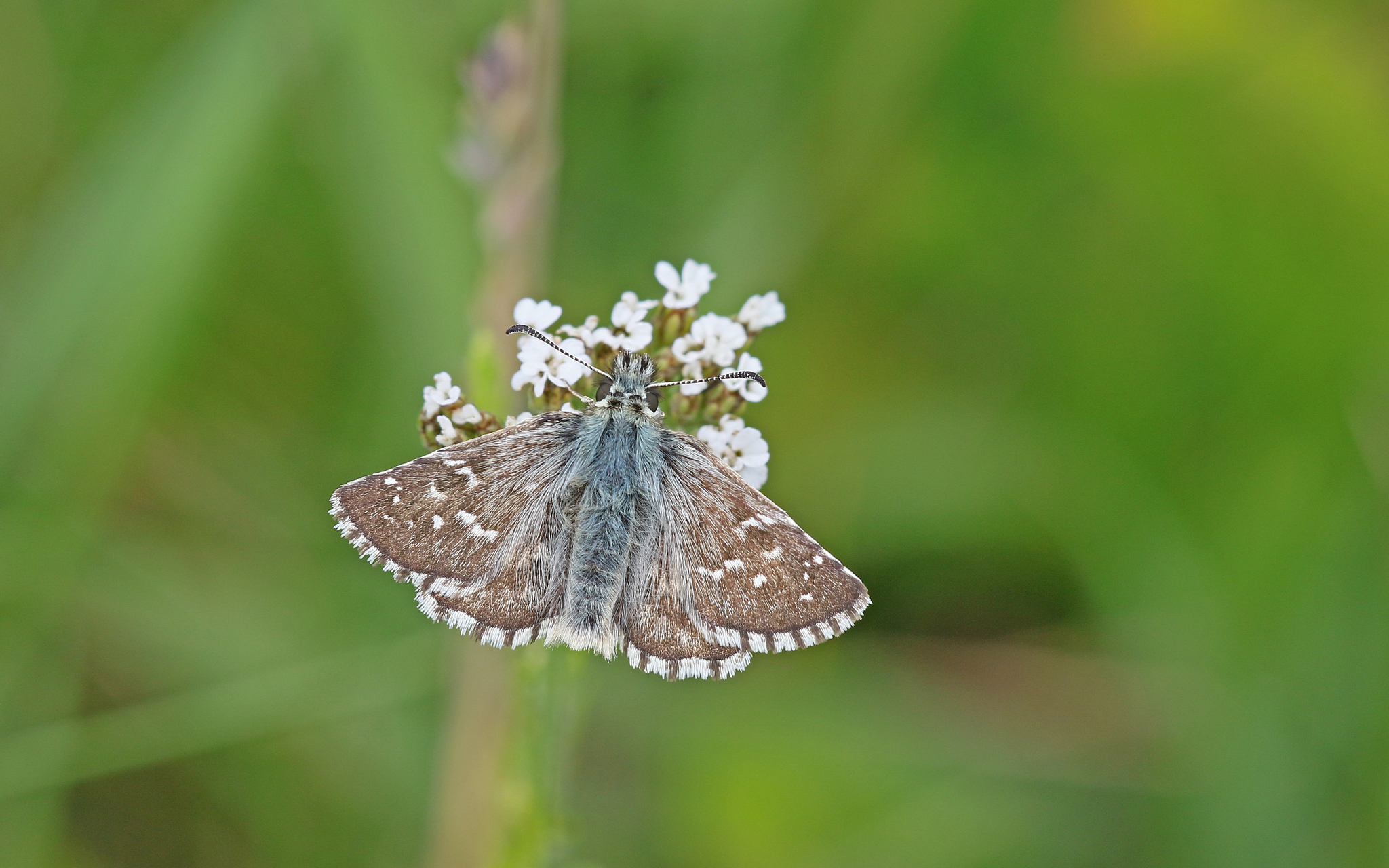
Large Grizzled Skipper (Pyrgus alveus), Gran Paradiso, Valle d'Aosta, Aosta, Italy, August 2021

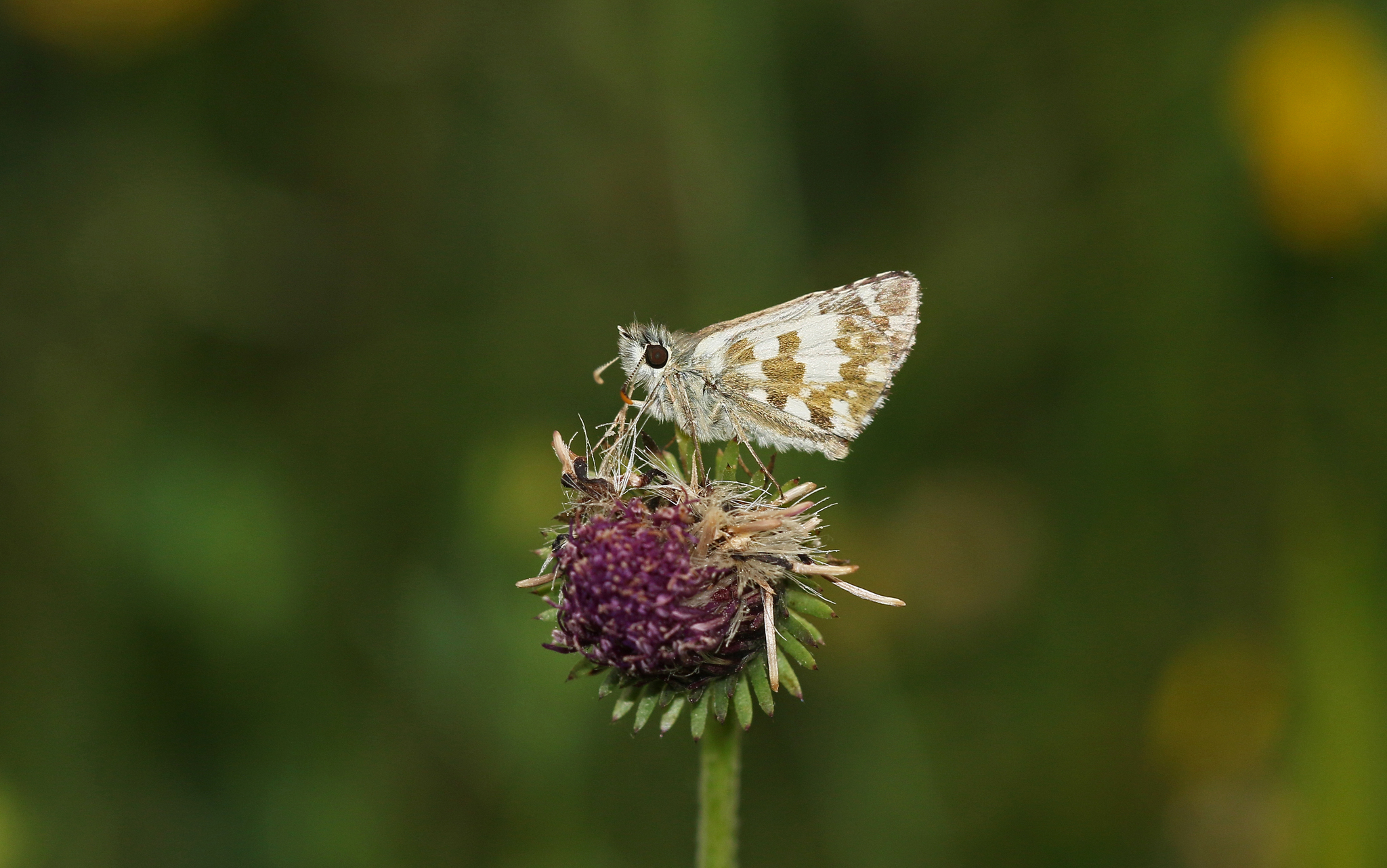
Large Grizzled Skipper (Pyrgus alveus), Ostallgäu, Bavaria, Germany, June 2021

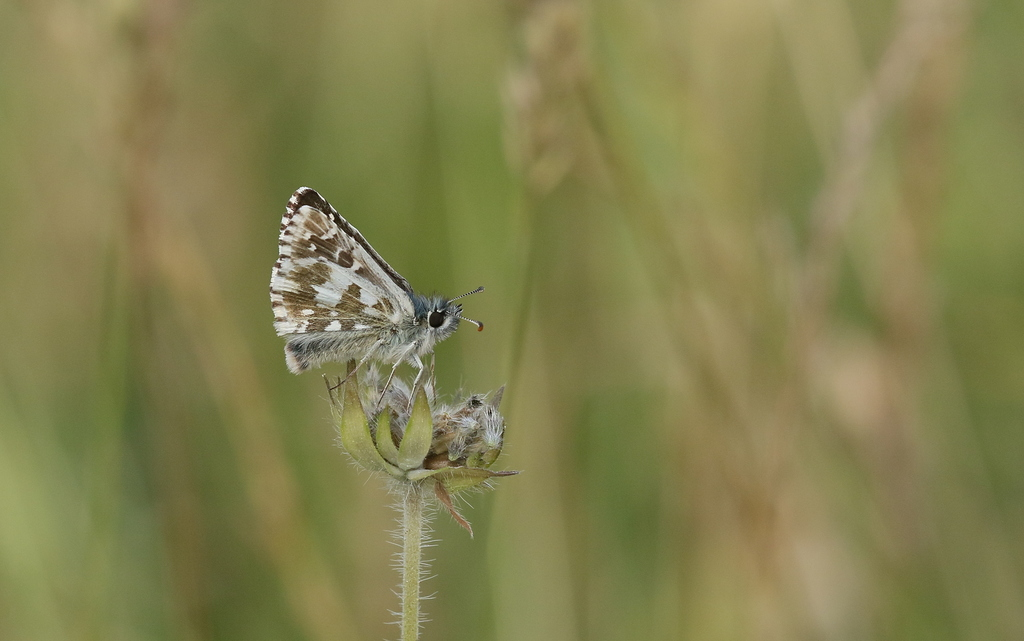
Large Grizzled Skipper (Pyrgus alveus), Mittenwald, Bavaria, Germany, June 2019

Pyrgus alveus agg. is similar to Pyrgus warrenensis and Pyrgus armoricanus. These two species already show macromorphological differences to Pyrgus alveus / Pyrgus trebevicensis, in particular the latter are on average larger. A genital morphological determination is nevertheless recommended and in areas with syntopic occurrences inevitable.

== Range ==
The species complex Pyrgus alveus agg. is distributed from northwest Africa over the mountains of the Iberian Peninsula and southern Europe (Apennines and Balkan Peninsula) as well as across western, central (to the southern North German Plain) and Eastern Europe to Transbaikalia. In Northern Europe only the southern part of Fennoscandia is populated. In the southeast the area extends over Anatolia to the Caucasus. It is absent from Denmark and practically all European islands including Great Britain, Ireland, Azores, Balearic Islands, Channel Islands, Canary Islands, Crete, Cyprus, Iceland, etc.

== Habitat ==
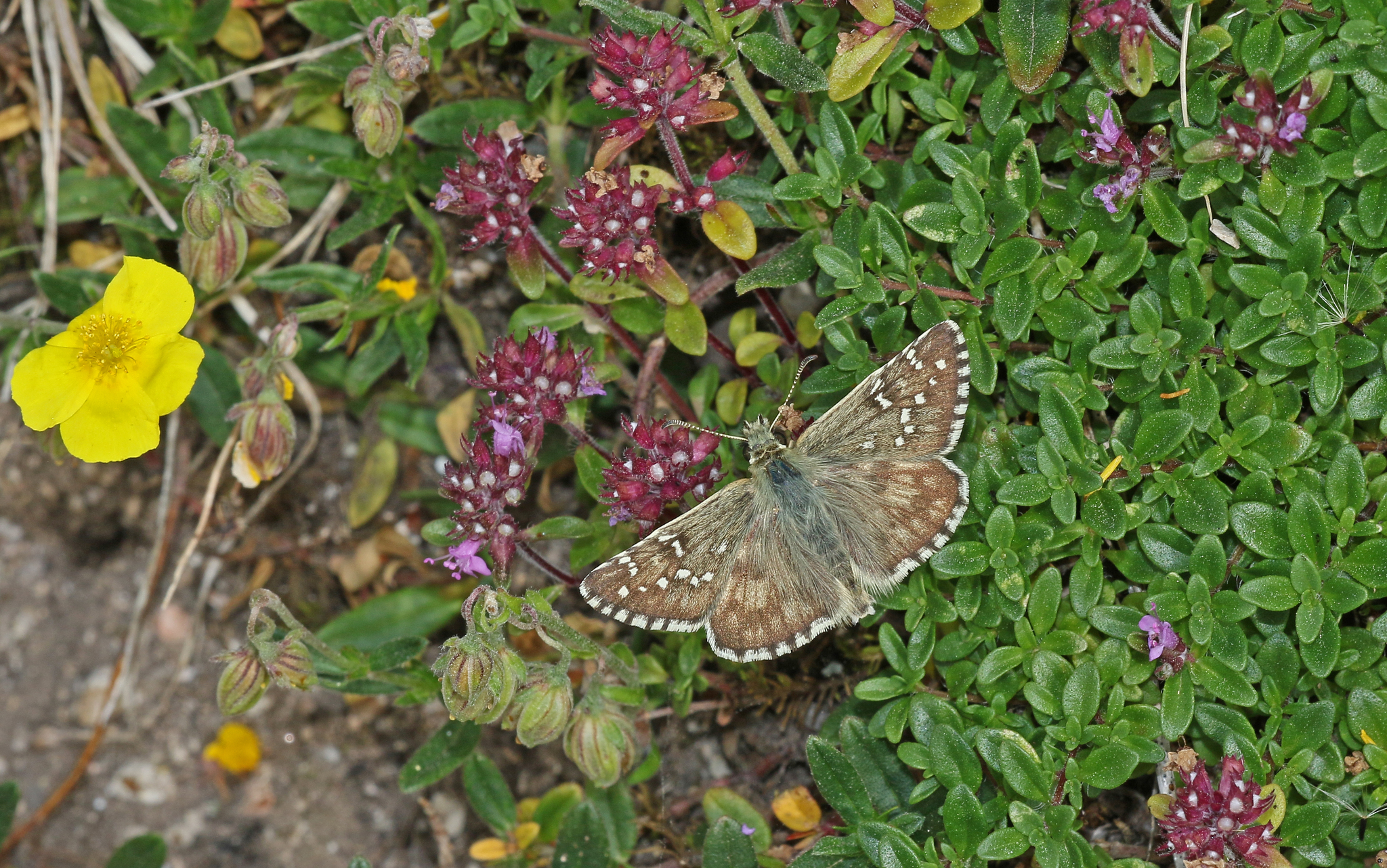
Large Grizzled Skipper (Pyrgus alveus), Ostallgäu, Bavaria, Germany, June 2021

Populations of the species complex Pyrgus alveus agg. are mainly bound to limestone grasslands, which represent the habitats in the main distribution areas of the Franconian Jura. The populations in the Bavarian Alps populate limestone grasslands, alpine grasslands and lean alpine pastures. Sand grasslands are also occupied locally, for example in the foothills of the Middle Franconian Jura and the Danube-Isar hill country. The occurrences in the Mittelvogtland hill country also settled on silicate grasslands. All of these are poor locations that, with the exception of occurrences in the Alps, are usually grazed regularly and have a correspondingly short-grass structure.

== Ecology ==
The phenology of Pyrgus alveus agg. covers a period of four months in Bavaria. This applies to both the alpine and extra-alpine regions of Bavaria and corresponds to an only slightly shorter period of time, as is also known from the Swabian Alb in Baden-Württemberg. The flight period starts in mid-May and ends in mid-September. Despite the long period in which imagos can be observed, according to the current state of knowledge, Pyrgus alveus agg. only forms one generation per year in central Europe. The long development time of the caterpillars also speaks against a second annual generation. The flight times vary due to the wide range of elevations in the Alps.

The altitude distribution extends from the colline level at almost 300 m in the Grabfeldgau and the Haßberge in northwest Bavaria to the alpine zone at 2100 m in the Allgäu high Alps. The focus of the records is between 350 m and 500 m, which is mainly due to the extra-alpine occurrences in the Franconian Alb. The occurrences in the Alps spread over a wide area of almost 700–2100 m, a less pronounced focus concerns the altitude between 1000 m and 1400 m.

Oviposition of Pyrgus alveus agg. has been ovserved on Potentilla verna agg. and Helianthemum nummularium in Bavaria. Here caterpillars were only found on Potentilla verna agg. From the Swabian Alb (Baden-Württemberg) and Switzerland, only Helianthemum nummularium is mentioned as an egg-laying and larval food plant. For Thuringia, Saxony and Lower Saxony, however, Potentilla species are given as oviposition or host plants. Potentilla argentea agg. is another potential food plant that was found to be used in Saxony and potentially in Bavaria in sand and silicate grasslands. Other cinquefoil species found on dry, poor grassland must also be considered potential host plants.

The eggs are laid usually on the lower, and occasionally also on the upper side, of the leaves of the host plant. For this purpose, patchy and heavily sunlit locations are sought out. Large cushions of spring cinquefoil, usually over a pronounced layer of moss, are also used. The caterpillars live in a web or in the typical Pyrgus leaf bags, which are newly created after a molt. The prerequisites for a population are habitats with frequent occurrence of host plants, which are grazed regularly, mostly by sheep. Exceptions to this are mown heaths in the north of Munich. In the Alps, on the other hand, it is mostly cattle pastures. A minimum size of three hectares of habitat is assumed for the Swabian Alb, which, however, must be viewed as the lowest limit. The population densities fluctuate, often from year to year, sometimes very strongly.

Both sexes of Pyrgus alveus agg. are extensive flower visitors and suck nectar from numerous different plant species. The males also use moist soil to absorb liquid. The overwintering takes place in different caterpillar stages.

== Conservation ==
The populations of Pyrgus alveus agg. are, with the exception of the high altitudes of the Alps, dependent on larger and regularly grazed grasslands. The central element for the preservation and promotion of the species complex is therefore the maintenance or reintroduction of herding sheep farming as well as extensive cattle grazing on lean sites. This is especially true for the main habitat type limestone grasslands. Pyrgus alveus agg. shows itself to be very tolerant of pasture, also to more intensive grazing with high frequency and heavy browsing. Lean grasslands that are regularly grazed several times a year and are therefore short-grassed are characterized by favorable habitat structures and correspondingly rich populations. An exception to this are the heaths in the north of Munich, which have been mowed regularly for decades, but which used to be grazed. In regions with an already strong decline in populations and only small-scale habitats, it is necessary to enlarge the remaining poor grassland through clearing, clearing, etc. with subsequent grazing.

== Etymology ==
"Latin game board."

== Taxonomy ==
In order to investigate whether the Pyrgus alveus agg. species complex can be reliably differentiated by molecular biological characteristics, investigations of butterfly samples via "DNA barcoding" were started. The results show a complex pattern of diverse, extremely closely related genetic lines. They surround each other and are many times more similar than the differences between other Pyrgus species outside the Pyrgus alveus complex. These differences do not correlate or only partially correlate with genital morphological features. For a final taxonomic assessment, however, extensive further studies including further markers and paleobiogeographical analyzes are necessary.

Synonyms:

• Hesperia scandinavicus Strand, 1903

• Hesperia alticola Rebel, 1909

• Syrichthus ballotae Oberthür, 1910

• Hesperia centralitaliae Verity, 1920

• Hesperia accreta Verity, 1925

• Hesperia trebevicensis Warren, 1926
