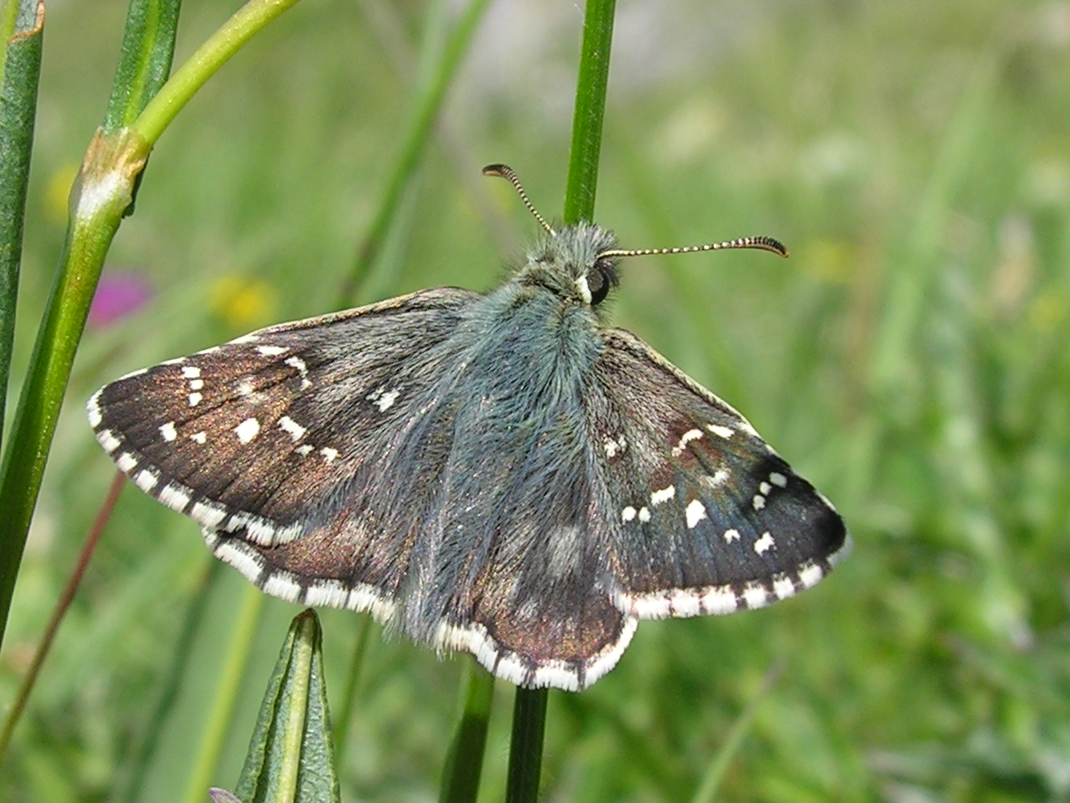

Scientific classification
- Kingdom: Animalia
- Phylum: Arthropoda
- Class: Insecta
- Order: Lepidoptera
- Family: Hesperiidae
- Genus: Pyrgus
- Species: P. serratulae

Binomial name
- Pyrgus serratulae (Rambur, 1839)

= Olive skipper =

Species of skipper butterfly genus Pyrgus

The Olive Skipper (Pyrgus serratulae) is a species of skipper (family Hesperiidae).

== Description ==
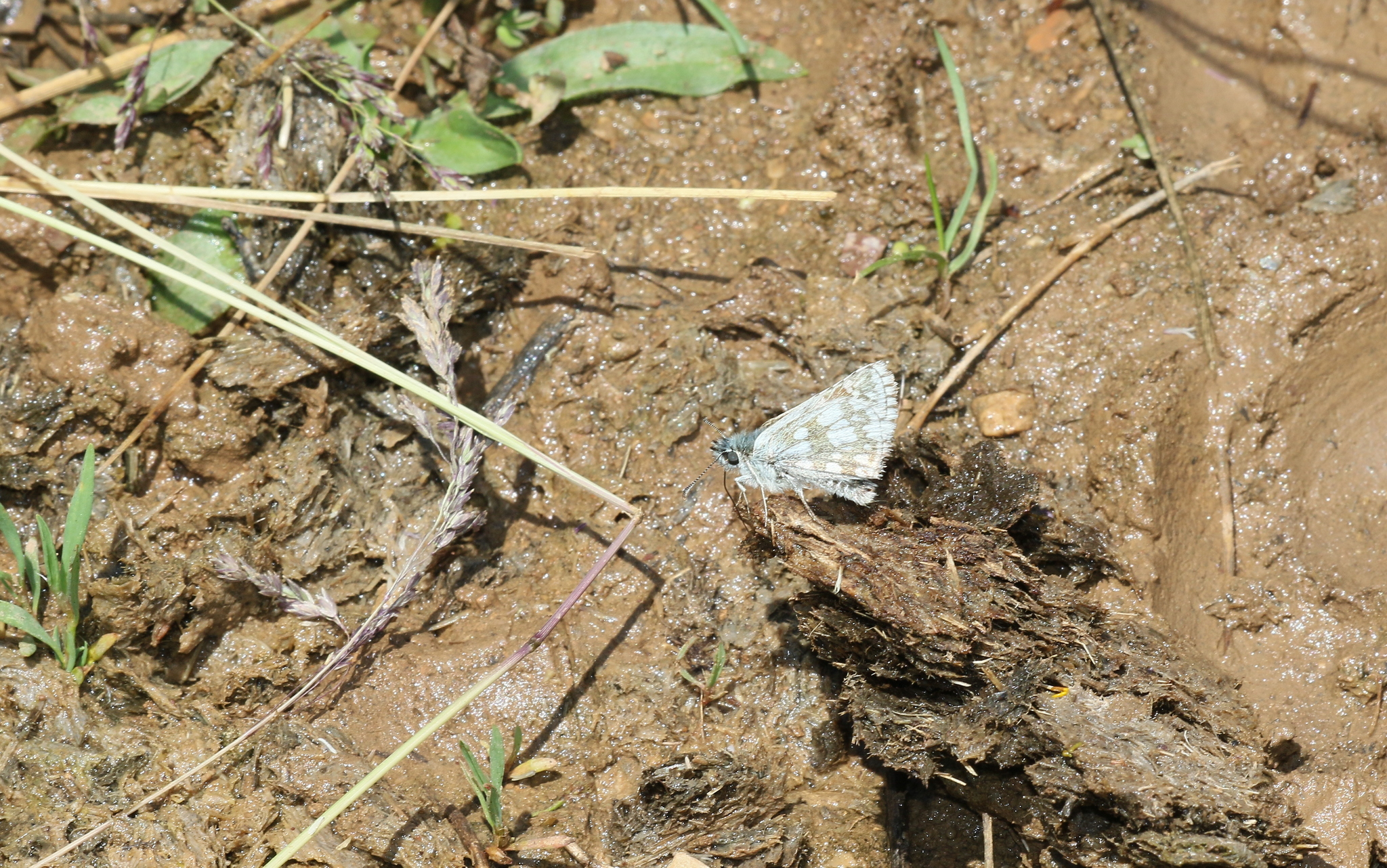
Olive Skipper (Pyrgus serratulae), West Greece, July 2020

This is a relatively distinctive species by the standards of the genus, the upperside tending to be plainer than most of its congeners with only tiny white marks on the forewings and almost unmarked on the hindwings. The underside is usually mostly olive-green with paler markings. An oval basal spot on the underside of the hind wing is a mostly well-developed feature. Alpine individuals often have a strong, almost completely reduced pattern of bright points on the upper side of the wing. The wingspan is 24–28 mm which means that Pyrgus serratulae is a medium-sized Pyrgus species. Basically, there is a great possibility of confusion with butterflies of the Pyrgus alveus complex, which can also occur syntopically with P. serratulae, as well as the other species of the genus Pyrgus. Safe separation is possible through the genitals.

== Range ==
It is a species of the mountainous areas of Europe but is absent from the British Isles and Scandinavia. P. serratulae is distributed from the southern European mountains through western, central and eastern Europe via south-western Siberia to Mongolia and northern China. In addition, Asia Minor, Transcaucasia as far as north-west Iran and north-east Iraq are populated. In north-west Germany the occurrences reach as far as East Westphalia and in north-east Germany to the vicinity of the Baltic Sea.

== Habitat ==
Habitats are limestone grasslands or alpine grasslands in shallow and often rock-interspersed locations as well as rock corridors on mostly alkaline rocks. Avalanche tracks and erosion channels are often occupied in the Alps. In addition, the species is also found in Nardus stricta dominated grasslands.

== Ecology ==
The adults are on the wing in July and August. The phenology of Pyrgus serratulae differs over a long period of time due to its wide altitude distribution. While the flight time in the Alps begins from mid-June (in above-average warm springs from the beginning of June) with the peak in July and numerous records still in August to the beginning of September, the imagos appear in the lower elevations of northern Bavaria a month earlier, usually in May (in very warm springs from the end of April) with a focus on June. The last imagos can be found in some years until the end of July.

The imagos of Pyrgus serratulae obviously orient themselves optically on smaller or larger rocks, rock edges or banks or on other open ground structures. The oviposition takes place in very gappy or vegetation-poor locations, usually on individually standing cinquefoil plants. Proven caterpillar forage plants are Potentilla tabernaemontani [= Potentilla neumanniana, Potentilla verna], Potentilla heptaphylla, Potentilla recta, Potentilla aurea, Potentilla crantzii, Potentilla hirta, Potentilla pusilla, Potentilla reptans, Sibbaldia montanumbens and Heliantum reptanumbens. The eggs are deposited individually on the underside of the leaves. As the oviposition observations and caterpillar finds show, larval development takes place in full sun and quickly warming locations. Cinquefoil plants on or immediately next to rocks are often used. Furthermore, open locations with little vegetation with a rocky-gritty soil matrix or along unpaved paths are used for larval development. The caterpillars spin the typical Pyrgus leaf bags. The most important food plant in the extra-alpine area is the species group Potentilla verna agg. While so far only a few egg-laying observations have been made on Potentilla erecta.

In the Swabian Alb, Potentilla heptaphylla is preferred over Potentilla verna. In the Alps, in particular, other Potentilla species should be considered as caterpillar food. The northern Bavarian caterpillars overwinter in the penultimate caterpillar stadium and can already be found adult in April. A longer-range in larval development can possibly be expected in the Alps.

The males of Pyrgus serratulae like to suckle on moist ground as well as on sweat. When visiting flowers, the imagos are opportunistic and visit flowers from several families and with different colors.

== Conservation ==
In the Alps, no special protective measures currently appear necessary. The preservation of the extra-alpine occurrences, on the other hand, is heavily dependent on maintenance measures such as rock clearing and regular grazing or clearing to keep the limestone grasslands open. For this purpose, steep rock heaths, as well as shallow and rock-interspersed grasslands, are to be integrated.

== Etymology ==
"Serratula" As with most Pyrgus species, the plant genus mentioned in the species name has nothing to do with the caterpillar's diet.
