= Cacalia =

Rejected genus of flowering plants

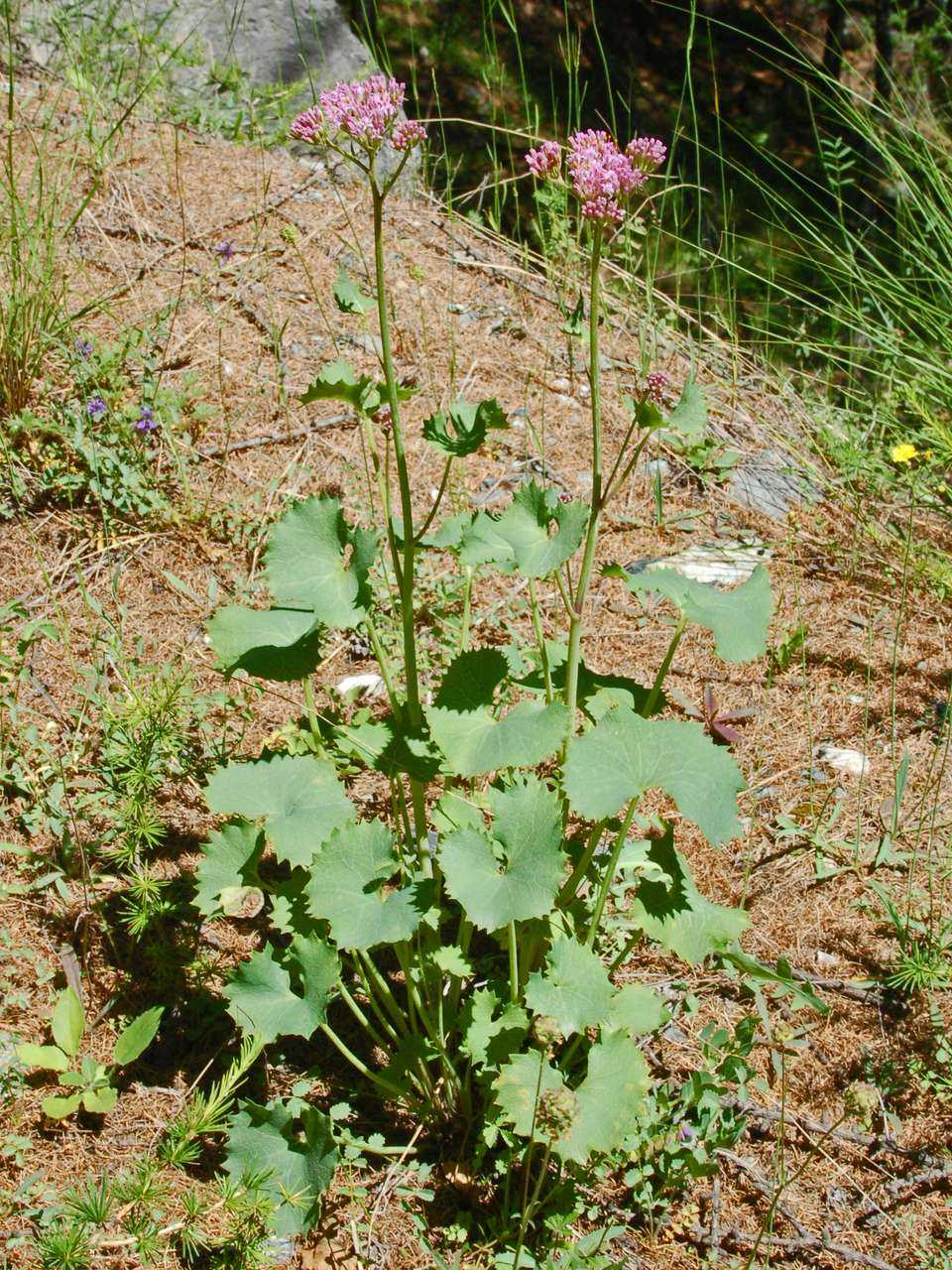
Adenostyles alpina (formerly Cacalia alpina)

The genus Cacalia L. is a nomen rejiciendum (rejected name) under the International Code of Nomenclature for algae, fungi, and plants. The type species C. alpina L. has been transferred to Adenostyles alpina (L.) Bluff & Fingerh., and the former species of Cacalia now reside in a few different genera.

Adenostyles

- Adenostyles alliariae (Gouan) A. Kern.
  - Cacalia alliariae Gouan
- Adenostyles alpina (L.) Bluff & Fingerh.
  - Cacalia alpina L.
- Adenostyles briquetii Gamisans
  - Cacalia briquetii (Gamisans) Gamisans
- Adenostyles leucophylla (Willd.) Rchb.
  - Cacalia leucophylla Willd.

Arnoglossum

- Arnoglossum atriplicifolium (L.) H.Rob. - Pale Indian Plantain
  - Cacalia atriplicifolia L.
  - Cacalia rotundifolia (Raf.) House
- Arnoglossum diversifolium (Torr. & Gray) H.Rob. - Variable-leaved Indian Plantain
  - Cacalia diversifolia Torr. & Gray
- Arnoglossum floridanum (Gray) H.Rob. - Florida cacalia
  - Cacalia floridana Gray
- Arnoglossum muehlenbergii (Sch.Bip.) H.Rob. - Great Indian Plantain
  - Cacalia muehlenbergii (Schultz-Bip.) Fern.
  - Cacalia reniformis Muhl. ex Willd., non Lam.
- Arnoglossum ovatum (Walter) H.Rob. - Ovateleaf cacalia
  - Cacalia elliottii (Harper) Shinners
  - Cacalia lanceolata Nutt.
  - Cacalia ovata Walt.
  - Cacalia tuberosa Nutt.
- Arnoglossum sulcatum (Fernald) H.Rob - Georgia Indian plaintain
  - Cacalia sulcata Fern.
