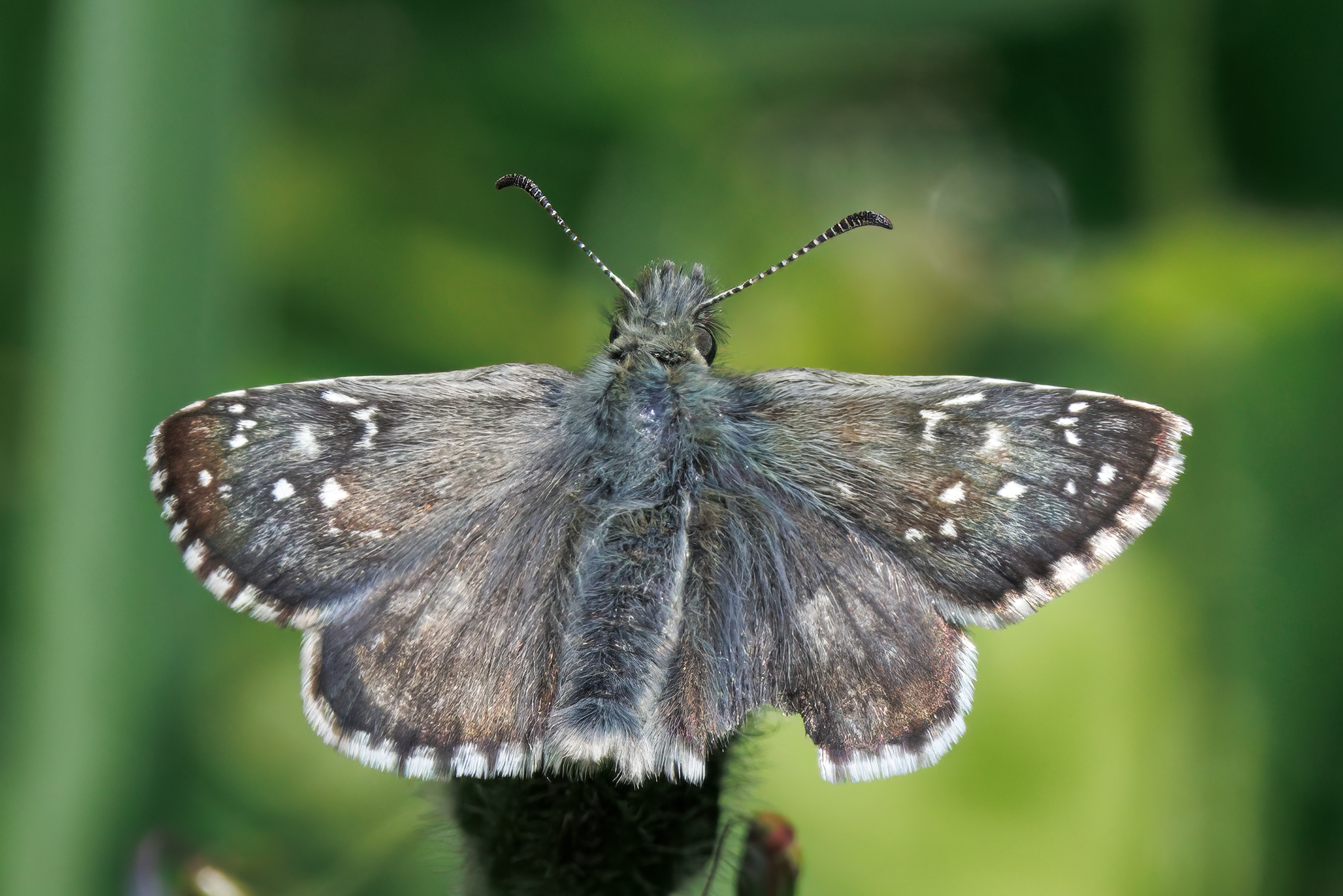
- Male, Switzerland
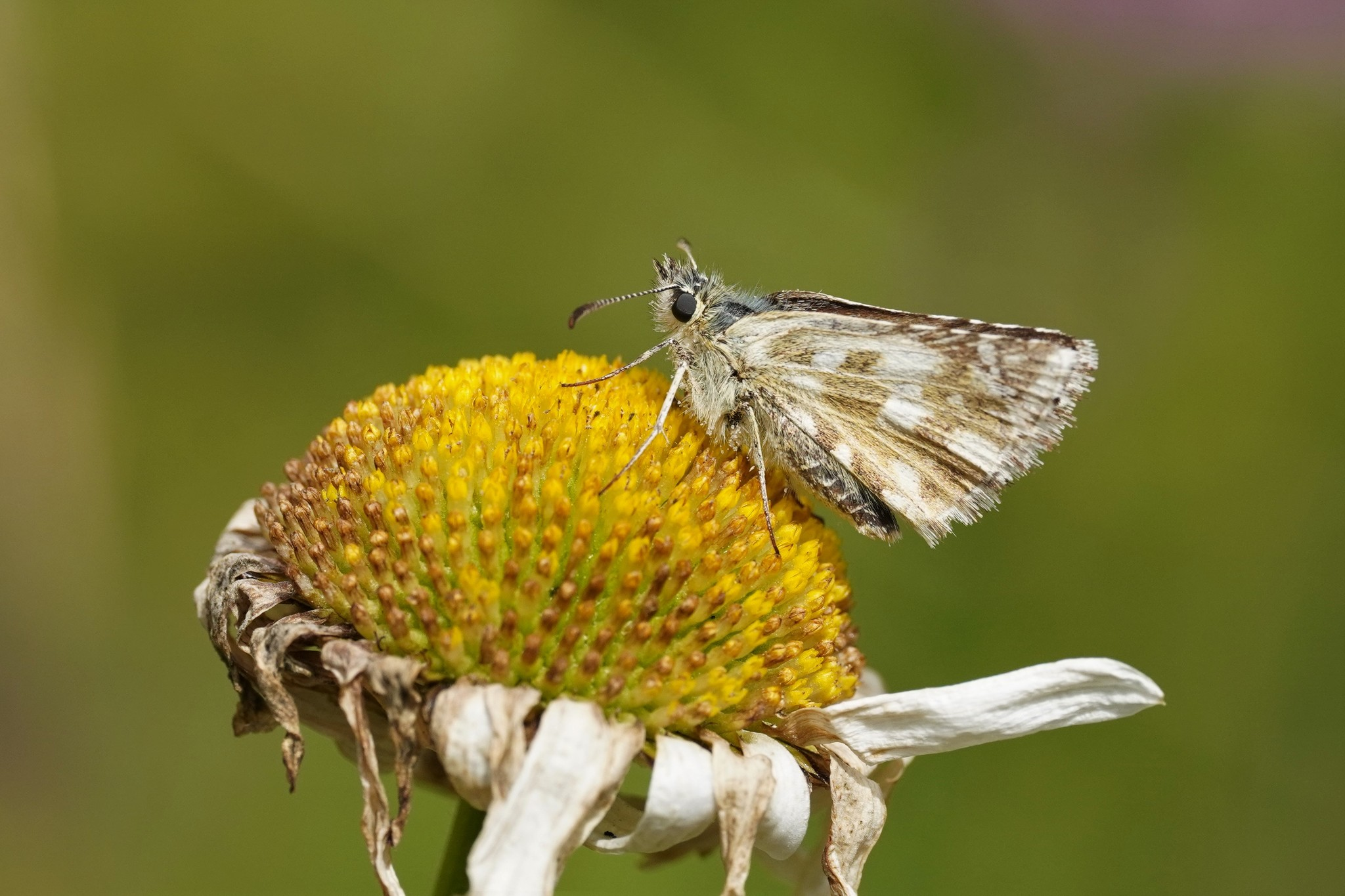

Scientific classification
- Kingdom: Animalia
- Phylum: Arthropoda
- Class: Insecta
- Order: Lepidoptera
- Family: Hesperiidae
- Genus: Pyrgus
- Species: P. cacaliae

Binomial name
- Pyrgus cacaliae (Rambur, 1839)

= Dusky grizzled skipper =

Species of skipper butterfly genus Pyrgus

The dusky grizzled skipper (Pyrgus cacaliae) is a species of skipper butterfly (family Hesperiidae).

== Description ==
Pyrgus cacaliae is comparatively large and the white spots on the upper side of the forewing are greatly reduced. The hind wing underside has a faded olive-green color with a long and a short point on the inner edge (similar to an exclamation mark). This feature also shows Pyrgus andromedae, but in Pyrgus cacaliae it does not stand out so clearly from the subsurface. Also the Alpine grizzled skipper is usually encountered at lower altitudes. It can also be distinguished by the smaller, fainter pale markings on the forewing and the less bold markings on the underwing. In cases of doubt, a genital examination is essential for a reliable determination. Both sexes have the same markings, but the males are slightly darker in color.

The caterpillar is usually dark in color with a darker topline. In ex ovo breeding, clay-yellow colored caterpillars were often observed in the last two stages. The head shield is black. The head and wing sheaths of the pupa are bluish with frosting; in the case of the abdomen, which is brown in its basic color, only the segment boundaries are left out. The ventral side has a distinctive drawing, consisting of a black central bar and each side of which consists of two black dots. The back side also shows black dots and lines. The dorsal cremaster is red-brown in color.

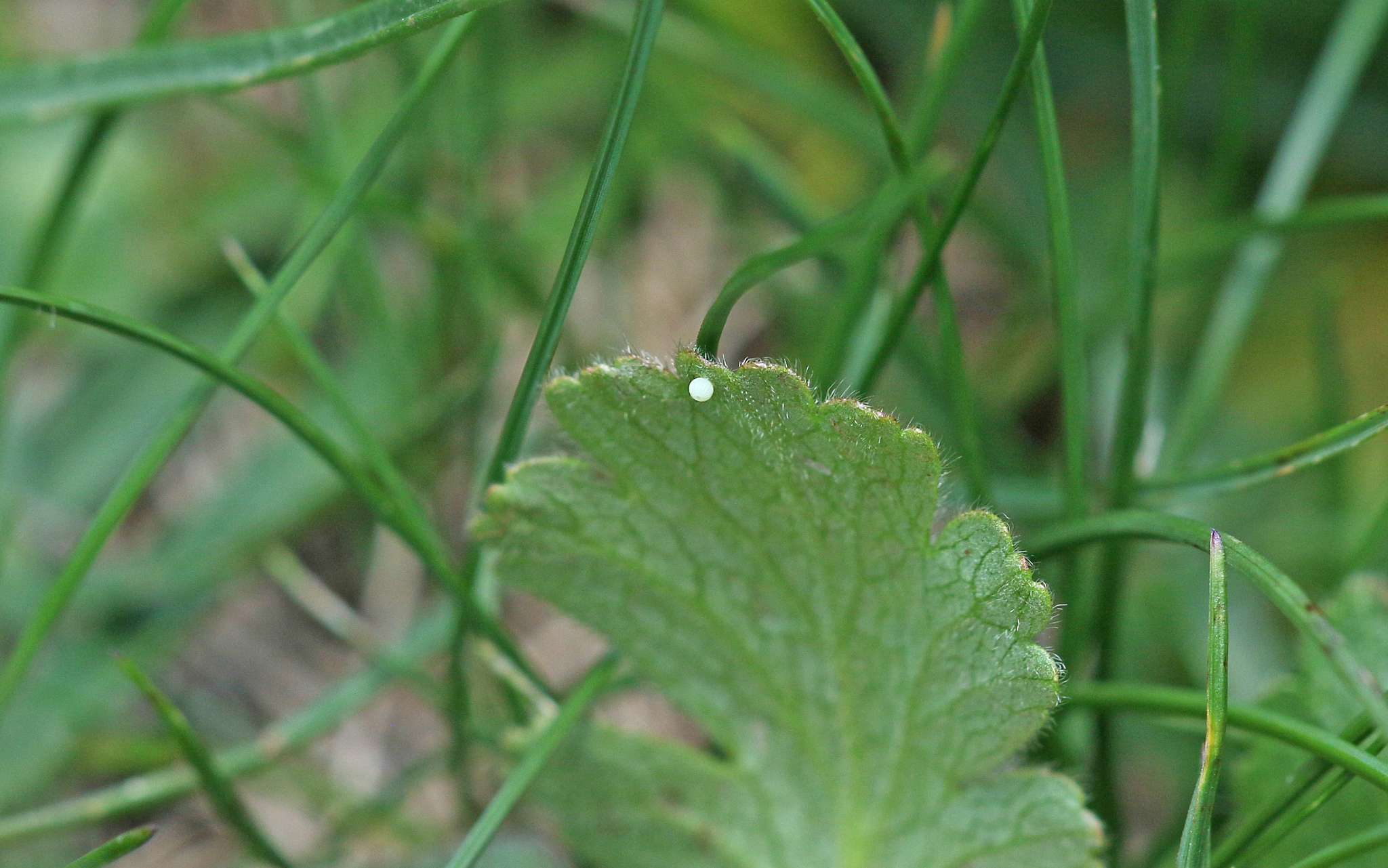
Egg, Verbano-Cusio-Ossola, Piemonte, Italy

== Range ==
The species is widespread in the Central Pyrenees and from the western to the eastern Alps (from France to Italy, Switzerland, Germany and Austria). In addition, Pyrgus cacaliae occurs in the Balkans in the Dinaric Mountains of Bosnia-Herzegovina, in the Central Carpathians of Romania and in the Rila, Pirin and Stara Planina Mountains of Bulgaria.

== Habitat ==
On the one hand, Pyrgus cacaliae colonizes humid habitats such as rye bushes along streams, peatlands and springs. On the other hand, there is evidence from dry alpine lawns, mostly interlocking with rock debris. In the Alps, the maximum distribution is between 1700 and 2500 meters above sea level. In Bavaria this species is recorded at altitudes of 1500–2300 m.

== Ecology ==
The flight period in the Bavarian Alpine region extends from the end of June to the beginning of August. Pyrgus cacaliae can be detected in both even and odd years.

According to observations from Switzerland and Austria, the eggs are laid individually on the underside of the leaves of the host plants: Potentilla erecta, Potentilla crantzii and Potentilla aurea. The wintering was observed in Switzerland as a caterpillar in the penultimate stage. Other observations show that after an egg rest of eleven days, the caterpillars hatch, only eat plants for a few days and then prepare for wintering. Observations from the Rätikon and Silvretta areas in Austria show a two-year development cycle with the first wintering in the first larval stage and a second wintering in the last larval or pupal stage. Imagos can be found every year due to a partial third hibernation.

== Conservation ==
According to the current state of knowledge, the species is not endangered in the Alps, as the occurrence of Pyrgus cacaliae is mostly outside of agricultural areas or on extensively grazed mountain pastures.

== Etymology ==
"Cacalia, in German Roßlattich". "Roßlattich" is now mostly regarded as one of many German names for Tussilago farfara. Originally, Adenostyles alpina [= Cacalia alpina, Tussilago cacalia] was very probably meant here. As with most Pyrgus species, it has nothing to do with the food of the caterpillar.
