= Blue sedge =

Blue sedge is a common name for several plants and may refer to:

- Carex firma, certain cultivars are known as blue sedge
- Carex flacca (syn. Carex glauca), native to Europe and North Africa, and cultivated as an ornamental
- Carex glaucodea, known as blue wood sedge
- Carex glaucodes, native to eastern North America
