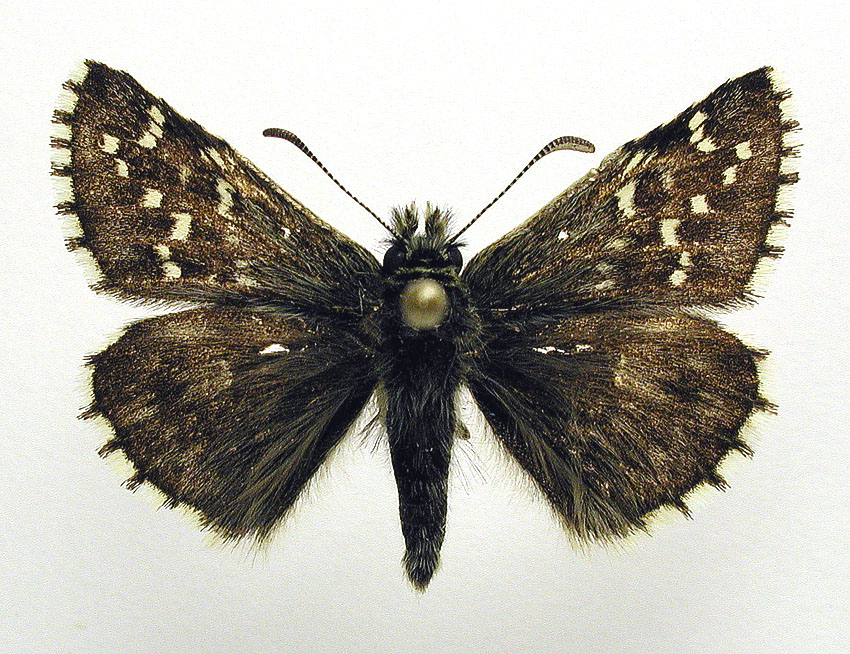

Conservation status
- Least Concern (IUCN 3.1)

Scientific classification
- Kingdom: Animalia
- Phylum: Arthropoda
- Class: Insecta
- Order: Lepidoptera
- Family: Hesperiidae
- Genus: Pyrgus
- Species: P. andromedae

Binomial name
- Pyrgus andromedae (Wallengren, 1853)

= Alpine grizzled skipper =

Species of skipper butterfly genus Pyrgus

The Alpine Grizzled Skipper (Pyrgus andromedae) is a species of skipper (family Hesperiidae).

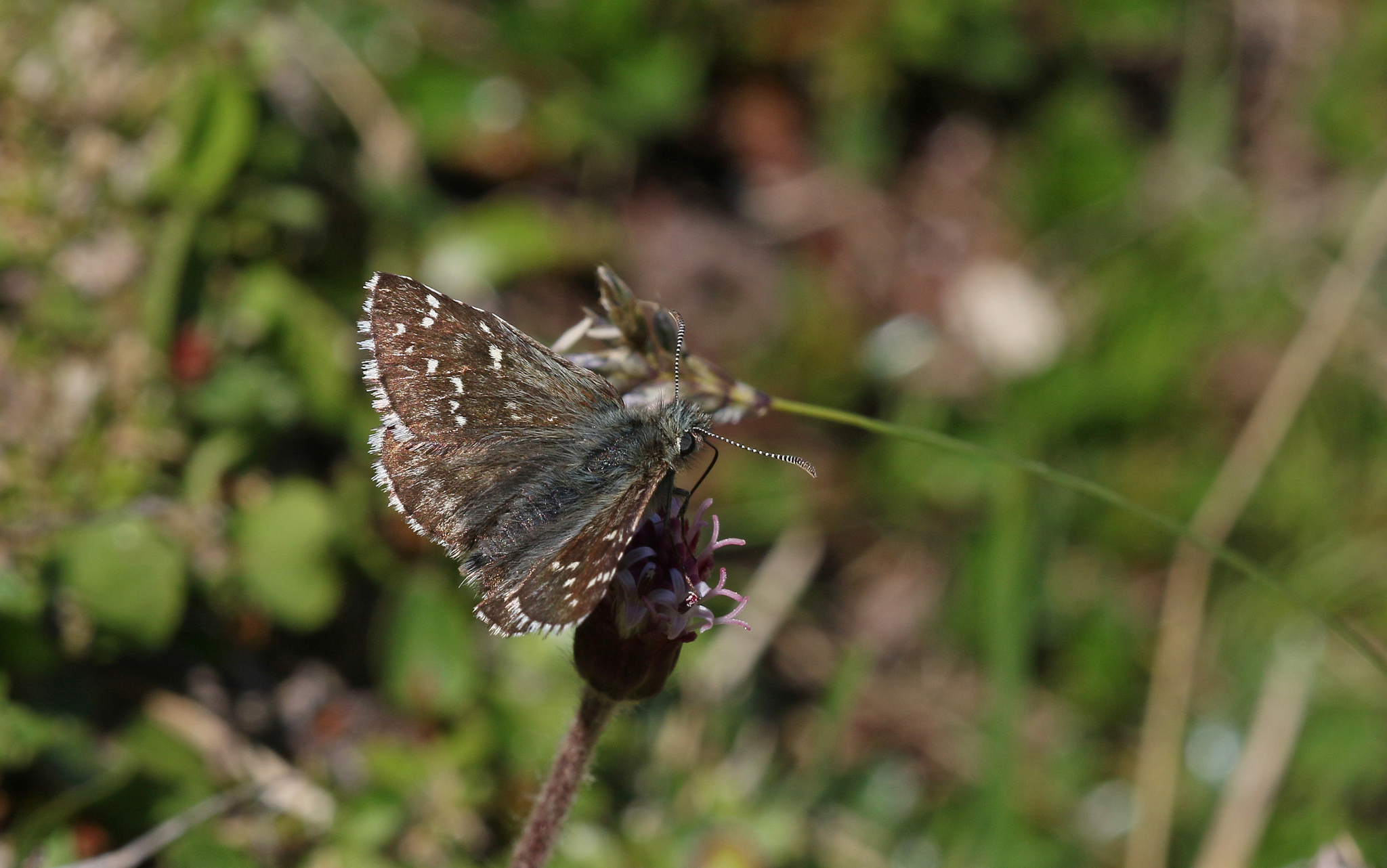
Alpine Grizzled Skipper (Pyrgus andromedae), Mittenwald, Germany, June 2019

== Description ==
This is a medium-sized Pyrgus skipper with a wingspan of 26–30 mm. The dark brown forewing is marked with a bold pattern of white spots; by contrast the hindwing is plain dark brown with little or no patterning. The underside of the hindwing has two distinctive pale markings close to the dorsum: an elongated streak and a round spot, often likened to an exclamation mark (!). In cases of doubt, an examination of the genitals should be carried out for a reliable determination.

== Range ==
The Alpine Grizzled Skipper is the only boreo-alpine Pyrgus species in Europe. It is found at high altitudes in Europe. This species is found up to fairly high altitudes in the Alps, Pyrenees (rare) and Pirin and also at lower elevations in northern Scandinavia, where its range extends well into the Arctic Circle. It is also known from the Carpathians, southwest Bosnia, southwest Serbia, northwest North Macedonia, Lapland and the border between Norway and Sweden. This is a European endemic species.

== Habitat ==
In the Alps and Pyrenees, its natural habitat is above the tree line in damp, grassy places, often near streams or in bogs. In its Scandinavian range it occurs in areas with dwarf scrubby vegetation and on steep slopes and in rocky areas. It prefers damp habitats and is often found near to water. The main occurrences of P. andromedae are in the Alps in the Sesleria caerulea and Carex firma-dominated grasslands of calcareous locations at the alpine altitude. In low altitudes below 800 m, gravel banks in the alluvial areas of mountain rivers and their peripheral areas are usually occupied. Habitats in the subalpine level are light mountain forests interspersed with poor grass, stony and poor alpine pastures, avalanche lines, rubble heaps, brook banks, feistluras or embankments with pioneer lawns created by road construction.

In the Swiss Alps its height range is 1,000 to 2,700 metres (3,300 to 8,900 ft) and in the Pyrenees 1,500 to 2,000 metres (4,900 to 6,600 ft). In Bavaria the species can usually be found at an altitude range of 900 m to 2000 m.

== Ecology ==
P. andromedae occurs in one generation per year throughout its range. The first imagos were observed in Bavaria from mid-May. The main flight time falls from the beginning of June to mid-July, from the first week of August there is only a very small amount of evidence. The phenology is strongly dependent on the spring weather in the mountains. After winters with little snow and extremely warm springs, the phenological maximum was already reached at the end of May. In Bavaria, significantly more individuals have been observed in odd years than in even years.

P. andromedae has a rapid flight, low over the ground. The imagos use various plants as sources of nectar and can also be found in subalpine tall herbaceous meadows, fatty willows or spring swamps when visiting flowers. They use stones, open soil or exposed leaves as seats. The males move into territories to find a partner, preferably on the banks of a stream or in tall herbaceous meadows.

For reproduction, P. andromedae needs well-sunlit stands of Dryas octopetala, which is probably the only host plant. This mainly grows on shallow, humus-poor, base-rich stone and rock soils and is also considered a pioneer species of dormant rock rubble heaps. To lay eggs, the female looks for a suitable leaf with a curved abdomen and attaches the egg individually to the underside of the leaf. The great importance of Dryas octopetala as an egg-laying and host plant for P. andromedae was only recognized recently. For a long time, incorrect information about egg-laying and host plants such as cinquefoil species (Potentilla spp.) was spread, as the pre-imaginal stages or the imagos were probably confused with those of other Pyrgus species (especially Pyrgus cacaliae). The information on mallow (Malva spp.) or Alchemilla spp. is also unreliable. In Bavaria, eggs were laid from mid-June to the end of July on the heavily sunlit Dryas octopetala cushions in rock-strewn terrain.

The eggs are laid individually. The caterpillars spin a silken web and anchor leaves together to make a shelter in which they congregate. They hibernate over winter and pupate in a similar shelter the following spring. A two-year development cycle was observed in the Rätikon (Vorarlberg) above 2000 m. The caterpillar of the first larval stage only eats for a few days and then makes a housing on the leaves of the host plant for the first hibernation, a second hibernation takes place in the pupal stage. When breeding in the lowlands, the caterpillar develops directly into the pupa, which then overwinters. There are also breeding observations, according to which the caterpillars grow at different speeds, so that some overwintered in the second caterpillar stage, another part already overwintered as a pupa.

== Conservation ==
Although some populations of Alpine Grizzled Skipper are in decline (especially in Austria) the IUCN lists the species as being of "least concern" as there are no identifiable threats to it at a continent-wide level. The occurrences are mostly on extensively used alpine pastures or in difficult to access, hardly influenced mountain areas. As for other open land species, in the high-montane and sub-alpine areas, the preservation of extensive pasture use (alpine farming) is a safeguard for the future.

== Etymology ==
"Andromeda" means Andromeda polifolia. As with most Pyrgus species, the species name has nothing to do with the food the caterpillars eat.
