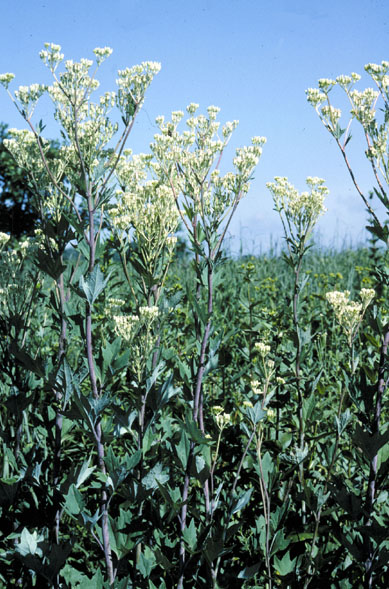
- Arnoglossum atriplicifolium

Scientific classification
- Kingdom: Plantae
- Clade: Tracheophytes
- Clade: Angiosperms
- Clade: Eudicots
- Clade: Asterids
- Order: Asterales
- Family: Asteraceae
- Subfamily: Asteroideae
- Tribe: Senecioneae
- Genus: Arnoglossum; Raf. 1817 not Gray 1821 (syn of Plantago in Plantaginaceae)

Synonyms
- Conophora (de Candolle) Nieuwland; Mesadenia Rafinesque

= Arnoglossum =

Genus of flowering plants

Arnoglossum is a North American genus of plants in the family Asteraceae, described as a genus in 1817. They have the common name Indian plantain because they resemble the unrelated common plantain (Plantago spp.).

Arnoglossum is a member of the tribe Senecioneae which has been undergoing extensive revisions in recent years. Many of the species now in the genus were formerly classified in other genera such as Cacalia, Mesadenia, and Senecio. The remaining species are all native to North America (Ontario and eastern United States).

The name Arnoglossum is from the Greek word "arnos" meaning lamb, and "glossum" meaning tongue and is the ancient name for some species of Plantago.

Species

- Arnoglossum album L.C.Anderson - Florida
- Arnoglossum atriplicifolium (L.)H.Rob. - pale Indian plantain - much of eastern + central USA
- Arnoglossum diversifolium (Torr. & A.Gray) H.Rob. - variable-leaved Indian plantain - Georgia, Florida, Alabama
- Arnoglossum floridanum (A.Gray) H.Rob. - Florida cacalia - Florida
- Arnoglossum ovatum (Walter) H.Rob. - Ovateleaf cacalia - from eastern Texas to North Carolina
- Arnoglossum plantagineum Raf. - tuberous Indian-plantain or groovestem Indian plaintain - from Ontario south as far as Texas and Alabama
- Arnoglossum reniforme (Hook.) H.E. Robins. - eastern USA
- Arnoglossum sulcatum (Fernald) H.Rob - Georgia Indian plaintain - Georgia, Florida, Alabama, Mississippi
