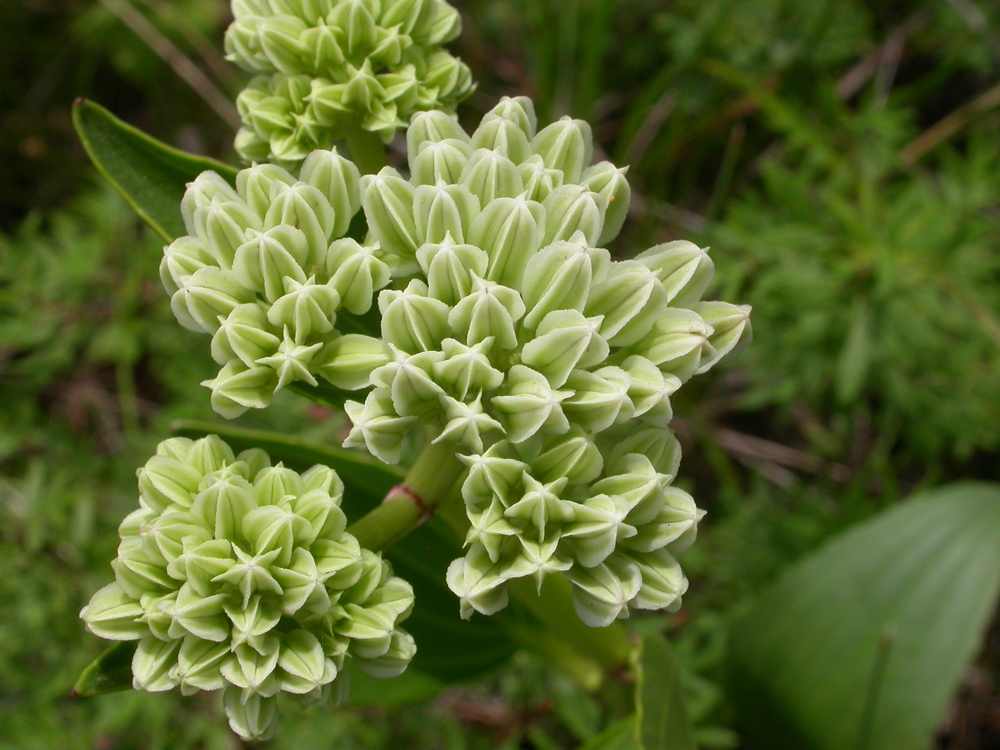

Scientific classification
- Kingdom: Plantae
- Clade: Tracheophytes
- Clade: Angiosperms
- Clade: Eudicots
- Clade: Asterids
- Order: Asterales
- Family: Asteraceae
- Genus: Arnoglossum
- Species: A. plantagineum

Binomial name
- Arnoglossum plantagineum Raf.

Synonyms
- Cacalia plantaginea (Raf.) Shinners; Cacalia pteranthes Raf.; Cacalia tuberosa Nutt.; Conophora tuberosa (Nutt.) Nieuwl.; Mesadenia plantaginea (Raf.) Raf.; Mesadenia tuberosa (Nutt.) Britton ex Britton; Senecio nuttallii Sch.Bip.

= Arnoglossum plantagineum =

Species of flowering plant

Arnoglossum plantagineum also known as tuberous Indian-plantain, groovestem Indian plantain or prairie Indian plantain, is a North American species of Arnoglossum in the sunflower family. The Latin specific epithet plantagineum refers to the leaves of the plant which are similar to those of a plantain.

== Description ==
Arnoglossum plantagineum is a large herbaceous perennial up to 100 cm (40 inches) tall, spreading weakly using underground rhizomes. Non-flowering plants have ovate to oval-shaped leaves that are 17 cm wide with long petioles and five to seven nearly parallel veins. On flowering plants, the erect, unbranched stems are angled and grooved and hairless. The leaves become smaller as they progress to the top of the stem and the leaf blades are more broadly egg-shaped with more coarse teethed margins and have shorter stalks. The flowerheads are white or greenish, with typically five flowers per head, the heads are collected together into a branched, flat-topped, inflorescence. The flower involucre typically has five phyllaries arranged in a single row. The ripe seeds (cypselae) are dark brown and fusiform or clavate in shape, and 4–5 mm long, and have from 12 to 15-ribs. The seed pappi are (6–)7–8(–9) mm long. 2n = 54

== Habitat ==
Arnoglossum plantagineum grows in sunny areas with moist to wet soils in wet and mesic prairie, fens, and sedge meadows, and seems to have little tolerance for disturbed habitats such as those grazed by cattle, sprayed with herbicides, or those subject repeated haying. In Minnesota it is found with other declining plants species such as Asclepias sulliavantii and Parthenium integrfolium.

== Distribution ==
Arnoglossum plantagineum is native to the Central United States (Great Lakes, Mississippi Valley, southeastern Great Plains, from Texas east to Alabama and north to Minnesota and Michigan), with additional populations in the Canadian Province of Ontario.

In the US states of Minnesota and Wisconsin, tuberous Indian-plantain is listed as a threatened species, and the state of Tennessee lists it as a species of special concern. In Minnesota the species was relatively common in the southeastern part of the state until recently, when much of its native habitat was converted to farmland, and now is found in isolated remnant colonies along old railroad-right-of-ways. Since this species naturally occurs in low densities these isolated populations may not be able to maintain themselves.
