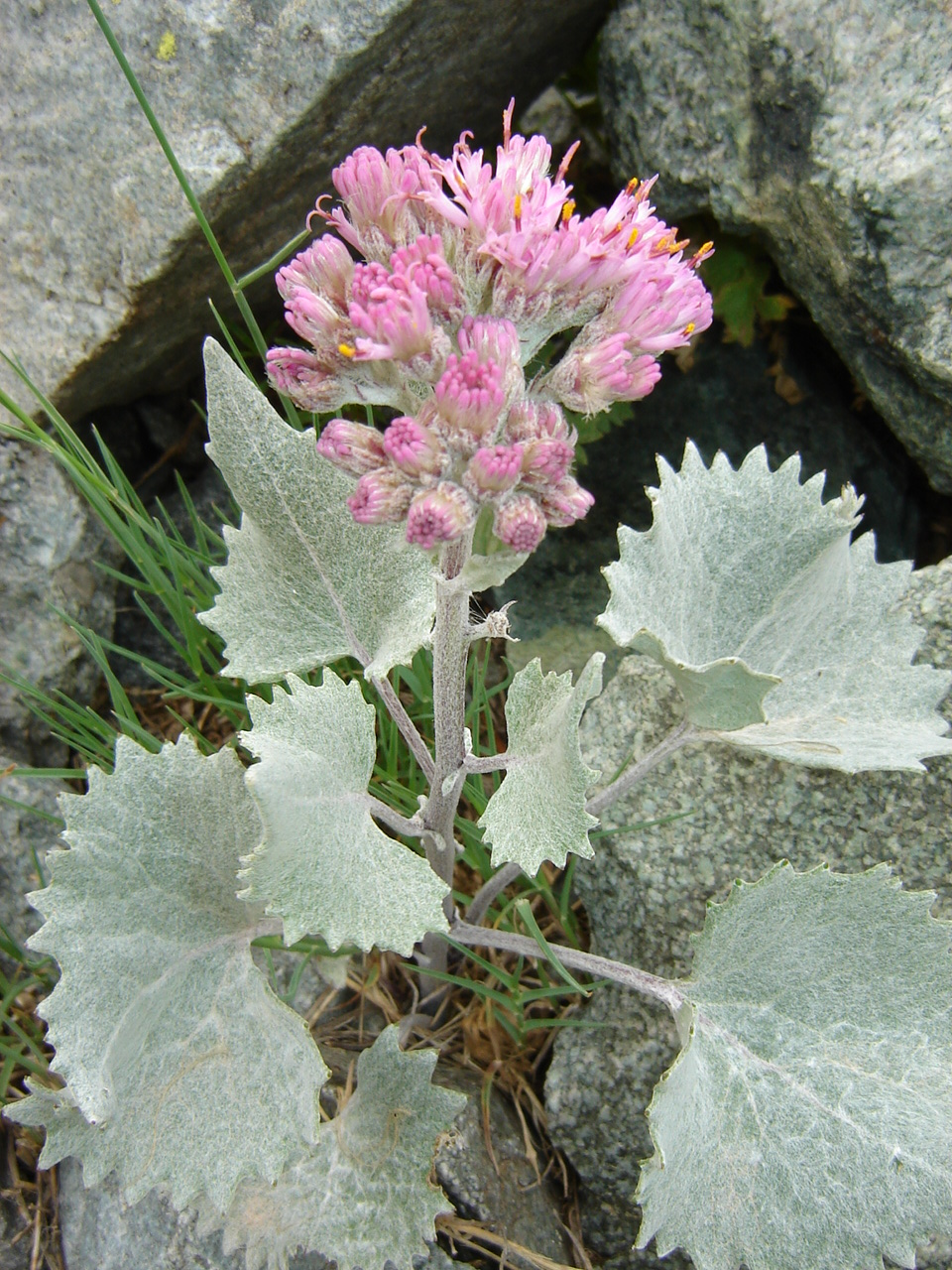
- Adenostyles leucophylla

Scientific classification
- Kingdom: Plantae
- Clade: Tracheophytes
- Clade: Angiosperms
- Clade: Eudicots
- Clade: Asterids
- Order: Asterales
- Family: Asteraceae
- Subfamily: Asteroideae
- Tribe: Senecioneae
- Genus: Adenostyles; Cass. 1816 not Benth. & Hook.f. 1883 (Orchidaceae)

= Adenostyles =

Genus of flowering plants

Adenostyles is a genus of flowering plants in the sunflower family Asteraceae, and of the tribe Senecioneae. It was described as a genus in 1816. Adenostyles occur in the temperate climates of the northern hemisphere, mainly in Europe and Asia Minor.

Adenostyles includes species that were considered to belong to the genus Cacalia. The term was used in 1883 for a genus of Orchidaceae.

== Species ==
As of July 2020, Plants of the World online has 6 accepted species:

- Adenostyles alliariae (Gouan) Kern. - Southern, Central and Eastern Europe
- Adenostyles alpina (L.) Bluff & Fingerh. - Central Europe
- Adenostyles australis (Ten.) Iamonico & Pignatti
- Adenostyles briquetii Gamisans - Corsica
- Adenostyles dubia Rchb.f.
- Adenostyles intermedia Hegetschw.
- Adenostyles leucophylla Rchb - Alps

Selected hybrids include:

- Adenostyles × canescens Sennholz
- Adenostyles × eginensis Lagger ex Braun

Selected synonyms include:

- Adenostyles macrophylla (M.Bieb.) Czerep. — synonym of Caucasalia macrophylla (M.Bieb.) B.Nord.
- Adenostyles platyphylloides (Sommier & Levier) Czerep. — synonym of Caucasalia pontica (K.Koch) Greuter
- Adenostyles rhombifolia (Willd.) Pimenov — synonym of Caucasalia macrophylla (M.Bieb.) B.Nord.
- Adenostyles similiflorus (Kolak.) Konechn. — synonym of Caucasalia similiflora (Kolak.) B.Nord.
