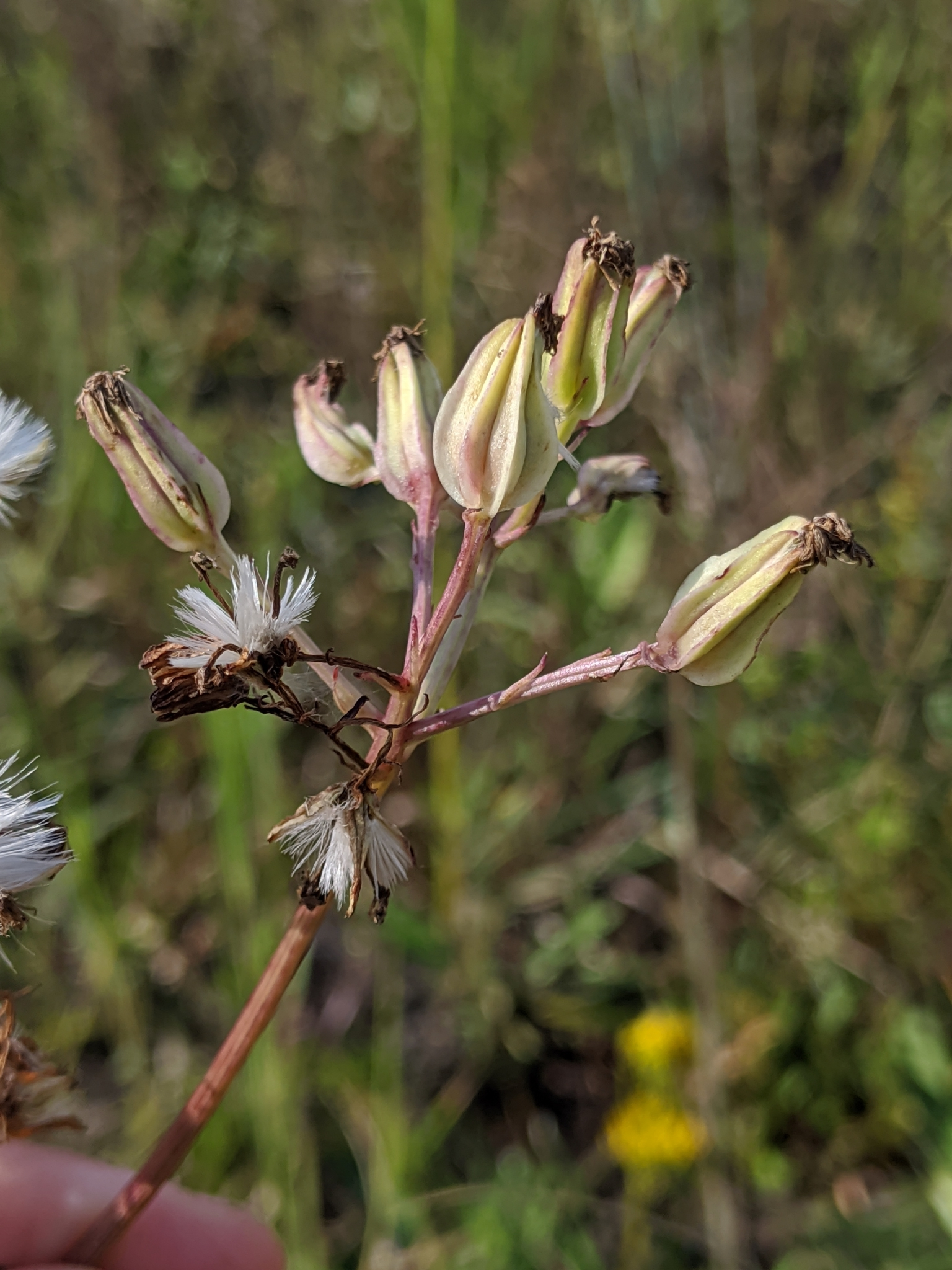

Conservation status
- Critically Imperiled (NatureServe)

Scientific classification
- Kingdom: Plantae
- Clade: Tracheophytes
- Clade: Angiosperms
- Clade: Eudicots
- Clade: Asterids
- Order: Asterales
- Family: Asteraceae
- Genus: Arnoglossum
- Species: A. album

Binomial name
- Arnoglossum album L.C.Anderson

= Arnoglossum album =

Species of flowering plant

Arnoglossum album, the Bay County Indian plantain, is a rare Florida species of plants in the family Asteraceae, first described to modern science in 1998. It has been found only in Bay and Gulf Counties in the Florida Panhandle.

Arnoglossum album is a plant growing up to 100 cm (40 inches) tall. Flower heads are white, occasionally with a pink tinge. The species grows in poorly drained acidic soils.
