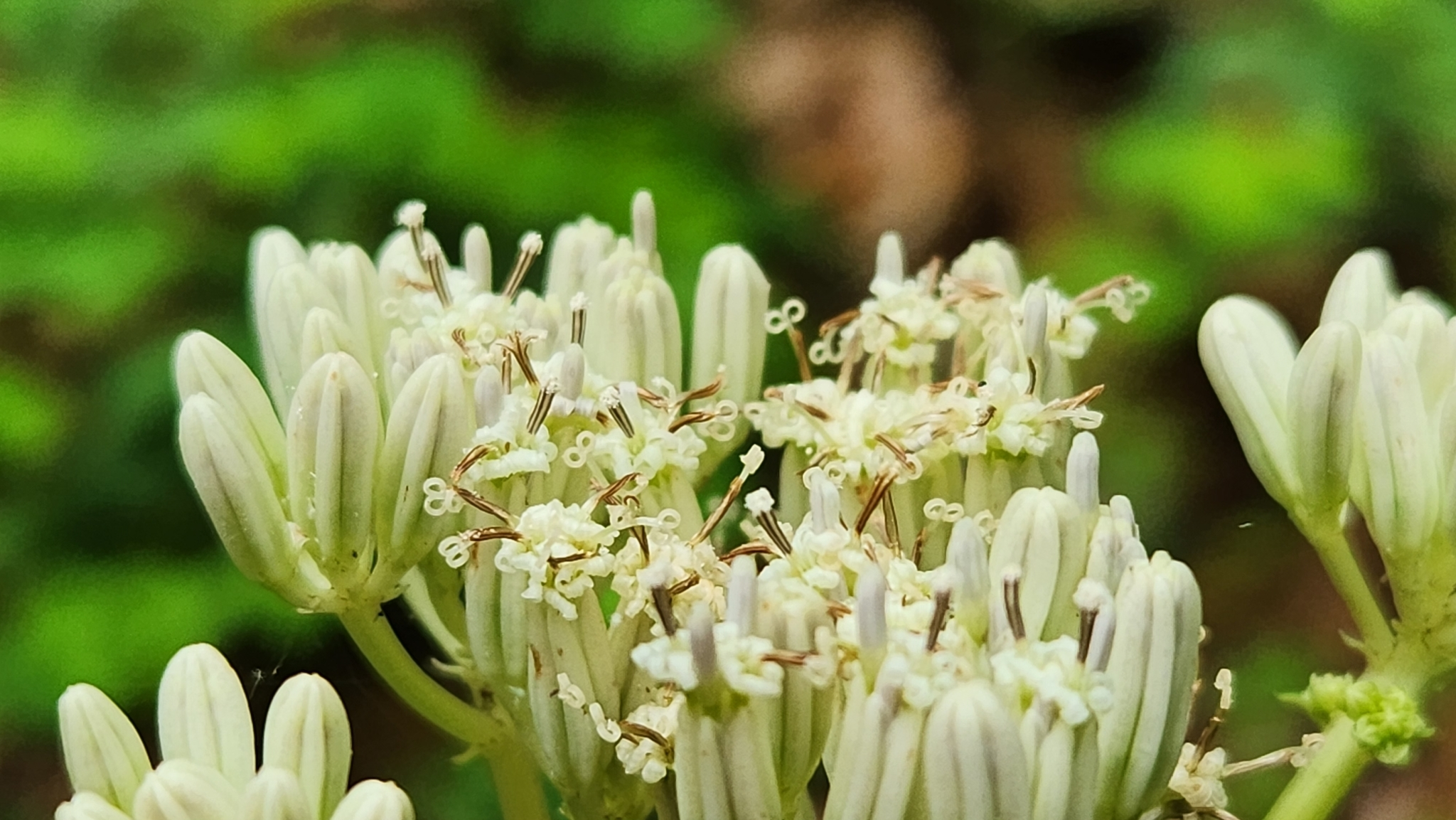

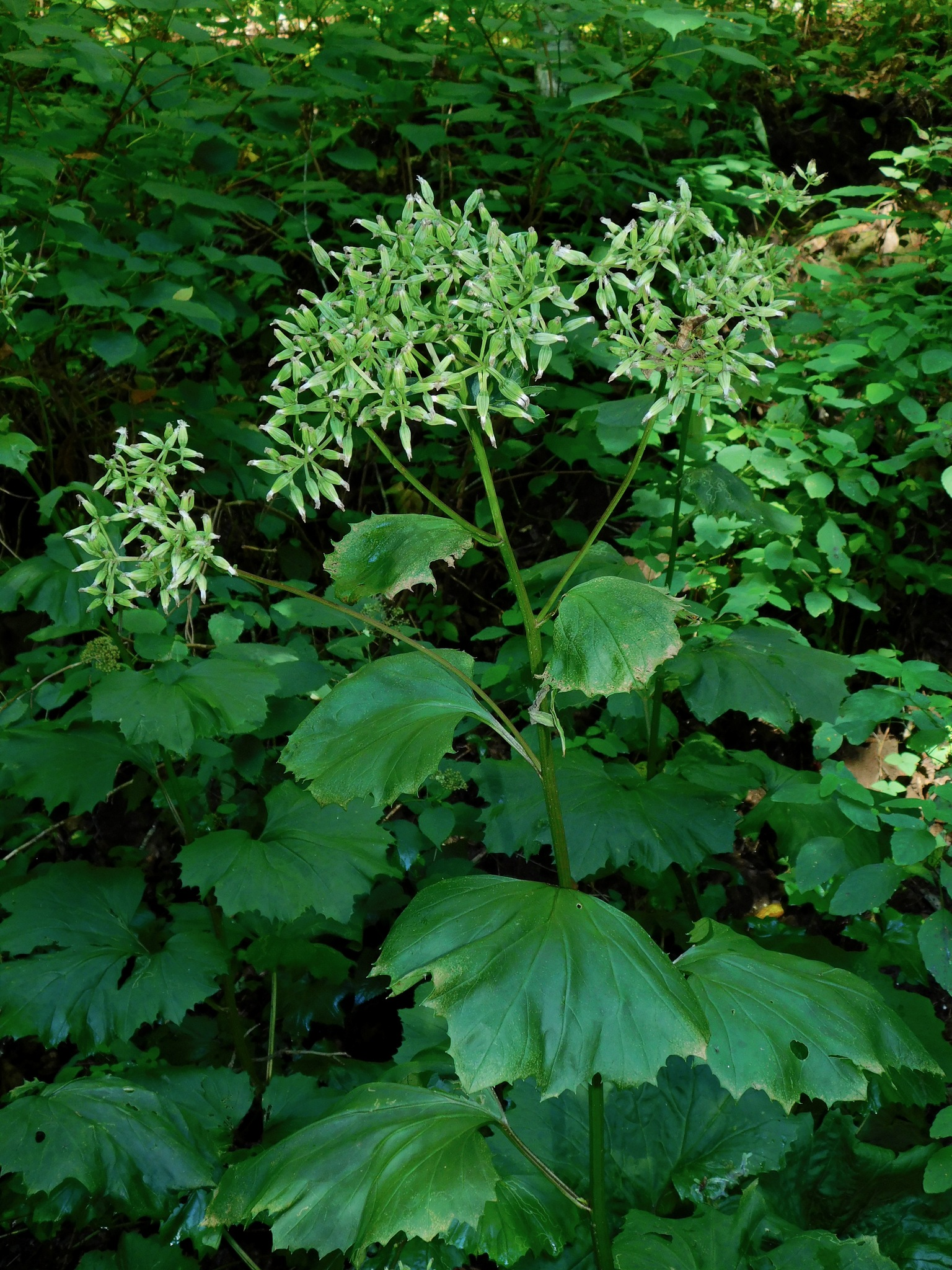

Scientific classification
- Kingdom: Plantae
- Clade: Tracheophytes
- Clade: Angiosperms
- Clade: Eudicots
- Clade: Asterids
- Order: Asterales
- Family: Asteraceae
- Genus: Arnoglossum
- Species: A. reniforme

Binomial name
- Arnoglossum reniforme (William Jackson Hooker) H.Rob.

Synonyms
- Synonymy: Senecio atriplicifolius var. reniformis Hook. 1834; Arnoglossum muehlenbergii (Sch.Bip.) H.Rob.; Cacalia muehlenbergii (Sch.Bip.) Fernald; Cacalia reniformis Muhl. ex Willd. 1803 not Lam. 1779; Conophora reniformis (Hook.) Nieuwl.; Mesadenia muehlenbergii (Sch.Bip.) Rydb.; Mesadenia reniformis (Hook.) Raf.; Senecio muehlenbergii Sch.Bip.; Senecio reniformis (Hook.) MacMill.

= Arnoglossum reniforme =

Species of flowering plant

Arnoglossum reniforme, the great Indian plantain, is a North American species of plants in the sunflower family. It is native to the central and east-central United States primarily in the Appalachian Mountains, the Ohio/Tennessee Valley, and the Mississippi Valley. There are additional populations in the east (New Jersey, Maryland, Pennsylvania, South Carolina) and further west in Oklahoma.

Arnoglossum reniforme is a large plant growing up to 300 cm (120 inches or 10 feet) tall. Flower heads are small but numerous, usually white or pale green. The species grows in open, wooded areas.

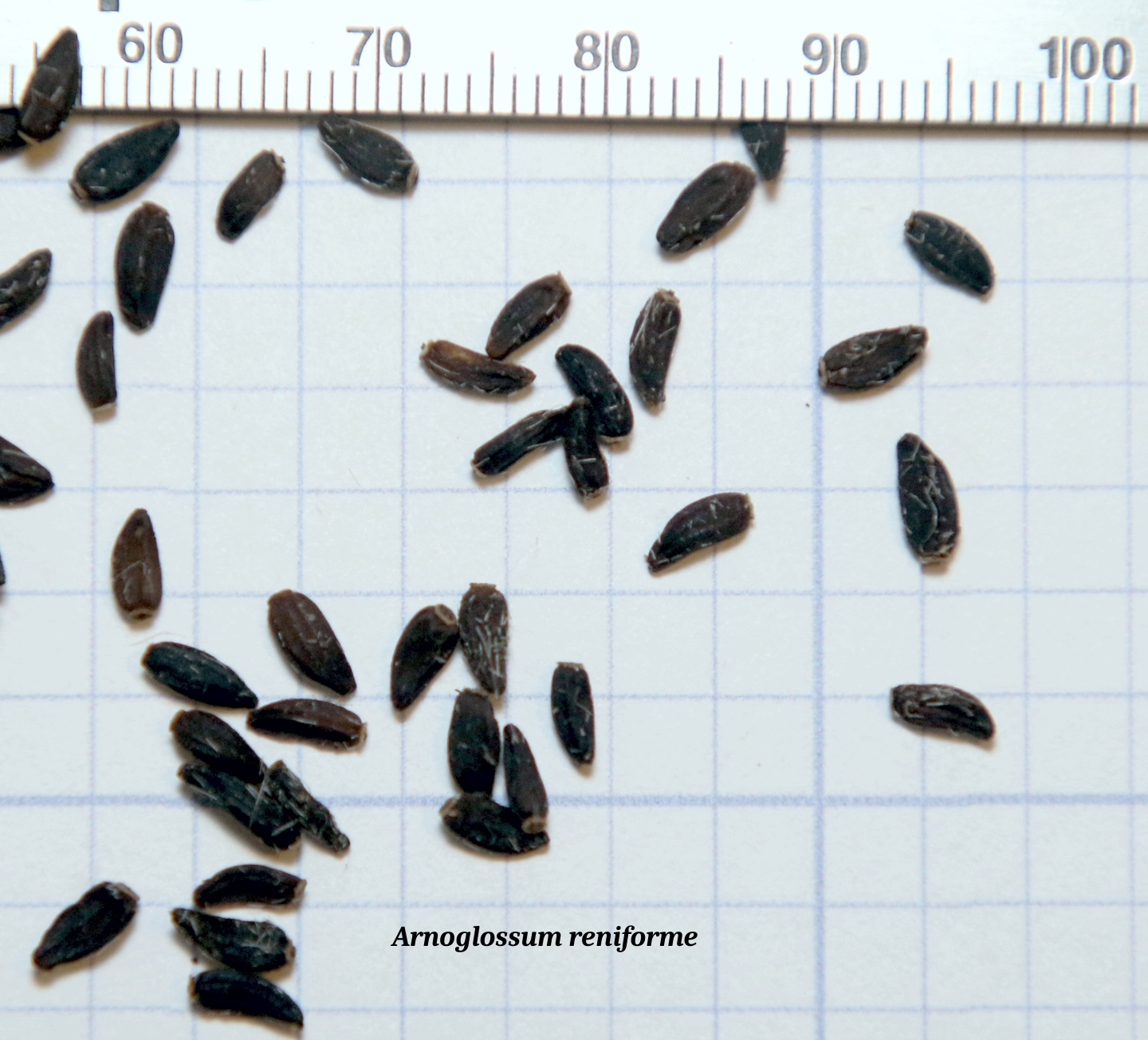
Arnoglossum reniforme seeds
