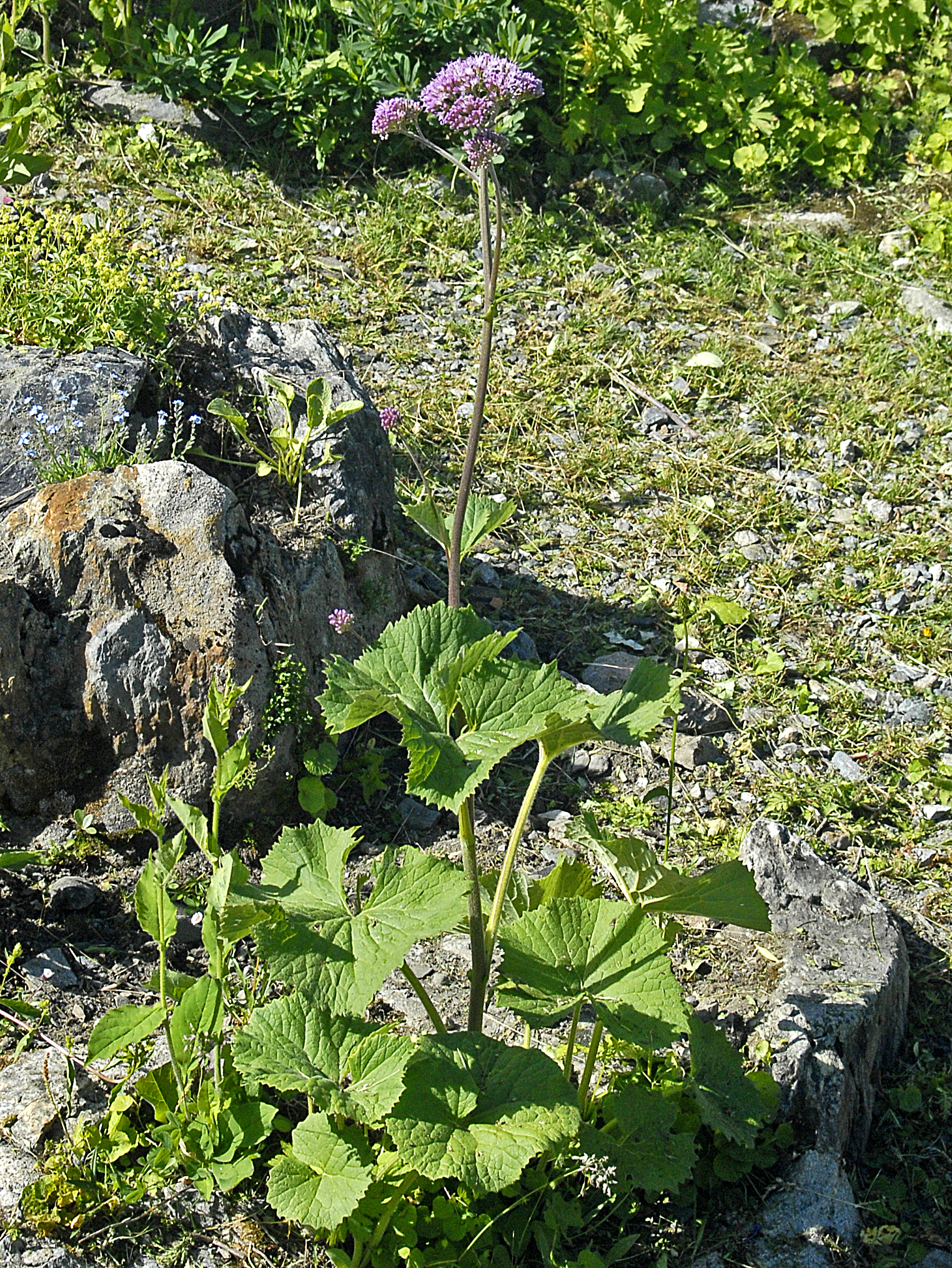
- Plant of Adenostyles alliariae at the Giardino Botanico Alpino Chanousia

Scientific classification
- Kingdom: Plantae
- Clade: Tracheophytes
- Clade: Angiosperms
- Clade: Eudicots
- Clade: Asterids
- Order: Asterales
- Family: Asteraceae
- Genus: Adenostyles
- Species: A. alliariae

Binomial name
- Adenostyles alliariae (Gouan) A.Kern.

= Adenostyles alliariae =

Species of flowering plant in the daisy family

Adenostyles alliariae is herbaceous perennial flowering plant in the daisy family Asteraceae. It is native to southern and Central Europe, Ukraine, and Turkey.

== Subspecies ==
- Adenostyles alliariae subsp. alliariae
- Adenostyles alliariae subsp. pyrenaica (Lange) P. Fournier

== Synonyms ==
- Adenostyles albifrons (L. f.) Rchb.
- Adenostyles albida Cass.
- Adenostyles albida Cass. subsp. kerneri (Simonk.) Nyman (synonym of subsp. alliariae)
- Adenostyles albida Cass. subsp. pyrenaica (Lange) Rouy (synonym of subsp. hybrida)
- Adenostyles alliariae (Gouan) A.Kern. subsp. pyrenaica (Lange) P.Fourn. (synonym of subsp. hybrida)
- Adenostyles alpina (L.) Bluff. & Fingerh
- Adenostyles alpina (L.) Bluff. & Fingerh subsp. alliariae A. Kern.
- Adenostyles alpina (L.) Bluff & Fingerh. subsp. alpina var. australis (Ten.) Fiori (synonym of subsp. alliariae)
- Adenostyles alpina (L.) Bluff & Fingerh. subsp. alpina var. alliariae (Gouan) Fiori (synonym of subsp. alliariae)
- Adenostyles alpina (L.) Bluff & Fingerh. subsp. alpina var. macrocephala (Huter, Porta & Rigo) Fiori (synonym of subsp. hybrida)
- Adenostyles australis Ten. (synonym of subsp. alliariae)
- Adenostyles hirsuta (Vill.) Fourr.
- Adenostyles hybrida DC. (synonym of subsp. hybrida)
- Adenostyles kerneri Simonk.
- Adenostyles macrocephala Huter & al.
- Adenostyles orientalis Boiss. (synonym of subsp. hybrida)
- Adenostyles petasites (Lam.) Bluff & Fingerh.
- Adenostyles petasites (Lam.) Bluff & Fingerh. subsp. hybrida (DC.) Arcang. (synonym of subsp. hybrida)
- Adenostyles pyrenaica Lange (synonym of subsp. hybrida)
- Adenostyles viridis Cass. subsp. australis (Ten.) Nyman (synonym of subsp. alliariae)
- Cacalia albifrons L.f.
- Cacalia albida Cass. ex Schur
- Cacalia alliariae Gouan (1773)
- Cacalia hirsuta Vill.
- Cacalia petasites Lam.
- Cacalia tomentosa Jacq.
- Eupatorium albifrons (L.f.) E.H.L.Krause

== Description ==
Adenostyles alliariae can reach a height of 40–70 centimetres (16–28 in). The inflorescence consists of dense corymbs hold by hairy peduncles. The small heads are usually composed of 3 to 4 flowers. The receptacle (the part that collects and maintains individual flowers) is naked or hairless. The flowers are of a tubular type and hermaphroditic. The corolla is cylindrical and pink violet. The length of the flower is of 7–8 mm. The period of flowering is from June until August.

Basal leaves are large, kidney-shaped or heart-shaped, leaf margin is toothed. Size of leaves at the base: width 12–14 centimetres (4.7–5.5 in), length 6–9 centimetres (2.4–3.5 in). Cauline leaves are arranged in alternating fashion with successively smaller size and are petiolated. At the base of the petiole are present two large leaflets enveloping the stem.

== Distribution and habitat ==
The area of origin of the species is considered to be mountainous southern Europe. The preferred habitat of this species are wooded areas with tall grasses, rocks, and moraines at 1,300–2,400 metres (4,300–7,900 ft) elevation.

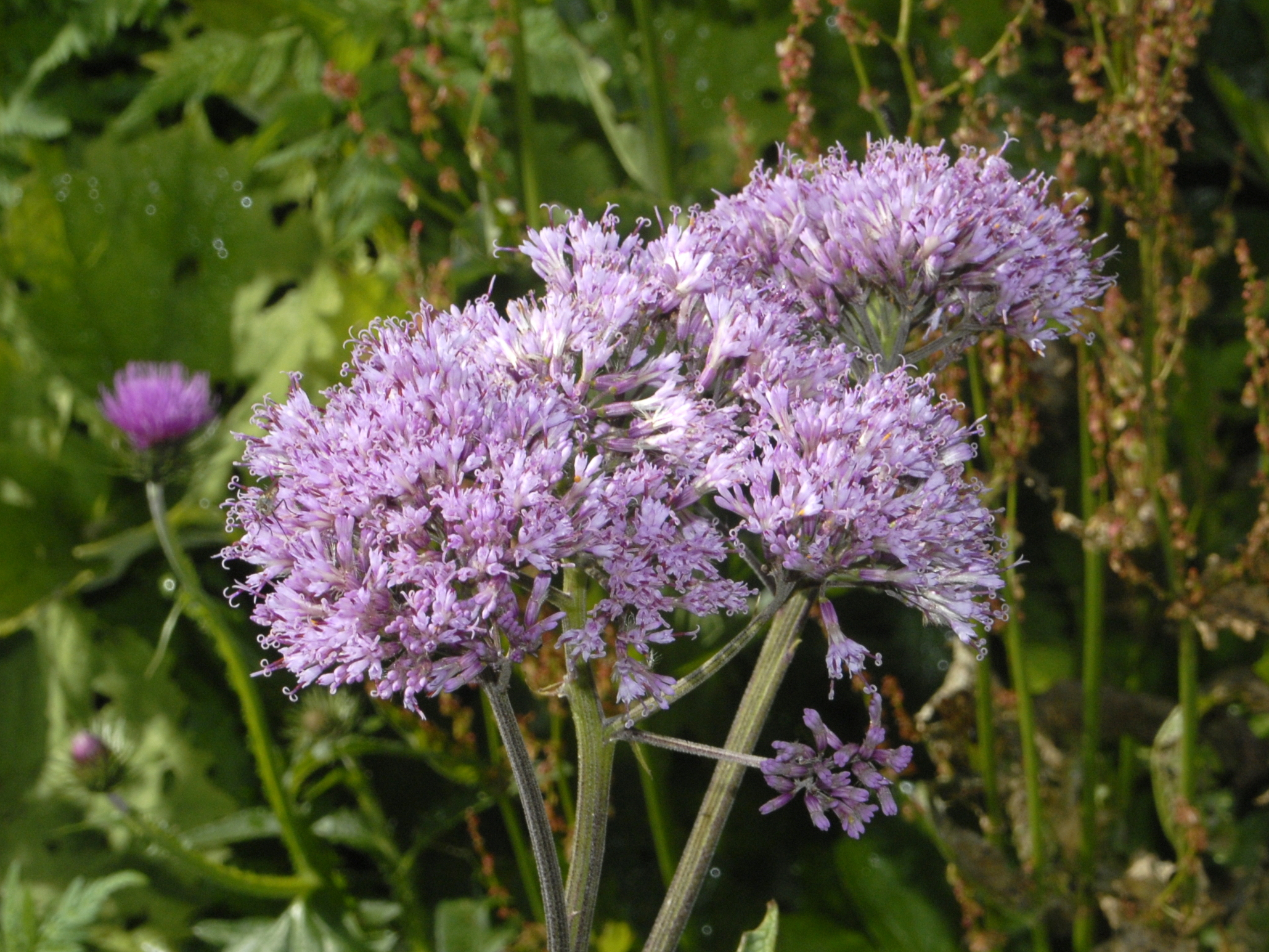
Inflorescence of Adenostyles alliariae

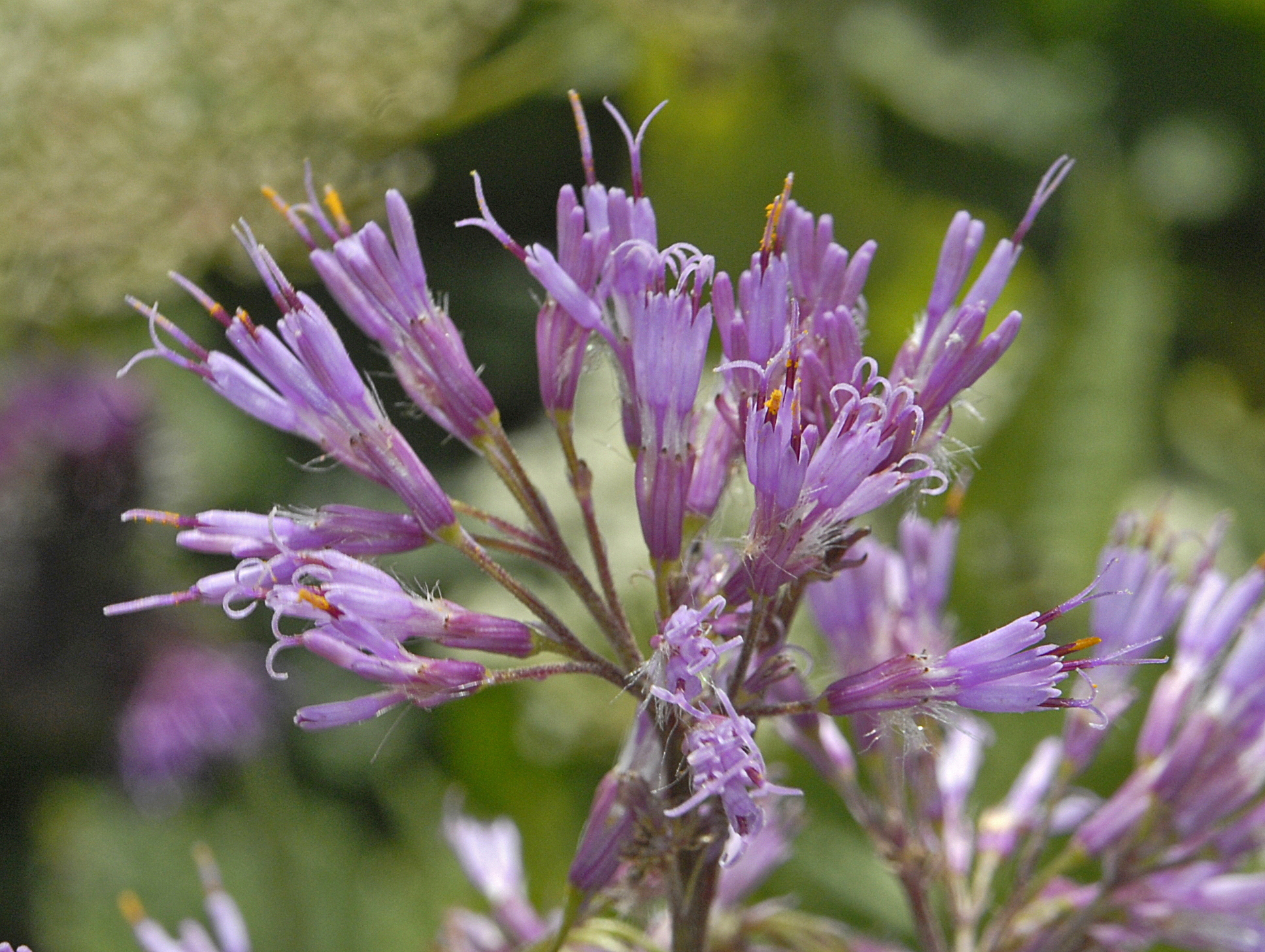
Close-up on flowers

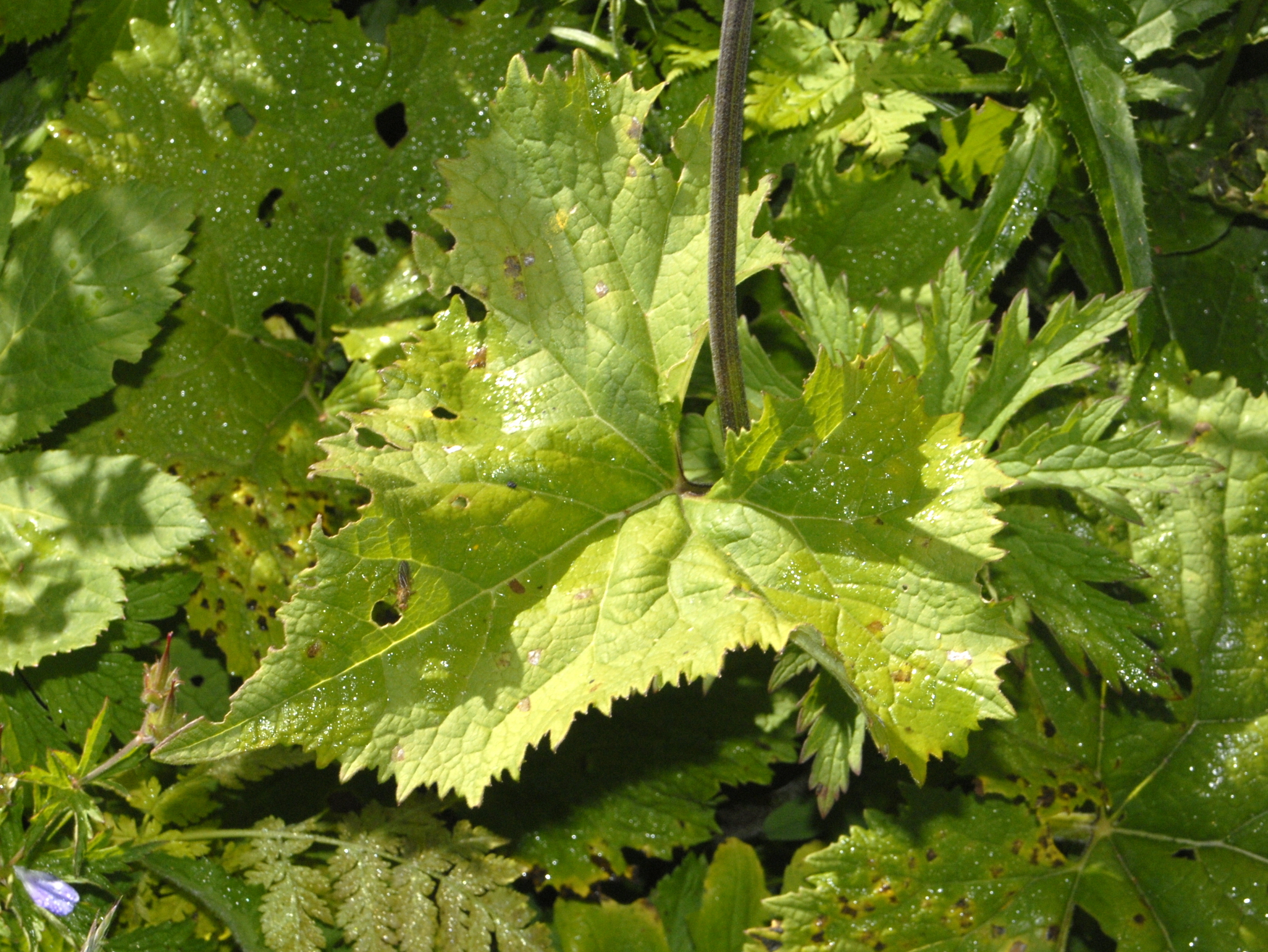
Leaf
