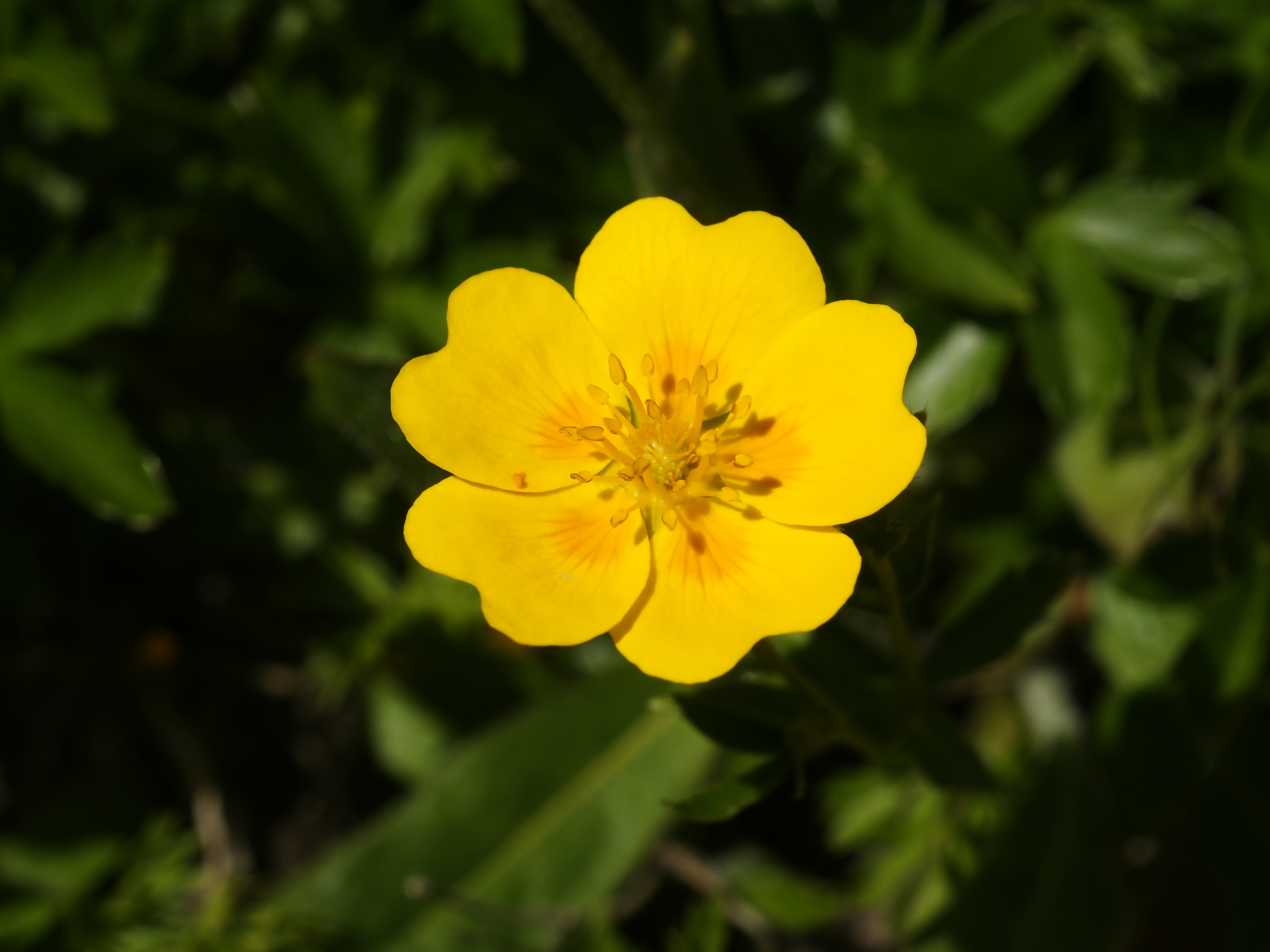
- Close-up of flower
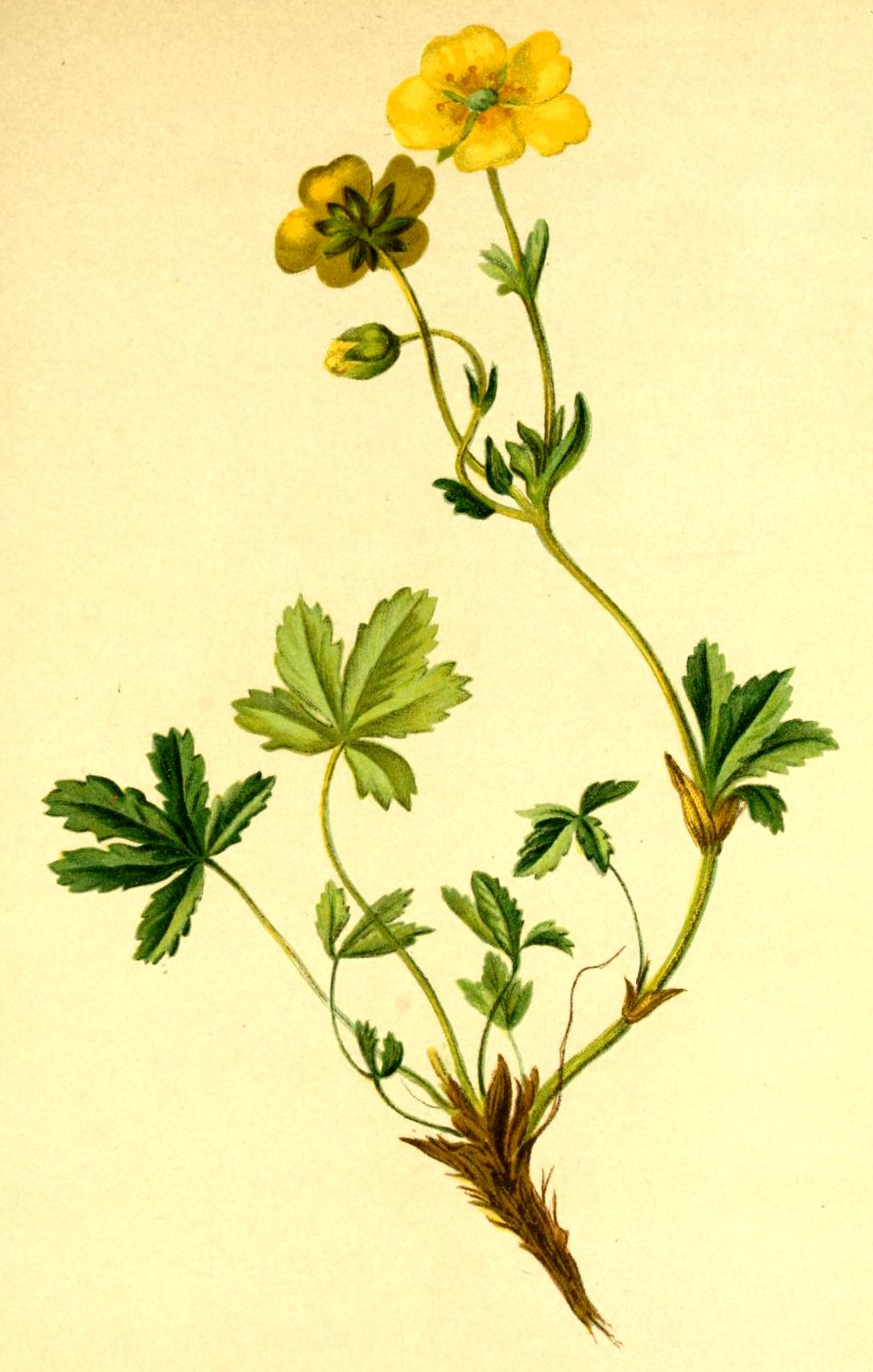
- Botanical illustration

Scientific classification
- Kingdom: Plantae
- Clade: Tracheophytes
- Clade: Angiosperms
- Clade: Eudicots
- Clade: Rosids
- Order: Rosales
- Family: Rosaceae
- Genus: Potentilla
- Species: P. aurea

Binomial name
- Potentilla aurea L.

Synonyms
- List: Dynamidium aureum (L.) Fourr.; Dynamidium erodorum (Jord.) Fourr.; Fragaria aurea (L.) Crantz; Potentilla ambigua Gaudin; Potentilla chrysocraspeda Lehm.; Potentilla erodora Jord. ex Verl.; Potentilla heerii Brügger; Potentilla pseudofrigida Schur; Potentilla ternata K.Koch; Potentilla transsilvanica Schur

= Potentilla aurea =

Species of plant in the rose family

Potentilla aurea, the golden cinquefoil, is a species of flowering plant in the family Rosaceae. It is native to the mountains of mainland Europe, and has been introduced to Turkey. A number of cultivars are available, including 'Aurantiaca', 'Goldklumpen', and 'Plena'.
