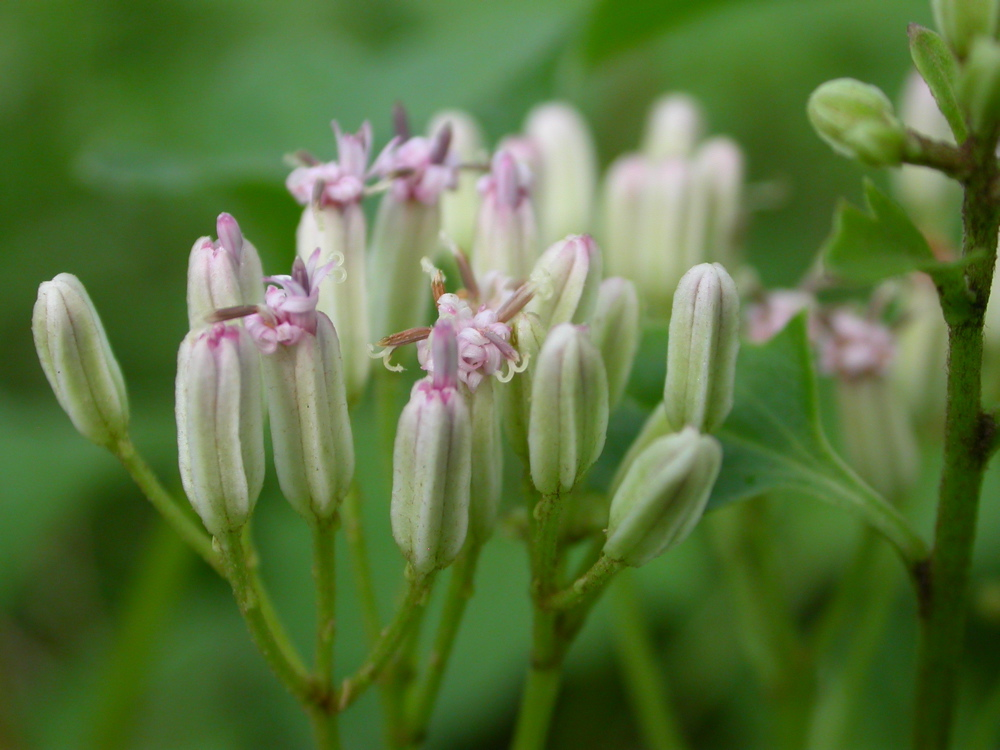

Scientific classification
- Kingdom: Plantae
- Clade: Tracheophytes
- Clade: Angiosperms
- Clade: Eudicots
- Clade: Asterids
- Order: Asterales
- Family: Asteraceae
- Genus: Arnoglossum
- Species: A. diversifolium

Binomial name
- Arnoglossum diversifolium (Torr. & A.Gray) H.Rob.

Synonyms
- Cacalia diversifolia Torr. & A.Gray; Conophora diversifolia (Torr. & A.Gray) Nieuwl.; Mesadenia difformis Small; Mesadenia diversifolia (Torr. & A.Gray) Greene; Senecio floridanus Sch.Bip.

= Arnoglossum diversifolium =

Species of flowering plant

Arnoglossum diversifolium before growing flower heads.

Arnoglossum diversifolium is a North American species of Arnoglossum and the sunflower family. It is native to the southeastern United States, the states of Florida, Georgia, and Alabama.

Arnoglossum diversifolium is a large plant sometimes as much as 300 cm (120 inches or 10 feet) tall. It has white or purple flower heads. The species generally grows in wet soil in swamps or along streambanks.

== Taxonomy ==
Arnoglossum diversifolium was originally described by John Torrey and Asa Gray in the second volume of their publication A Flora of North America, which was published in 1843. The basionym (original name) was Cacalia diversifolia, and the holotype (original type specimen) was collected by Alvan Wentworth Chapman, without a recorded date or exact county, and sent to Torrey and Gray for identification. In 1974, Harold E. Robinson moved the species to its current genus in the Phytologia journal.

The genus name “Arnoglossum” comes from the Greek word arnos, meaning lamb, and glossum, meaning tongue. This was an early name for the European Plantago species, which resembles the leaf shape of the Arnoglossum. The species name “diversifolium” comes directly from Latin epithet and means “diverse leaves.” This refers to how the leaves at the specie's base differ in size and shape from the leaves high on the stem.

== Description ==
Arnoglossum diversifolium is characterized by overall containing a striated angled leaf structure, with a green saturation on both sides of the leaf. Fine parallel lines with slight ridges and shallow groves line the front of the leaf. Furthermore, A. diversifolium contains basil leaves (attached to the base) and cauline leaves (attached to the stem). Basil leaves are identified by stalks with 10cm brown hairs and a main leaf structure appearing as a heart shaped oval. Cauline leaves are differentiated by deltoid leaves, sear shaped with a rounded base. The stems of A. diversifolium are ribbed, proximal ribbed appearing purple and distally displaying angular and green. A. diversifolium typically displays 100-200cm bottom to top.

== Distribution and habitat ==
Arnoglossum diversifolium is distributed throughout several areas of the southeastern United States. It is primarily found in southeastern Alabama, southwestern Georgia, and the panhandle of Florida, with smaller populations extending into parts of central Florida. Its natural habitat consists mainly of swamps and wetlands, where the soil is moist to wet. The plant can also be found growing in areas where soil sits on top of limestone. Additionally, Arnoglossum diversifolium can grow in areas with partial to full sun, such as wooded swamps and open wetland areas. The climate of the southeastern United States provides favorable growing conditions for this species.

== Ecology ==
Arnoglossum diversifolium is found in floodplain forests, floodplain swamps, bottomland forests, hydric hammocks, and along streams and rivers. It is a perennial plant that reproduces using two methods: by producing seeds or using basal offshoots. These shoots make clumps of leaves that are able to make it through the winter and then separate from the original plant. This permits them to grow independently, but these new plants are not guaranteed to make new plants the following year. This plant is easiest to spot during the flowering season, which runs from mid-May through July, and when it creates fruit between June and September. The plant has a big, loosely put together clump of flowers at the top of its stem. This cluster contains a ton of cylindrical flower heads, and each is about 0.5 inches (1.25 cm) tall and grows at the ends of smaller branches.

Although pollination and seed dispersal processes of Arnoglossum diversifolium does not have a lot of published information, scientists think that bees and other insects help pollinate its flowers. The plant's seeds are believed to spread through natural factors and each fruit contains the pappus, the thin hair-like structures that make it simpler for seeds to be carried. After a seed germinates, the plant probably takes around two years to start creating flowers.

== Conservation status and current efforts ==
The species Arnoglossum diversifolium currently occupies only the southeastern United States, found in just three of the fifty states: Alabama, Florida, and Georgia. As the species status varies by state, it is most threatened in Alabama. Table 1 depicts the status per state, with S indicating state and the number indicating its ranking. On a global scale, Arnoglossum diversifolium is classified as G3, meaning it is internationally ranked as a vulnerable species. The classifications come from a free access website known as NatureServe, which is nationally recognized by the United States for its accurate data.

Table 1
State	Conservation Status
Alabama	S1: Critically Imperiled
Florida	S3: Vulnerable
Georgia	S2: Imperiled

Despite A. diversifolium being at risk in Alabama, Florida, and Georgia, there are no known current conservation efforts being enacted in Alabama and Florida. Georgia is the only state to publish a statewide plan to mitigate threats. According to Georgia’s Department of Natural Resources, the state has taken action by implementing the SWAP plan. The SWAP plan measures the matrix of general threats to A. diversifolium, then follows a four step protocol within the program to try and conserve the species within the state. Firstly, SWAP conducts a survey that measures the distribution of the species. The second action focuses on maintaining and protecting the key populations assessed in the survey. Action 3 aims to improve the key populations habitats by using controlled, “prescribed” fires. Lastly, Action 4 records the conservation status after all the efforts have been completed, mainly to see what needs to be improved in conserving A. diversifolium. The state of Georgia also has published recommendations for residents to follow in conserving the species, which mainly emphasizes avoiding destructive habits near wetlands.

== Threats ==
Threats contributing to the endangerment of Arnoglossum diversifolium include ditching, draining, and filling in wetlands. Deforestation of bottomlands and floodplains also destroy the habitat of the plant and lead to the endangerment. Artificially controlling streams to form ponds and lakes. Invasion by exotic pest plants such as Chinese Privet and Japanese Climbing Fern as these plants compete with Arnoglossum diversifolium for space, sunlight, and soil nutrients. The fishing culture of the south has also contributed to the threats of Arnoglossum diversifolium. Damming of streams for fishing and trampling, or walking through wetlands, are also a threat at sites where fishing occurs. The greatest threat to this species though, is alteration of the natural movement, volume, timing, or distribution of water in the alluvial forests where it occurs.
