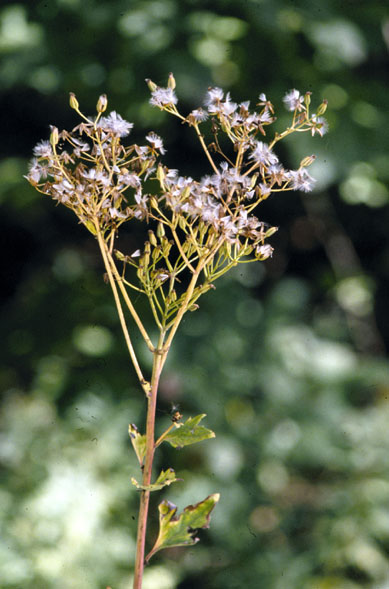

Scientific classification
- Kingdom: Plantae
- Clade: Tracheophytes
- Clade: Angiosperms
- Clade: Eudicots
- Clade: Asterids
- Order: Asterales
- Family: Asteraceae
- Genus: Arnoglossum
- Species: A. atriplicifolium

Binomial name
- Arnoglossum atriplicifolium (L.) H.Rob.

Synonyms
- Synonymy: Adenimesa atriplicifolia Nieuwl.; Cacalia atriplicifolia L.; Cacalia gigantea Nees; Cacalia paniculata Raf.; Cacalia rotundifolia (Raf.) House; Cacalia similis (Small) J.Buchholz & E.J.Palmer; Conophora atriplicifolia (L.) Nieuwl.; Conophora similis (Small) Nieuwl.; Mesadenia atriplicifolia (L.) Raf.; Mesadenia pulverulenta Raf.; Mesadenia rotundifolia Raf.; Mesadenia similis Small; Senecio atriplicifolius (L.) Hook.

= Arnoglossum atriplicifolium =

Species of flowering plant

Arnoglossum atriplicifolium, the pale Indian plantain, is a perennial herbaceous wildflower in the sunflower family (Asteraceae). native to the central and eastern United States. It can reach heights of up to 3 metres (10 ft), with dramatic clusters of white flowers at the top of a central, unbranching stalk.

== Description ==
Arnoglossum atriplicifolium is a large perennial plant with an unbranched stalk up to 2 metres (5 ft) tall, sometimes much taller, rising from a basal rosette up to 0.3 metres (1 ft) wide. The stalk is pale green to pale purple and has alternate leaves measuring up to 20 centimetres (8 in) long and 20 centimetres (8 in) across, becoming smaller as they ascend the stalk. The stems and lower surface of the leaves have a grayish white color, which is the source of the "pale" in the common name and is a distinguishing feature when differentiating it from other species in the Arnoglossum genus.

At the top of the central stalk is a flat-topped corymb, or cluster, of 4 to 15 flower heads. Flower heads are white, sometimes with a bit of green or purple, with disc florets but no ray florets. The plant spreads by means of underground rhizomes.

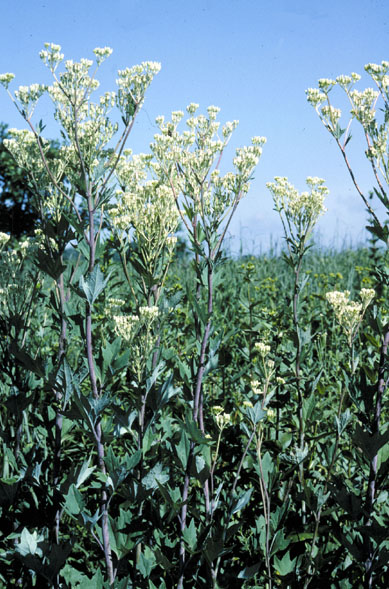
Arnoglossum atriplicifolium

== Distribution and habitat ==
It is widely distributed through the central and eastern states of the United States, from the Atlantic Coast westward to as far as Kansas, but it is listed as endangered in the state of New Jersey. It grows in pastures, roadsides, and edges of woods.

== Ecology ==
Flowers bloom from July to November. The plant is pollinated by insects, primarily wasps, including sand wasps (Bicyrtes), great black wasps (Sphex pensylvanicus), great golden digger wasps (Sphex ichneumoneus), and thread-waisted wasps, ( Ammophila spp.) flies, and small bees.

== Historical uses ==
Among the Cherokee Indians, leaves taken from the plant were traditionally used as a poultice for cuts and bruises. The bruised leaf, in this case, was bound over the spot and frequently removed.
