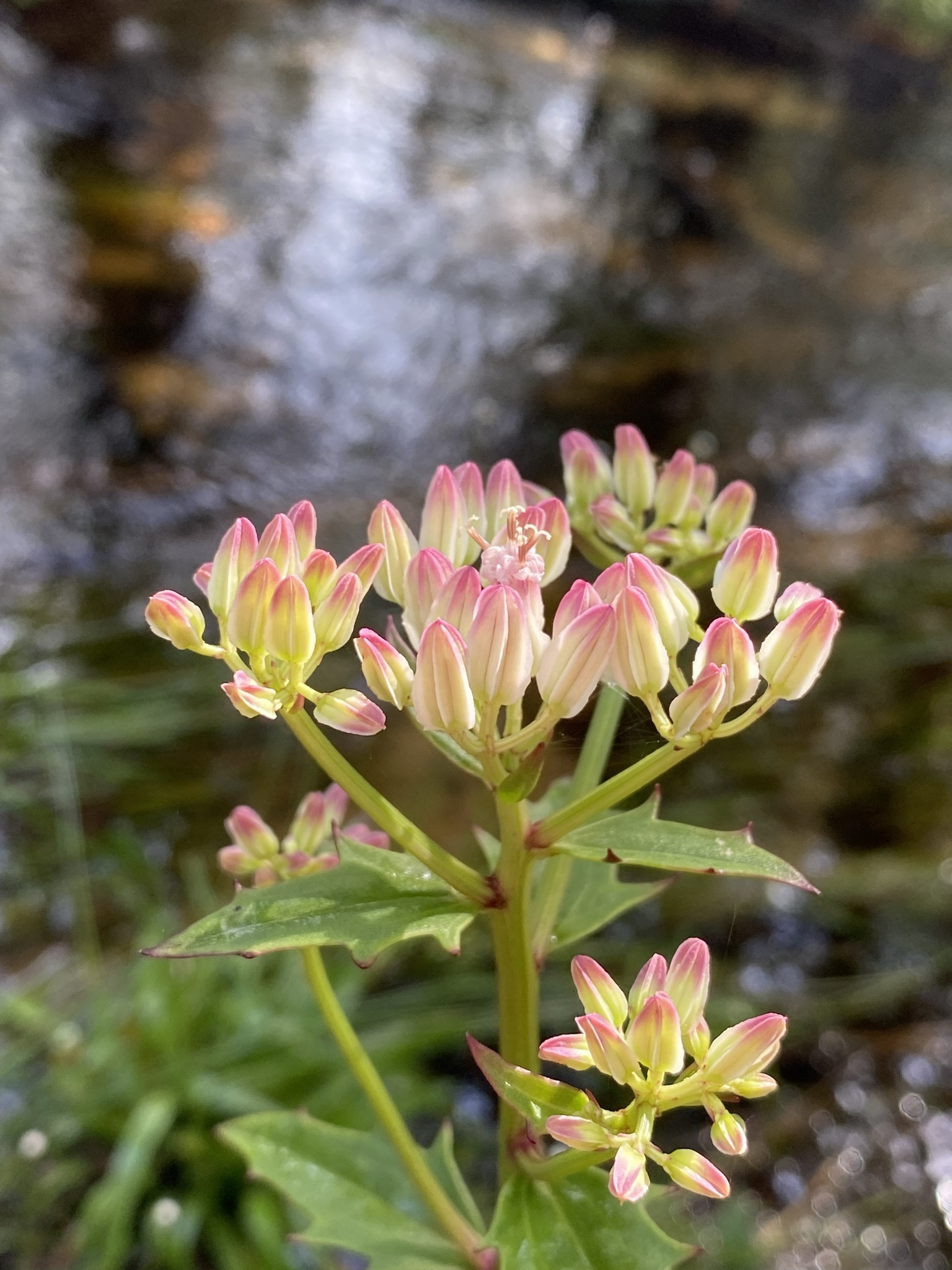

Scientific classification
- Kingdom: Plantae
- Clade: Tracheophytes
- Clade: Angiosperms
- Clade: Eudicots
- Clade: Asterids
- Order: Asterales
- Family: Asteraceae
- Genus: Arnoglossum
- Species: A. sulcatum

Binomial name
- Arnoglossum sulcatum (Fernald) H.Rob.

Synonyms
- Cacalia sulcata Fernald; Mesadenia sulcata (Fernald) Small; Mesadenia sulcata (Fernald) Harper

= Arnoglossum sulcatum =

Species of flowering plant

Arnoglossum sulcatum, the Georgia Indian plantain, is a North American species of plants in the sunflower family. It is native to the southeastern United States in the states of Mississippi, Alabama, Georgia, and Florida.

Arnoglossum sulcatum is a large plant growing up to 140 cm (56 inches) tall. Flower heads are small but numerous, usually white or pale green, occasionally slightly purplish. The species grows in wet, shaded areas.
