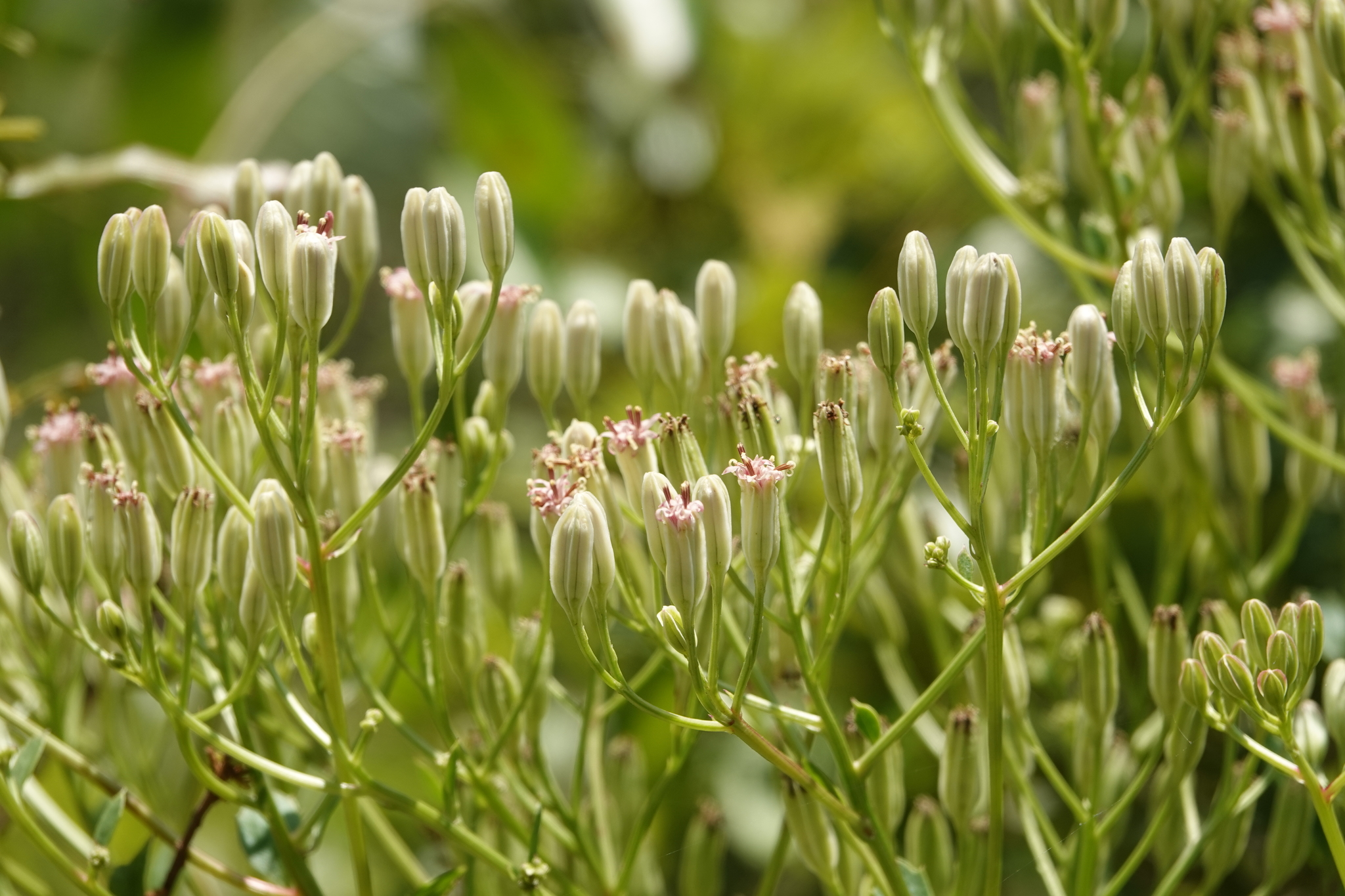

Conservation status
- Vulnerable (NatureServe)

Scientific classification
- Kingdom: Plantae
- Clade: Tracheophytes
- Clade: Angiosperms
- Clade: Eudicots
- Clade: Asterids
- Order: Asterales
- Family: Asteraceae
- Genus: Arnoglossum
- Species: A. floridanum

Binomial name
- Arnoglossum floridanum (A.Gray) H.Rob.

Synonyms
- Cacalia floridana A.Gray; Conophora floridana (A.Gray) Nieuwl.; Mesadenia floridana (A.Gray) Greene

= Arnoglossum floridanum =

Species of flowering plant

Arnoglossum floridanum, the Florida cacalia or Florida Indian plantain, is a Florida species of plants in the sunflower family.

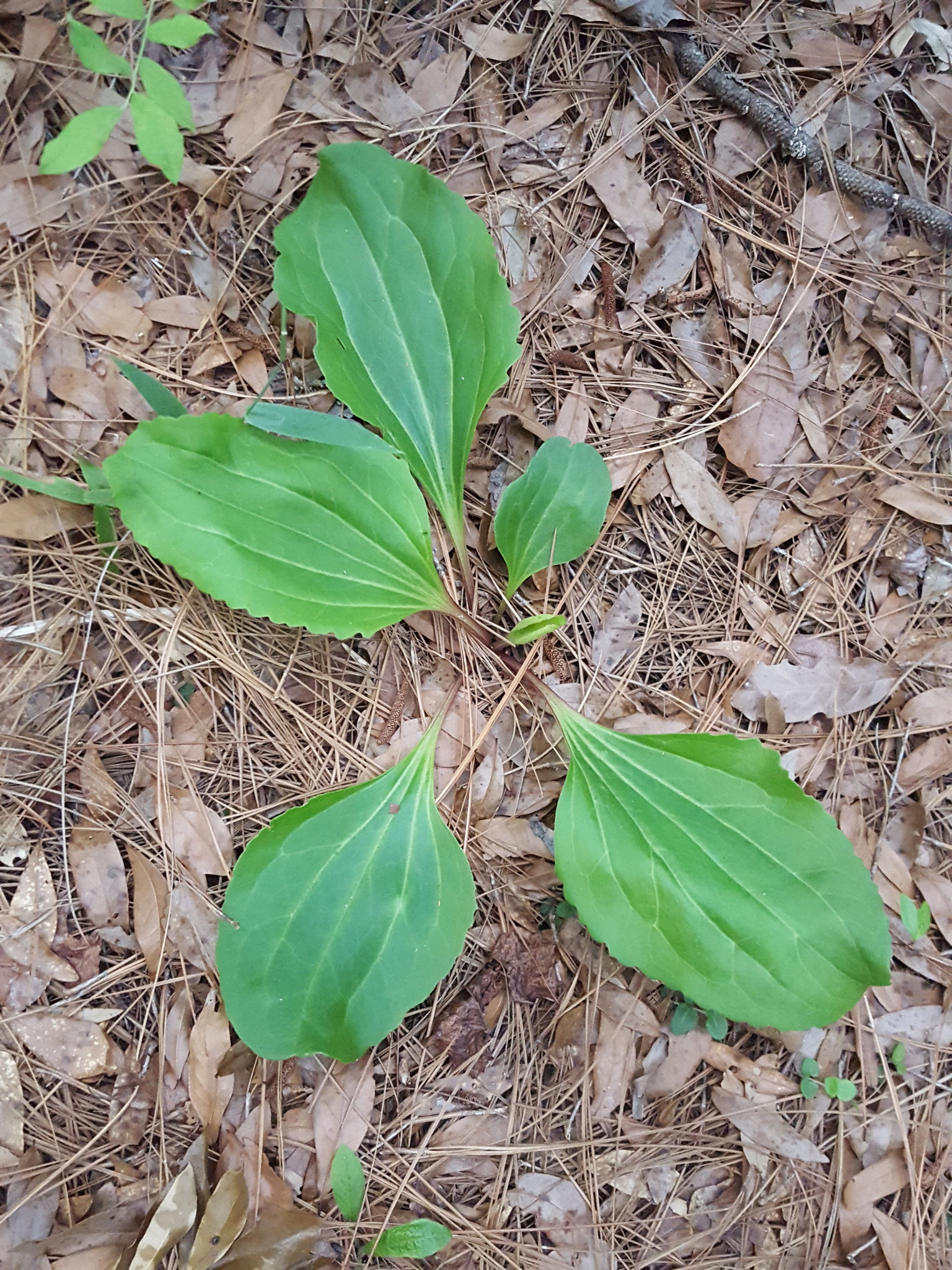

Arnoglossum floridanum is a plant growing up to 100 cm (40 inches) tall. Flower heads are white or pale green. The species grows in dry sandy ridges and pine-oak forests in central Florida.
