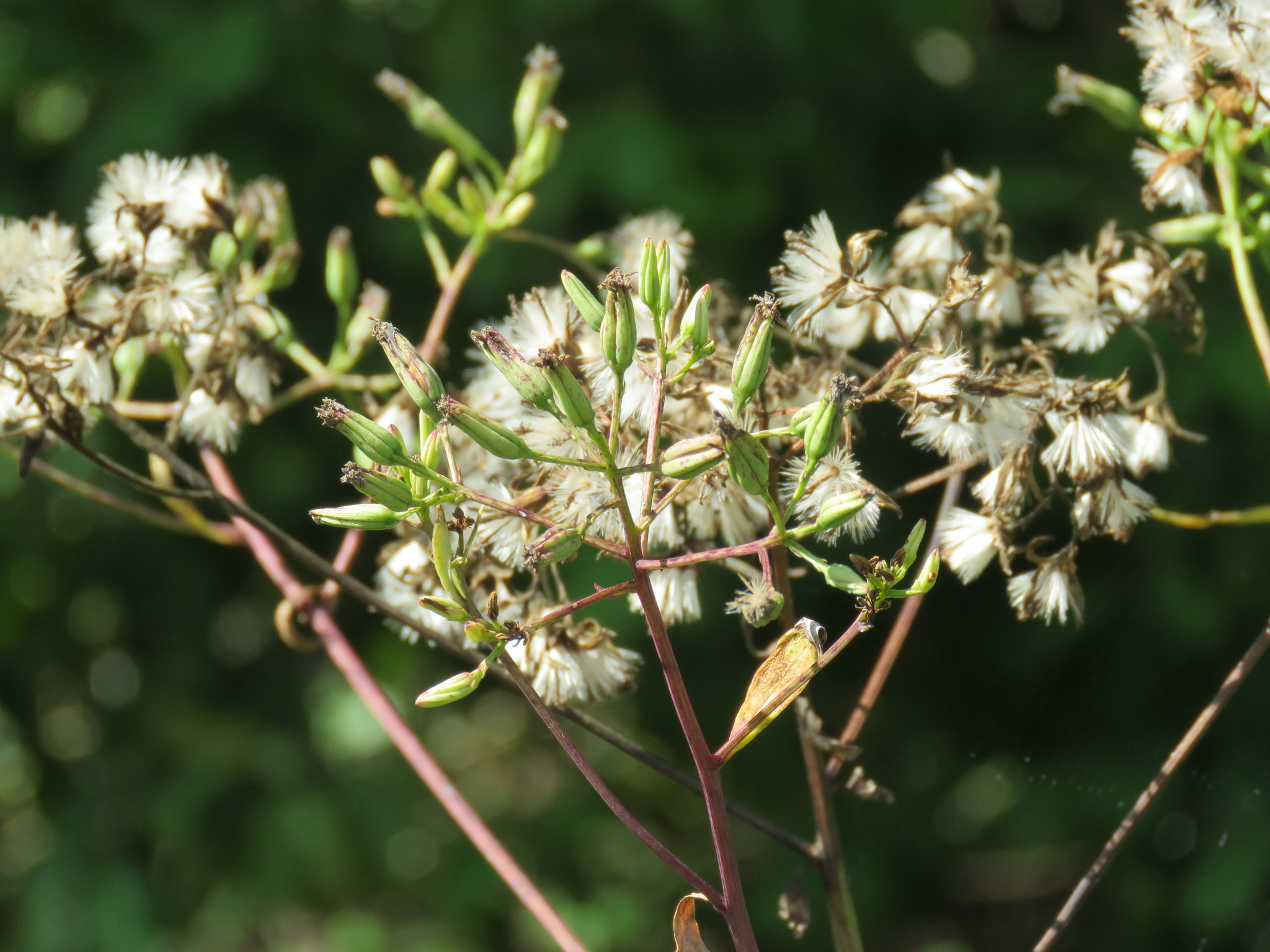

Scientific classification
- Kingdom: Plantae
- Clade: Tracheophytes
- Clade: Angiosperms
- Clade: Eudicots
- Clade: Asterids
- Order: Asterales
- Family: Asteraceae
- Genus: Arnoglossum
- Species: A. ovatum

Binomial name
- Arnoglossum ovatum (Walter) H.Rob.

Synonyms
- Synonymy: Arnoglossum ovatum var. lanceolatum (Nutt.) D.B.Ward; Cacalia elliottii (R.M.Harper) Shinners; Cacalia lanceolata Nutt.; Cacalia maxima (R.M.Harper ex R.M.Harper) Shinners; Cacalia ovata Walter; Conophora maxima Nieuwl.; Conophora ovata (Walter) Nieuwl.; Mesadenia angustifolia Rydb.; Mesadenia dentata Raf.; Mesadenia elliottii R.M.Harper; Mesadenia lanceolata (Nutt.) Raf.; Mesadenia maxima R.M.Harper; Mesadenia ovata (Walter) Raf.; Senecio boscianus Sch.Bip.; Senecio walteri Sch.Bip.

= Arnoglossum ovatum =

Species of flowering plant

Arnoglossum ovatum, the ovateleaf cacalia or broadleaf Indian-plantain, is a species of plant in the sunflower family. It is native to the southeastern and south-central United States from southern North Carolina to Florida and eastern Texas.

Arnoglossum ovatum is a large plant growing up to 300 cm (120 inches or 10 feet) tall. Flower heads are small but numerous, usually white or pale green, occasionally slightly purplish. The species grows in sandy woods, savannahs, and roadsides.
