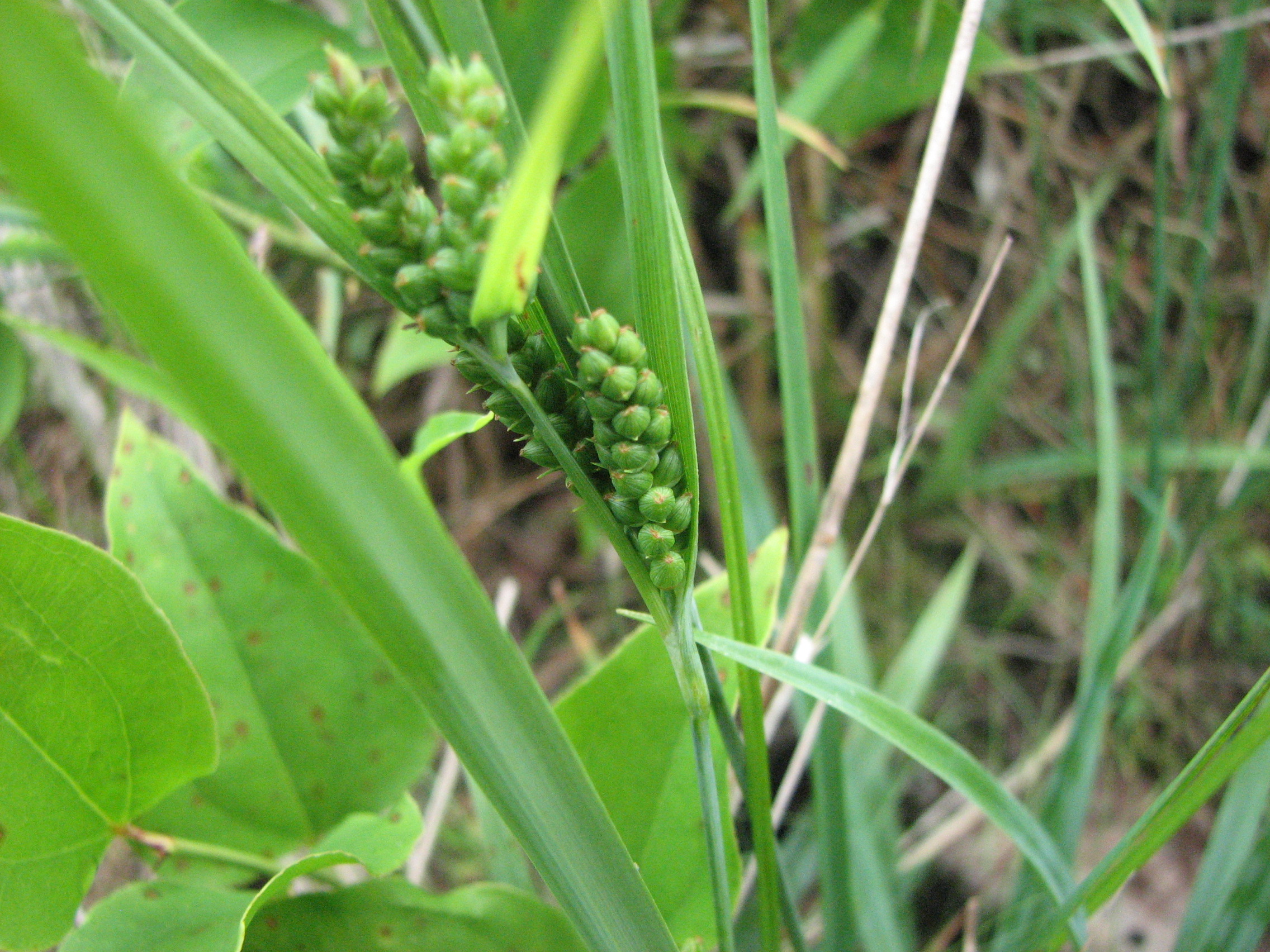
- Growing on serpentine
- Botanical illustration

Conservation status
- Secure (NatureServe)

Scientific classification
- Kingdom: Plantae
- Clade: Tracheophytes
- Clade: Angiosperms
- Clade: Monocots
- Clade: Commelinids
- Order: Poales
- Family: Cyperaceae
- Genus: Carex
- Species: C. glaucodea

Binomial name
- Carex glaucodea Tuck. ex Olney

Synonyms
- Carex flaccosperma var. glaucodea (Tuck. ex Olney) Kük.

= Carex glaucodea =

Species of plant

Carex glaucodea, the blue wood sedge or blue sedge (names it shares with other members of its genus), is a species of flowering plant in the family Cyperaceae. It is native to southern Ontario and the central and eastern United States. A rhizomatous perennial reaching 20 in (50 cm), it prefers moist soils and partial shade but can handle drier conditions and anthropogenically disturbed areas.
