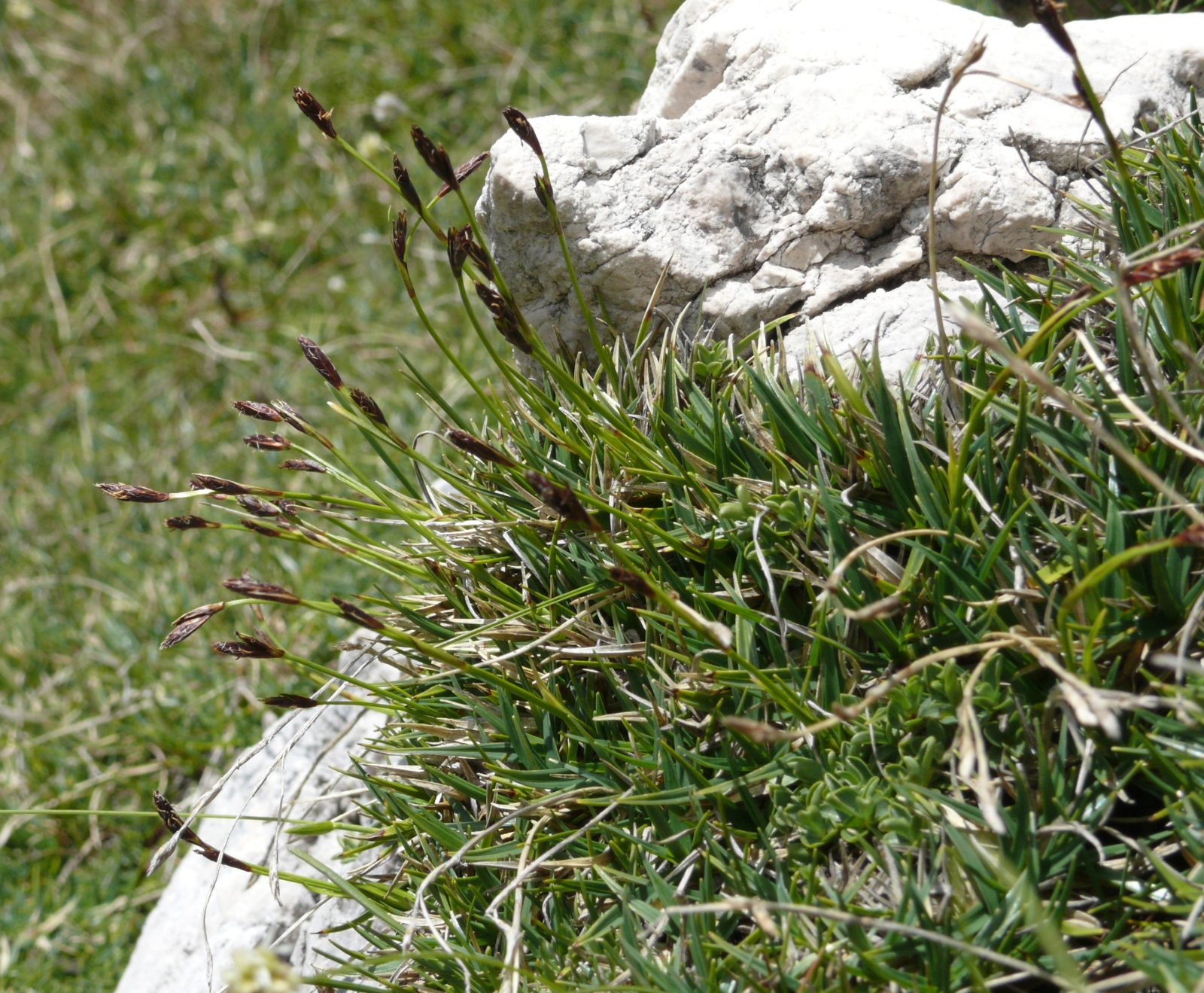

Scientific classification
- Kingdom: Plantae
- Clade: Tracheophytes
- Clade: Angiosperms
- Clade: Monocots
- Clade: Commelinids
- Order: Poales
- Family: Cyperaceae
- Genus: Carex
- Subgenus: Carex subg. Carex
- Section: Carex sect. Frigidae
- Species: C. firma

Binomial name
- Carex firma Host

= Carex firma =

Species of grass-like plant

Carex firma is a species of sedge that grows in the mountains of southern and central Europe.

== Description ==
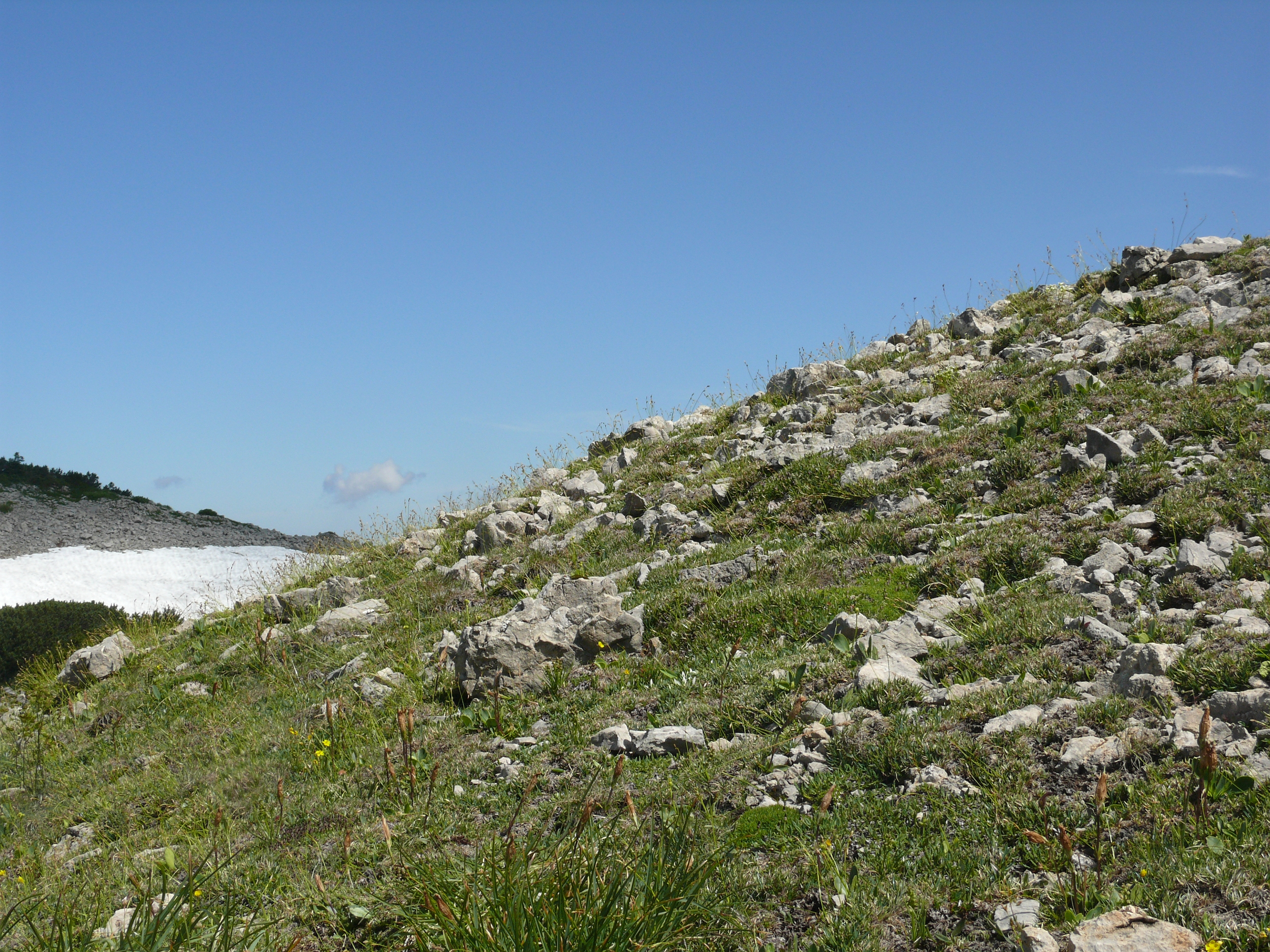
"Caricetum firmae" community in the Austrian Allgäuer Alpen, including species such as Carex firma, Chamorchis alpina, Dryas octopetala, Gentiana clusii and Primula auricula

Carex firma forms thick cushions. Its leaves are up to 8 centimetres (3.1 in) long in normal conditions (up to 10 cm or 4 in in moist, sheltered localities), dark green and stiff. The stems are up to 20 cm (7.9 in) tall (exceptionally 30 cm or 12 in), but always at least twice as long as the leaves.

== Ecology ==
In synecology, Carex firma is a characteristic part of the "Caricetum firmae" (also called "Firmetum"), which is an important community in the alpine zone over calcareous rock.

Carex firma can survive temperatures as low as −50 °C (−58 °F).

== Taxonomy ==
Carex firma was first described by Nicolaus Thomas Host in 1797, in his work Synopsis Plantarum in Austria provinciisque adjacentibus sponte crescentium.
