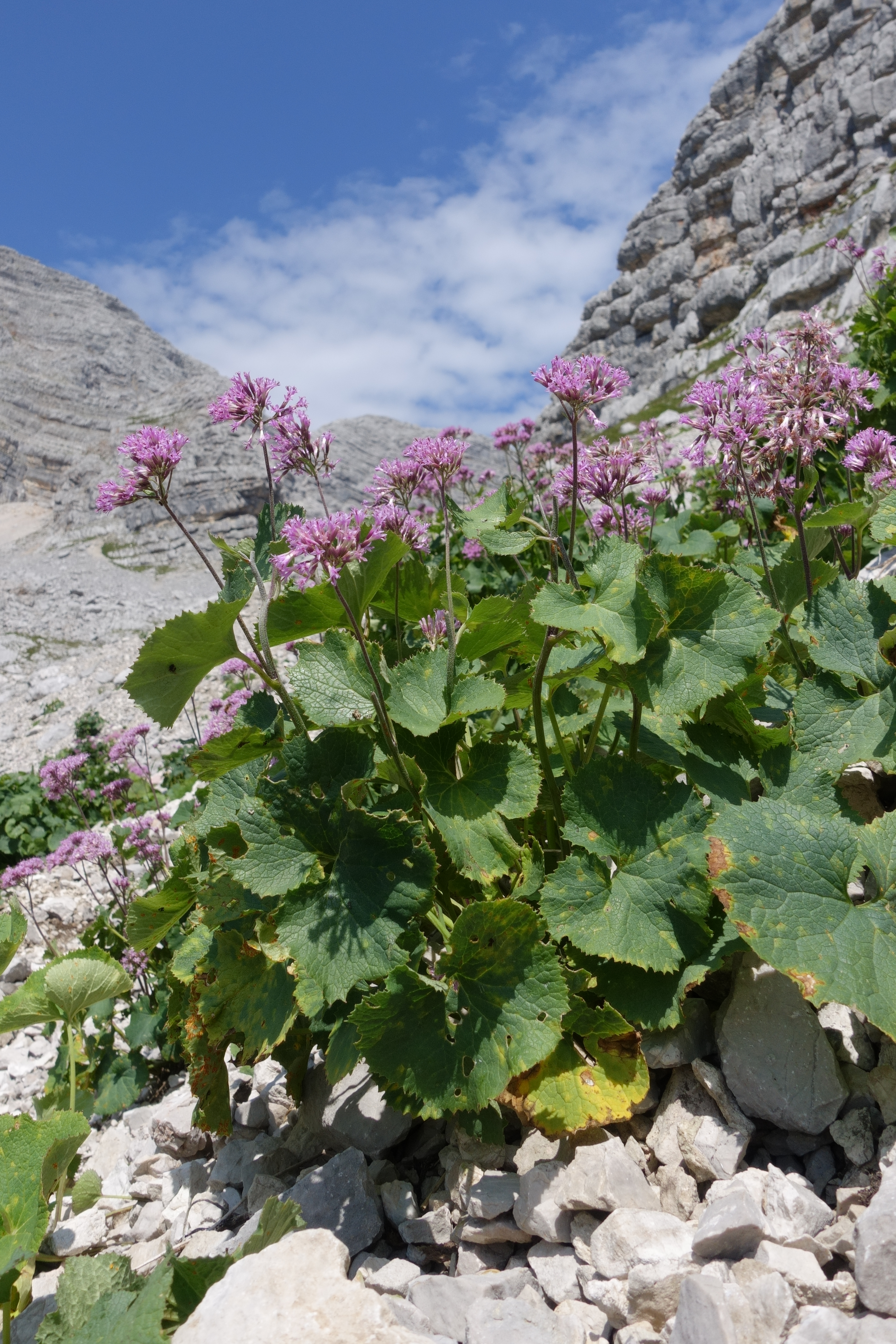
- Plant of Adenostyles alpina

Scientific classification
- Kingdom: Plantae
- Clade: Tracheophytes
- Clade: Angiosperms
- Clade: Eudicots
- Clade: Asterids
- Order: Asterales
- Family: Asteraceae
- Genus: Adenostyles
- Species: A. alpina

Binomial name
- Adenostyles alpina (L.) Bluff. & Fingerh.

Subspecies
- 4; see text

Synonyms
- Adenostyles glabra (Clairv.) DC.; Adenostyles calcarea Brügger; Adenostyles virdis Cass.; Cacalia alpina L.

= Adenostyles alpina =

Species of plant

Adenostyles alpina is herbaceous perennial plant belonging to the genus Adenostyles of the family Asteraceae. It is native to the Alps and southern Europe.

== Description ==
This plant grows to a height of about 60 centimetres (24 in). The inflorescence consists of dense corymbs hold by hairy peduncles. The small heads are usually composed of 3 to 4 flowers. The receptacle (the part that collects and maintains individual flowers) is naked or hairless. The flowers are of a tubular type and hermaphroditic. The corolla is cylindrical and pink violet. The length of the flower is of 7–8 mm. The period of flowering is from June until August.

Basal leaves are large, kidney-shaped, leaf margin is toothed. The leaves are glabrous on both sides. Size of leaves at the base: width 12–14 centimetres (4.7–5.5 in), length 10–11 centimetres (3.9–4.3 in). Cauline leaves are arranged in alternating fashion with successively smaller size and are petiolated. Size of lower cauline leaves: width 10–14 centimetres (3.9–5.5 in), length 6–8 centimetres (2.4–3.1 in).

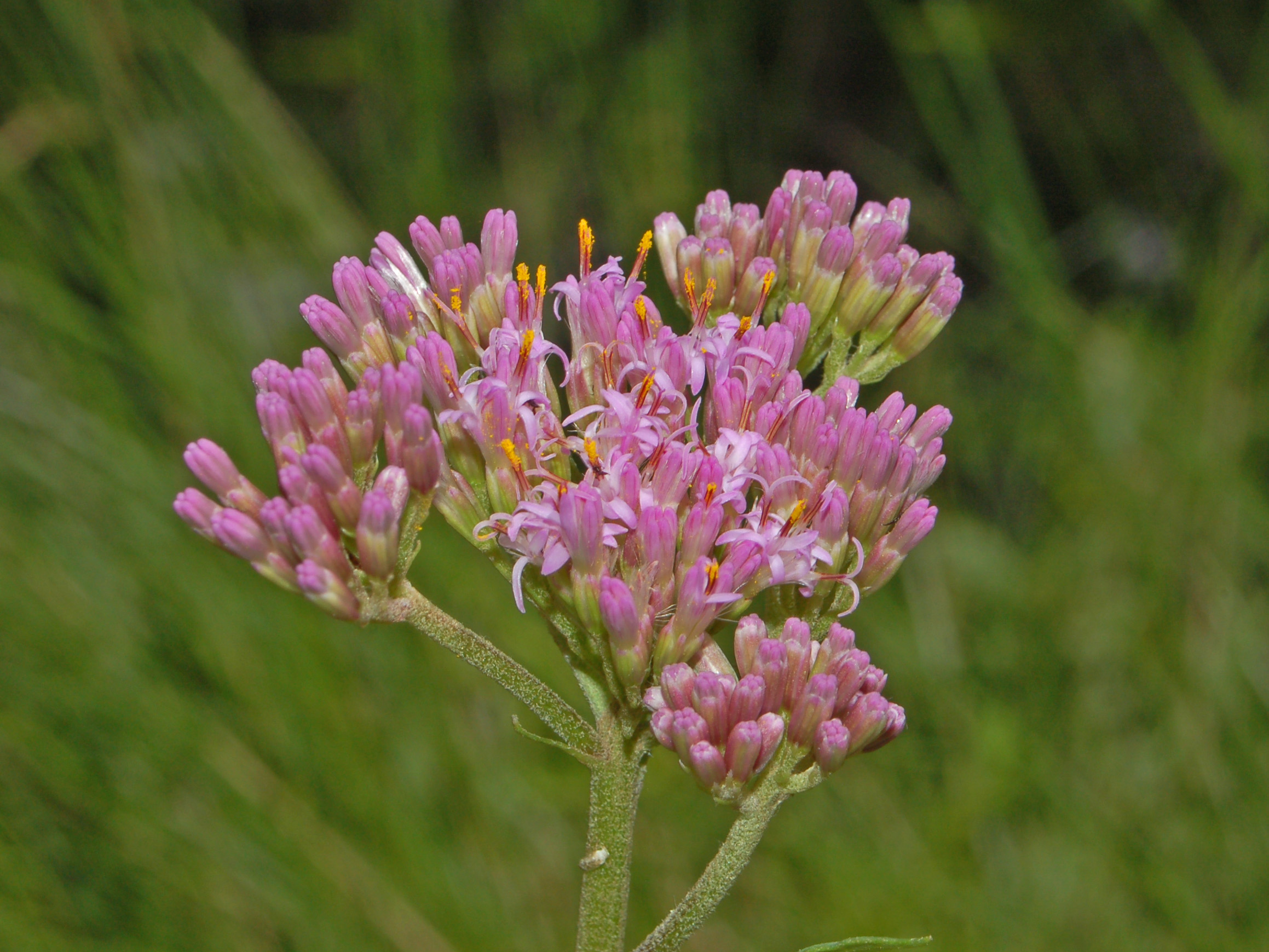
Inflorescence of Adenostyles alpina

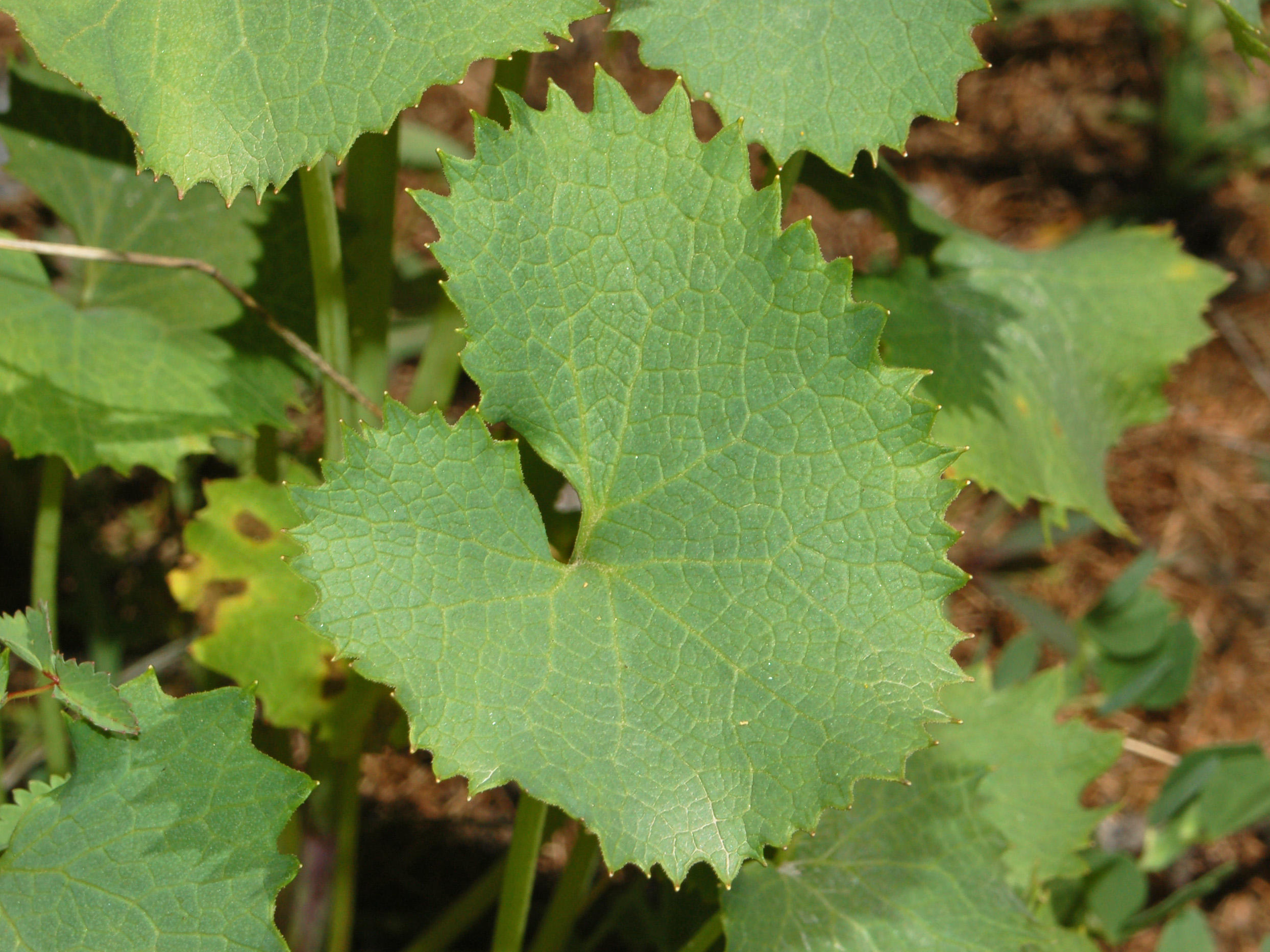
Leaf of Adenostyles alpina

== Distribution and habitat ==
Adenostyles glabra Is native to the mountains of southern Europe and to the Alps, ranging from Spain to Germany and Albania. The preferred habitat of this species is moist and shady places from 300–1,200 metres (980–3,940 ft) elevation.

== Subspecies ==
Four subspecies are accepted.

- Adenostyles alpina subsp. alpina – Alps to Albania
- Adenostyles alpina subsp. macrocephala (Huter, Porta & Rigo) Dillenb. & Kadereit – Italy
- Adenostyles alpina subsp. nebrodensis (Wagenitz & I.Müll.) Greuter – Sicily
- Adenostyles alpina subsp. pyrenaica (Lange) Dillenb. & Kadereit – Western, Central Pyrenees and northern Spain
