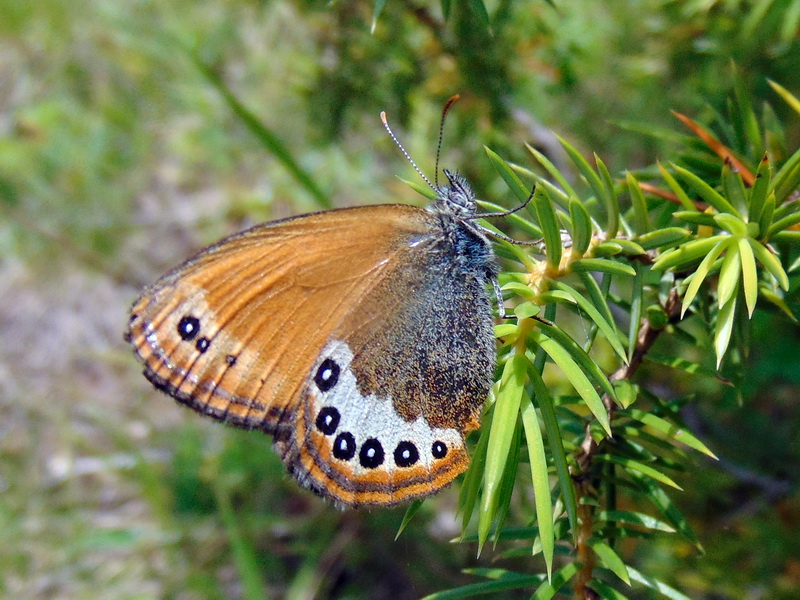

Scientific classification
- Kingdom: Animalia
- Phylum: Arthropoda
- Clade: Pancrustacea
- Class: Insecta
- Order: Lepidoptera
- Family: Nymphalidae
- Genus: Coenonympha
- Species: C. orientalis

Binomial name
- Coenonympha orientalis (Rebel, 1910)

= Coenonympha orientalis =

Species of butterfly

Coenonympha orientalis is a small butterfly found in the Palearctic that belongs to the browns family. It is found in the Balkans (Albania; Bosnia and Herzegovina, Greece, Montenegro, Serbia).

== Taxonomy ==
Coenonympha orientalis has previously been regarded as a subspecies of Coenonympha gardetta or of Coenonympha leander. Molecular data indicate differentiation of C. orientalis from both C. gardetta and C. leander. For more information

== See also ==
- List of butterflies of Europe
