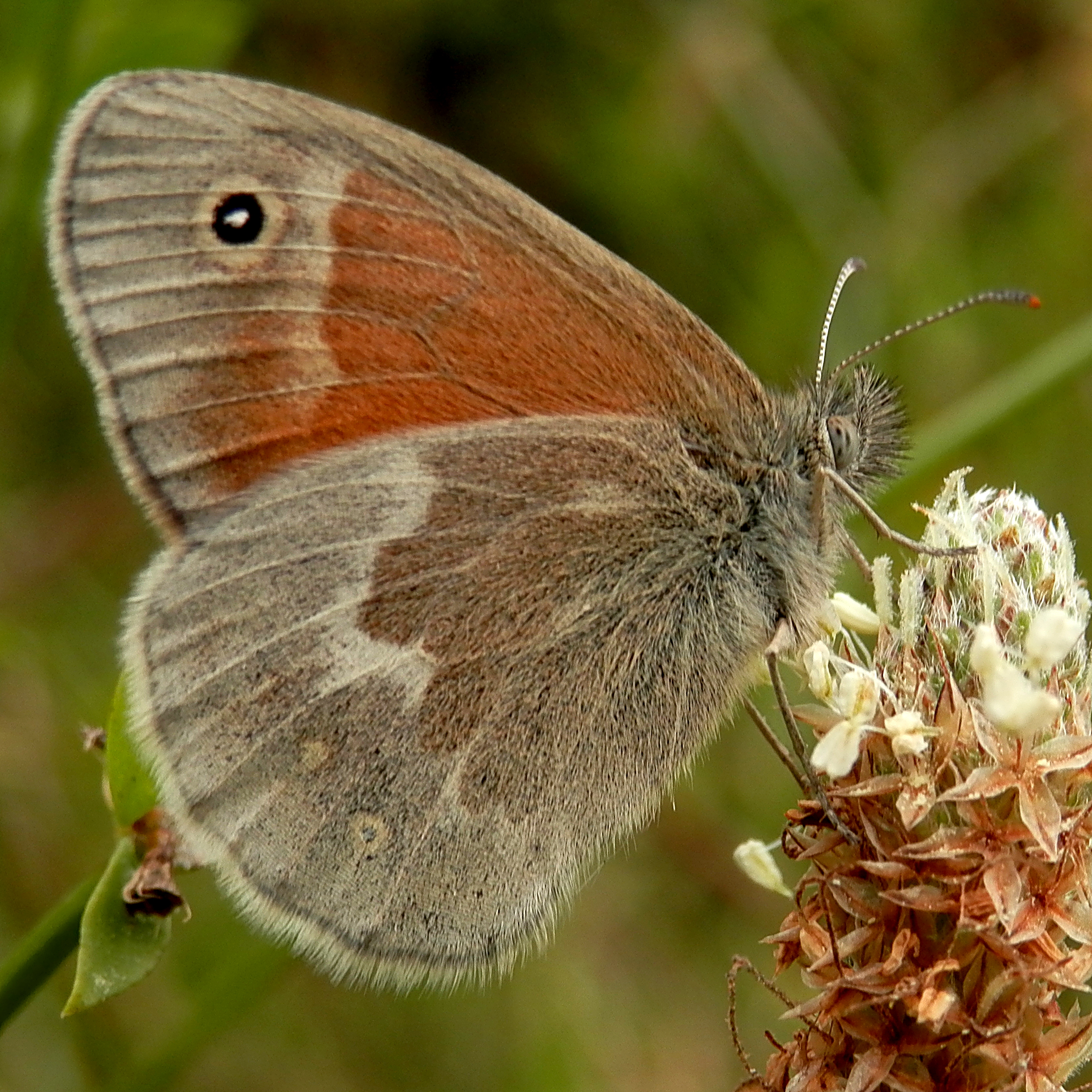

Conservation status
- Least Concern (IUCN 3.1)

Scientific classification
- Domain: Eukaryota
- Kingdom: Animalia
- Phylum: Arthropoda
- Class: Insecta
- Order: Lepidoptera
- Family: Nymphalidae
- Genus: Coenonympha
- Species: C. tullia

Binomial name
- Coenonympha tullia (Müller, 1764)

= Coenonympha tullia =

Species of butterfly

Coenonympha tullia, the large heath or common ringlet, is a butterfly in the family Nymphalidae. It flies in a variety of grassy habitats, including roadsides, woodland edges and clearings, prairies, bogs, and arctic and alpine taiga and tundra. It is a poor flyer, but can sometimes be found along ditches seeking new grounds. It is a holarctic species found in northern Europe, east across the Palearctic and across North America. The species was first described by Otto Friedrich Müller in 1764.

Successful reintroductions of the species to North West England took place in 2020, 2022 and 2023.

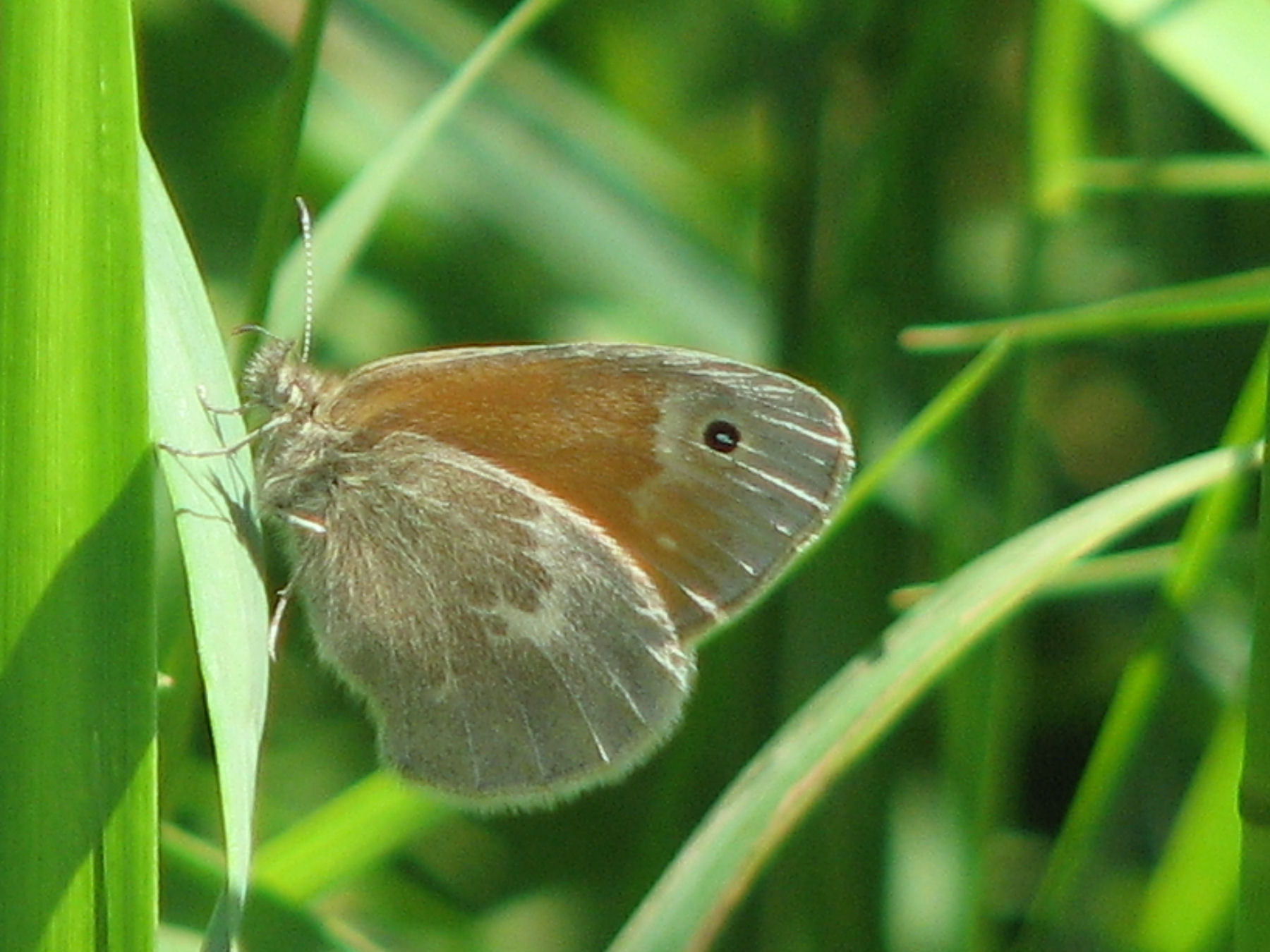
C. t. inornata, Ottawa, Ontario, Canada

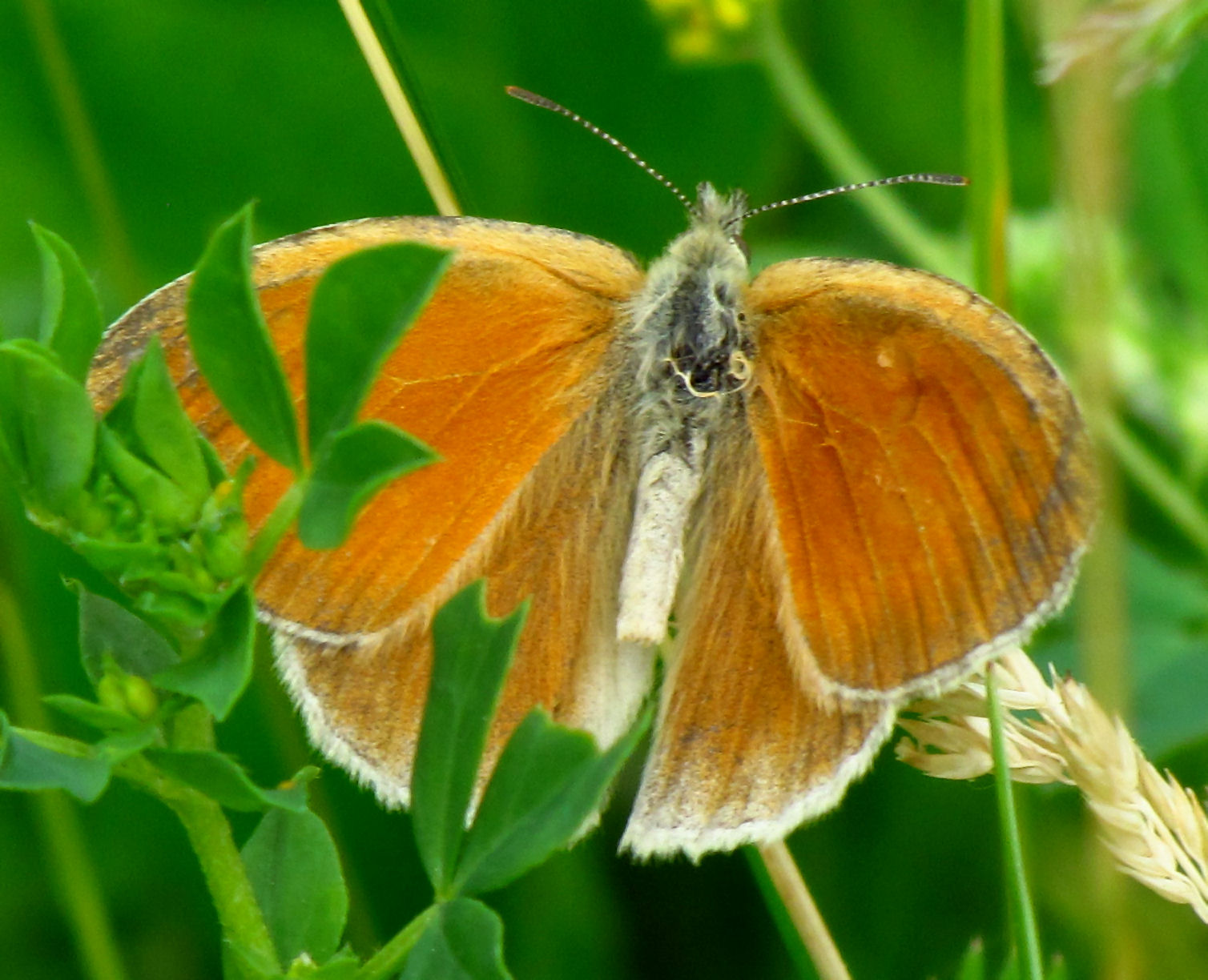
Dorsal view

== Description in Seitz ==
C. tiphon Rott. (— davus F., tullia Hbn.) (48h). Upperside sandy yellow, similar to Coenonympha symphita, rather duller; male without markings, female with the ocelli shining through. On the underside of the hindwing whitish smears are joined forming a more or less incomplete median band, beyond which there are some ocelli in the male and often a complete row in the female. In Central Europe, especially in the Alps, Central and Southern Germany and the Danube countries. — philoxenus Esp. (= rothliebi Stgr.) (48 h) is a rather large northern form, dulled with grey above and strongly ocellated below, from the continental shores of the North Sea and Great Britain, (said to have occurred also at Lemberg). — ab. laidion Bkh. is a slight deviation from the type, which is a little paler ochre-yellow on the upperside; it is probably found every-where exceptionally among the nymotypical form. -— isis Tnbg. (= demophile Fr.) (48h) has instead of a brown underside a grey one with fewer and smaller ocelli, and its upperside, which is absolutely without markings, is also of a greyish colour. Scandinavia, North Russia, as far as Central Asia. — viluiensis Mén. (= grisescens Christ.), from the Vilui river in Siberia and from the mountains of Werchojansk, north of Jakutsk, is on both sides bright grey, not yellow; the whitish median band of the underside of the hindwing shines through above and is shaded with grey towards the base; the base of the hindwing beneath washed with green. — caeca Stgr., from the Namangan Mts., is a small form without a trace of ocelli, so that it is superficially similar to pamphilus. — mixturata Alp. is the most eastern form of the Old World, from Kamschatka, and is without ocelli on both sides, like the American ochracea, but instead of being pale yellowish brown, like the latter, is pale grey above; on the underside the hindwing is grey, the forewing ochre yellow with a grey margin. — Across the Behring Sea, in Alaska, the species is represented by the closely allied form kodiak Edw. — The most western old-world form is scotica Stgr., which above has a dull grey ground-colour and dark edges. and beneath is without ocelli; from Ireland and Scotland. — subcaecata Ruhl, from the higher Altai, is an intermediate form, closely allied to ochracea from Colorado; it is darker and larger than caeca, but paler than isis; single specimens show vestiges of ocelli. — rhodopensis Elw. [now Coenonympha rhodopensis Elwes, 1900 ] a form from the Danubian countries, closely allied to isis, but yellowish brown on the upperside and rarely darker in the male.Of the ocelli on the underside only the pupil of the apical one and sometimes of one of the eyes on the hindwing shines through above. But on the underside of the hindwing this form mostly exhibits a complete row of ocelli, while in an otherwise closely related form, occupata Reb., they are entirely absent; the latter form occurs in Bosnia and Herzegovina. — Larva pale green, covered with minute dot-like warts, with a globular green head and yellow mouth, dark light-edged dorsal line, whitish subdorsal lines and pale yellow lateral stripe; anal claspers and anal fork rosy red. From September until May on rushes and reeds, such as Carex, Rhynchospora, Festuca, etc. Pupa pale green, abdomen whitish. — The butterflies are on the wing in June and July, singly, and on most flight-places not common. Sometimes quite fresh specimens are found in places where no single individual had been met with before in spite of decades of ardent collecting, and from where the species again disappeared for a long time. The flight-places are usually peat bogs and meadows flooded from time to time, according to Ruhl especially such on which Eriophorum grows.

== Subspecies ==
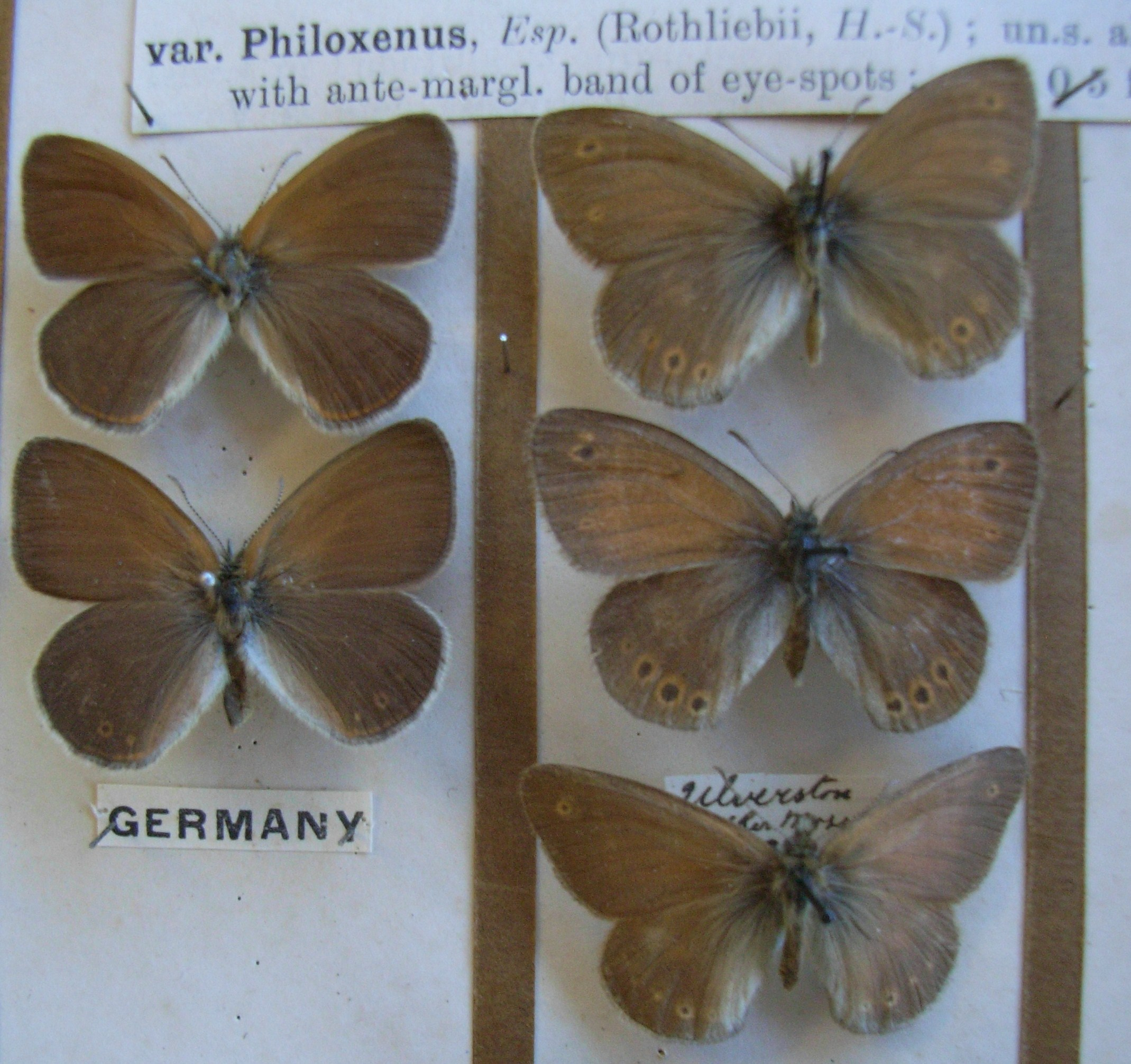
Coenonympha tullia var philoxenus

In alphabetical order:

- C. t. ampelos (W. H. Edwards, 1871) – northwest common ringlet
- C. t. benjamini (McDunnough, 1928) – prairie ringlet
- C. t. brenda
- C. t. bosniae (Davenport, 1941)
- C. t. columbiana (McDunnough, 1928) – ringlet
- C. t. davus (Fabricius, 1777)
- C. t. elko (W. H. Edwards, 1881)
- C. t. elwesi (Davenport, 1941)
- C. t. eryngii (H. Edwards, 1877)
- C. t. eunomia (Dornfeld, 1967)
- C. t. furcae (Barnes & Benjamin, 1926)
- C. t. gliwa
- C. t. haydenii (W. H. Edwards, 1872) – Hayden's common ringlet
- C. t. inornata (W. H. Edwards, 1861) – inornate common ringlet
- C. t. insulanus (McDunnough, 1928) – Vancouver ringlet
- C. t. kodiak (W. H. Edwards 1869) – Kodiak ringlet
- C. t. mackenziei (D. Davenport, 1936) – Mackenzie's ringlet
- C. t. mcisaaci (dos Passos, 1935) – McIsaac's ringlet
- C. t. mixturata (Alphéraky, 1897)
- C. t. mono (Burdick, 1942) – (common) ringlet
- C. t. ochracea (W. H. Edwards, 1861) – ochre (common) ringlet
- C. t. polydama (Haworth, 1803)
- C. t. pseudobrenda (Austin & R. Gray, 1998)
- C. t. scotica (Staudinger, 1901)
- C. t. sibirica (Davenport, 1941)
- C. t. subfusca (Barnes & Benjamin, 1926)
- C. t. suecica (Hemming, 1936)
- C. t. tullia (Müller, 1764) – common ringlet
- C. t. viluiensis (Ménétriés, 1859)
- C. t. yontocket (Porter & Mattoon, 1989) – Yontocket satyr ringlet
- C. t. yukonensis (W. Holland, 1900) – Yukon common ringlet

Formerly a subspecies:

- Coenonympha nipisiquit (McDunnough, 1939) – maritime ringlet
- Coenonympha california (Westwood, 1851) – California ringlet

For more information on subspecies and biology

== Etymology ==
Named in the Classical tradition. The Specific epithet tullia is related to Tullia, daughter of Servius Tullius, sixth Roman king, or daughter of Marcus Tullius Cicero, orator, writer and jurist.
