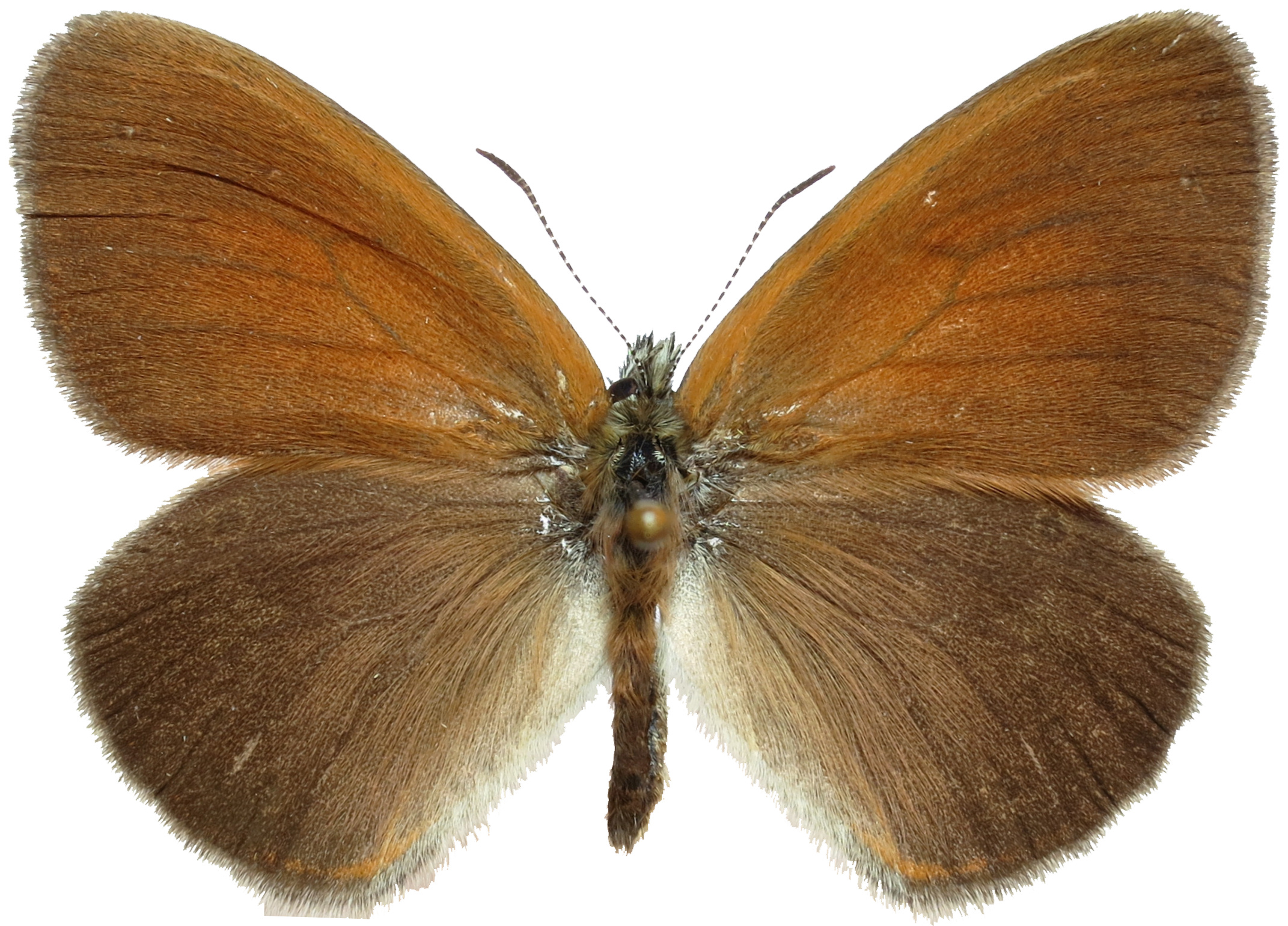
- C. glycerion male - Nickelheim, Bavaria, Germany
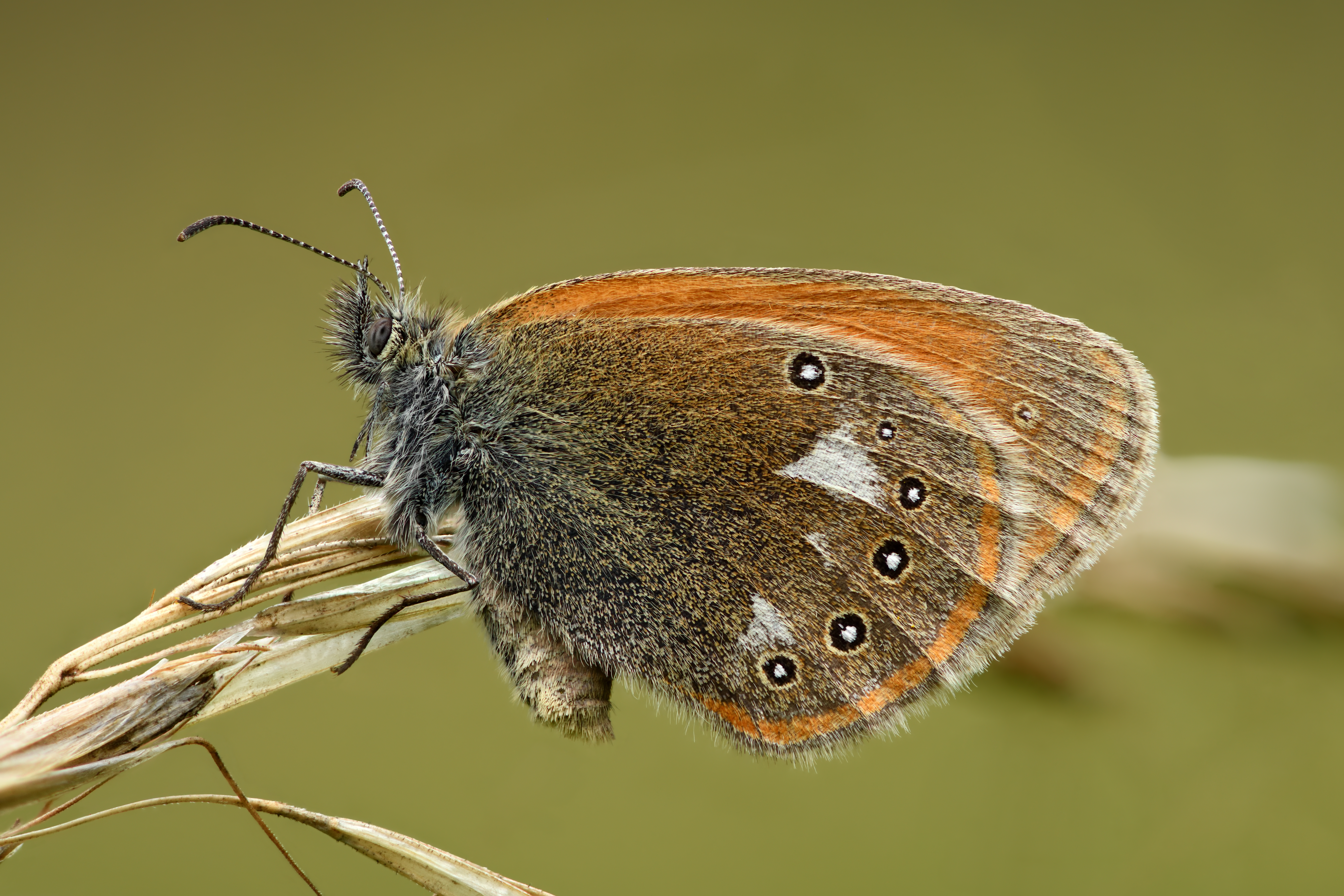
- Underside

Scientific classification
- Kingdom: Animalia
- Phylum: Arthropoda
- Clade: Pancrustacea
- Class: Insecta
- Order: Lepidoptera
- Family: Nymphalidae
- Genus: Coenonympha
- Species: C. glycerion

Binomial name
- Coenonympha glycerion Borkhausen, 1788

= Coenonympha glycerion =

Chestnut heath

Species of butterfly

Coenonympha glycerion, the chestnut heath, is a butterfly species belonging to the family Nymphalidae. It is also known as Coenonympha iphis. It can be found in Eastern Europe and east across the Palearctic to Siberia and the Caucasus to North Korea.

== Description ==
C. glycerion is a small orange-brown butterfly, similar in size to a small heath but with distinct eye-spots (ocelli) on its hindwing. The hindwing has several ocelli on the underside, often five or six. Beyond the middle are two large irregular white sinuous patches, either separate or thinly connected. The underside of the forewing is meanwhile either entirely without ocelli, or has a small, pale, ocellus near the tip of the wing.

There is some variation between sexes: the disc of the forewing of the male on the upperside is washed with copper-brown, while that of the female is yellowish brown, in varying shades. The hindwing is uniformly blackish brown.

The Larva is dull green with a blue-green head, a dark dorsal stripe, a pale lateral one, as well as a red anal fork; the spiracles yellowish red. The pupa is green with white-spotted abdomen and dark-edged wing-cases.

== Subspecies ==
Ssp. anaxagoras - Central & Eastern Europe. no metallic line on the underside, reduced ocelli on hindwing.

Ssp. iphicles/heroides - Very regular and distinct hindwing ocelli that appear on the upper side, resembling Coenonympha hero.

Ssp. carpathica - Found in the carpathian mountains. A smaller mountain form, with few or no ocelli on the hindwing.

Ssp. iphina - Central Asia. Underside ocelli have brown borders.

Ssp. mahometana - Considered by Seitz to be a subspecies, but in more modern papers often treated as the separate species Coenonympha mahometana. Tian-shan mountains. No ocelli or a few white dots, uniformly soot-brown upper side and a white dusting on the underside.

Ssp. iphioides - aka Coenonympha iphioides, also sometimes considered a subspecies of glycerion, but according to genetic evidence less closely related to it than mahometana.

== Distribution ==
C. glycerion is found throughout Central and a large part of Northern Europe, as well as in North and Central Asia.

== Habitat ==
C. glycerion prefers warm woodland edges with irregularly used grassland. Adalbert Seitz stated that they were typically found on grassy roads in woods and in damp meadows, with large numbers not often observed together. The very big-bodied females do not often rise more than 1-2 feet above the ground: when disturbed, they usually fly on only a few paces before settling again. Seitz suggested they followed the direction of roads when doing so.

== Life Cycle ==
The larvae feed on various grasses, and can be found on them through spring until May. The adult butterflies fly in one generation from June to August.

== Sources ==
- Species info
- BioLib
- "Coenonympha Hübner, [1819]" at Markku Savela's Lepidoptera and Some Other Life Forms
