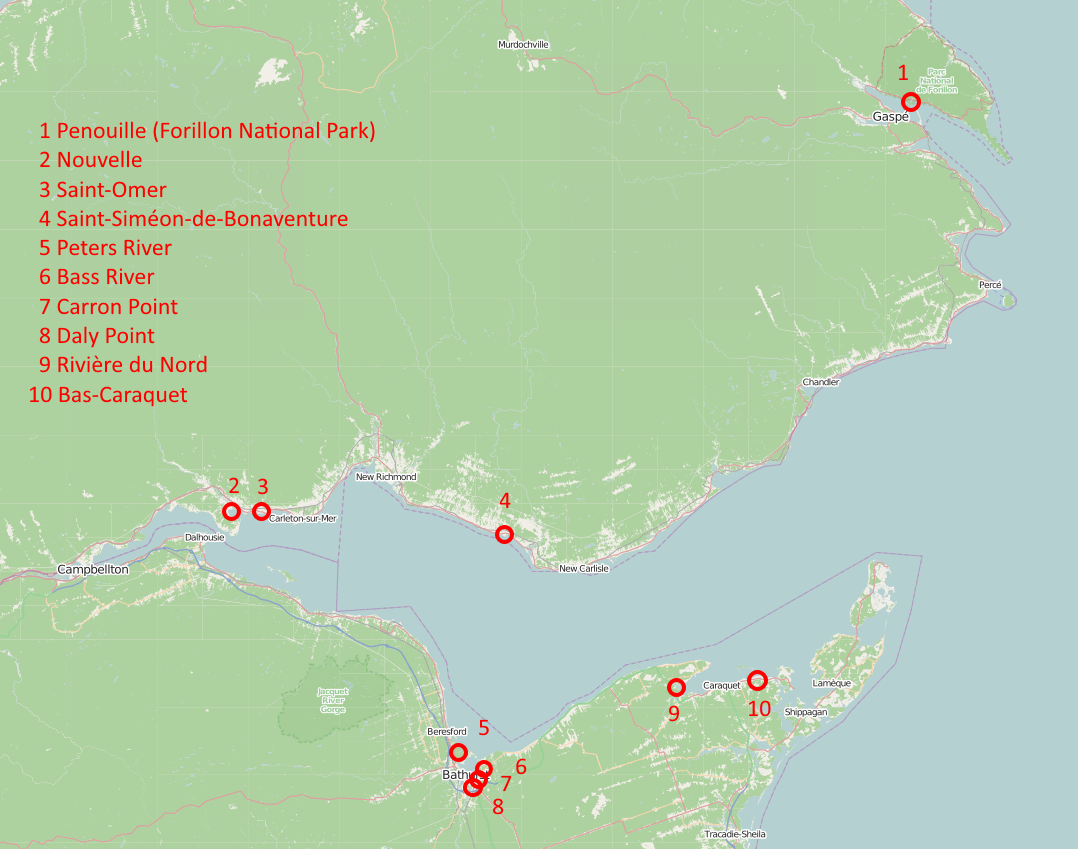

Scientific classification
- Domain: Eukaryota
- Kingdom: Animalia
- Phylum: Arthropoda
- Class: Insecta
- Order: Lepidoptera
- Family: Nymphalidae
- Genus: Coenonympha
- Species: C. nipisiquit

Binomial name
- Coenonympha nipisiquit McDunnough, 1939

= Coenonympha nipisiquit =

Maritime ringlet

Species of butterfly

Coenonympha nipisiquit, the maritime ringlet, is a rare butterfly in the family Nymphalidae. It is a "species at risk" in Canada due to water pollution and its limited range. Its range is restricted in Canada to the Chaleur Bay region, between New Brunswick and the Gaspé Peninsula.

== About ==
The species was discovered near Bathurst, New Brunswick by J. McDunnough in 1939. Of the six salt marshes where the maritime ringlet is found in New Brunswick, four of these sites are located within only a 10 km radius in or near Bathurst Harbour. The maritime ringlet is preyed on by birds and larger insects.

The larvae feed only on salt-meadow cordgrass (Spartina patens). Sea lavender (Limonium nashii) is its preferred nectar plant.

Dr. Reginald Webster, a self-employed Fredericton-based entomologist, was responsible from 1993 on for a WWF-funded project that led to the implementation of a recovery plan, monitoring protocol, and successful introduction of a new colony in the Acadian Peninsula.

== Similar species ==
Coenonympha tullia – common ringlet
