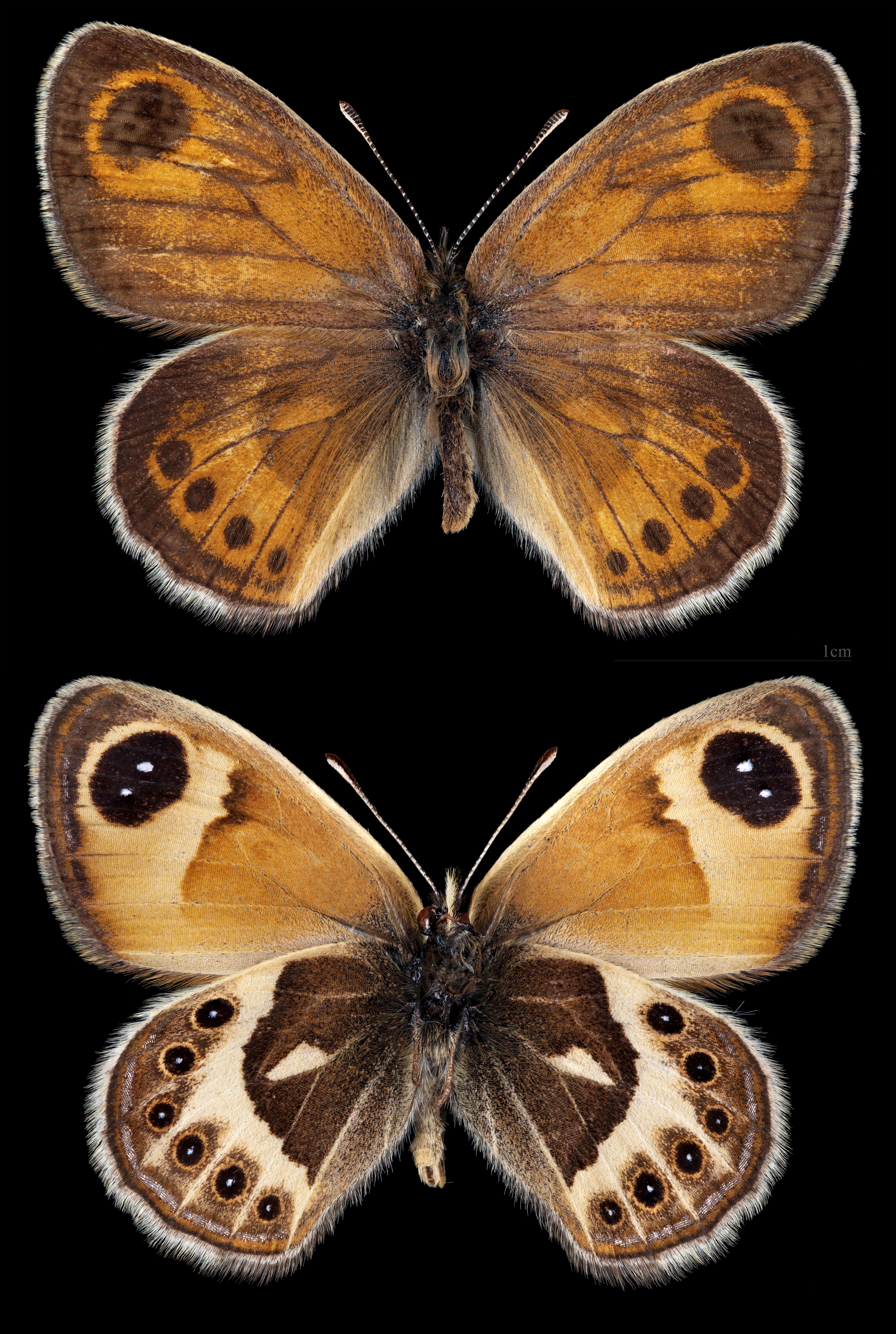

Scientific classification
- Kingdom: Animalia
- Phylum: Arthropoda
- Clade: Pancrustacea
- Class: Insecta
- Order: Lepidoptera
- Family: Nymphalidae
- Genus: Coenonympha
- Species: C. vaucheri

Binomial name
- Coenonympha vaucheri (Blachier, 1905)

= Coenonympha vaucheri =

Species of butterfly

Coenonympha vaucheri, or Vaucher's heath, is a butterfly that belongs to the family Nymphalidae and is endemic to Morocco.

== Description ==
The top side of the butterfly is ochre-yellow with a deep black distal edge with the forewing bearing a huge apical ocellus without a pupil. This gives the butterfly the appearance of having large eyes to ward off predators. Its hindwing has between four or five black spots lined up in a straight row. Underneath the wings the apical ocellus is pupiled, these may increase in number (ab. geminipuncta Blach). The base of the hindwing is a blackish olive-colour with a white highlight, the end portion of the wing is a dirty white colour and has six equally large pupiled ocelli.
