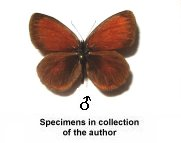

Scientific classification
- Domain: Eukaryota
- Kingdom: Animalia
- Phylum: Arthropoda
- Class: Insecta
- Order: Lepidoptera
- Family: Nymphalidae
- Genus: Coenonympha
- Species: C. nolckeni

Binomial name
- Coenonympha nolckeni (Erschoff, 1874)

= Coenonympha nolckeni =

Species of butterfly

Coenonympha nolckeni is a species of butterfly in the family Nymphalidae. It is found in parts of the Tian-Shan region, mainly Uzbekistan, and north and west Pamir Mountains. It is found in shrubby habitats and meadows at 2,000-3,300 m.

== Flight period ==
The species is univoltine, being on wing between the end of May and July, depending on altitude and locality.

== Food plants ==
Larvae feed on grasses.

== Sources ==
- Species info
- BioLib.cz
- "Coenonympha Hübner, [1819]" at Markku Savela's Lepidoptera and Some Other Life Forms
- Guide to the Butterflies of Russia and Adjacent Territories Volume 1. Pensoft, Sofia - Moscow. 1997
