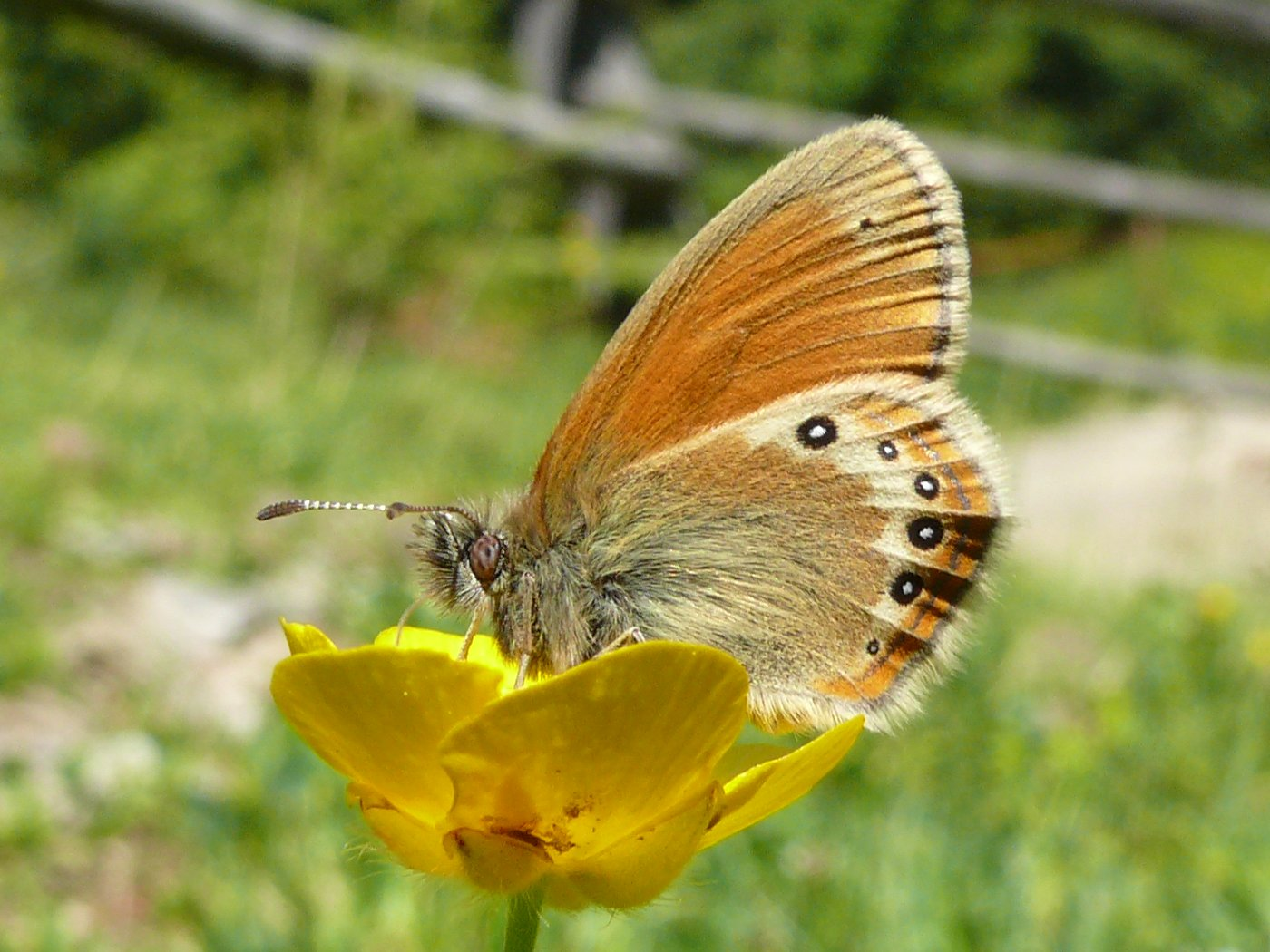
- Coenonympha darwiniana imago

Scientific classification
- Kingdom: Animalia
- Phylum: Arthropoda
- Clade: Pancrustacea
- Class: Insecta
- Order: Lepidoptera
- Family: Nymphalidae
- Tribe: Satyrini
- Subtribe: Coenonymphina
- Genus: Coenonympha; Hübner, 1819

Species
- Numerous, see text

= Coenonympha =

Genus of butterflies

Coenonympha is a butterfly genus belonging to the Coenonymphina, a subtribe of the browns (Satyrinae). The latter are a subfamily of the brush-footed butterflies (Nymphalidae). As a rule, Palearctic species are colloquially called heaths, while Nearctic ones are called ringlets. Neither term is limited to members of this genus, however.

== Selected species ==
Listed alphabetically:

- Coenonympha amaryllis Stoll, 1782
- Coenonympha ampelos Edwards, 1871 – northwest ringlet
- Coenonympha arcania (Linnaeus, 1761) – pearly heath
- Coenonympha arcanioides Pierret, 1837 – Moroccan pearly heath
- Coenonympha caeca Staudinger, 1886
- Coenonympha california Westwood, 1851 – California ringlet
- Coenonympha corinna (Hübner, 1804) – Corsican heath [Corsica, Sardinia, Elba]
- Coenonympha darwiniana Staudinger, 1871 (sometimes in C. gardetta, or C. arcania × C. gardetta)
  - Coenonympha (darwiniana) macromma Turati & Verity 1910
- Coenonympha × decolorata Wagner, 1913 (= C. mahometana × C. sunbecca)
- Coenonympha dorus (Esper, 1782) – dusky heath
- Coenonympha fettigii Oberthür, 1874
- Coenonympha gardetta (de Prunner, 1798) – Alpine heath [Alps, northern Balkans]
- Coenonympha glycerion (Borkhausen, 1788) – chestnut heath
- Coenonympha haydenii Edwards, 1872 – Hayden's ringlet, Wyoming ringlet, Yellowstone ringlet
- Coenonympha hero (Linnaeus, 1761) – scarce heath
- Coenonympha inornata Edwards, 1861 – prairie ringlet
- Coenonympha iphioides Staudinger, 1870 – Spanish heath
- Coenonympha kodiak Edwards, 1869 – Kodiak ringlet
- Coenonympha leander Esper, 1784 – Russian heath
- Coenonympha mahometana Alphéraky, 1881
- Coenonympha mangeri Bang Haas, 1927
- Coenonympha mongolica Alphéraky, 1881
- Coenonympha nipisiquit McDunnough, 1939 – maritime ringlet
- Coenonympha nolckeni Erschoff, 1874
- Coenonympha ochracea Edwards, 1861 – ocher ringlet
- Coenonympha oedippus (Fabricius, 1787) – false ringlet
- Coenonympha orientalis Rebel, 1909
- Coenonympha pamphilus (Linnaeus, 1758) – small heath
- Coenonympha pavonina Alphéraky, 1888
- Coenonympha rhodopensis Elwes, 1900 – eastern large heath [Italy, Romania, Bulgaria, Albania, N.Greece, Yugoslavia]
- Coenonympha saadi Kollar, 1849
- Coenonympha semenovi Alphéraky, 1887
- Coenonympha sinica Alphéraky, 1888
- Coenonympha sunbecca Eversmann, 1843
- Coenonympha symphita Lederer, 1870
- Coenonympha thyrsis Freyer, 1845
- Coenonympha tullia (Müller, 1764) – large heath, common ringlet
- Coenonympha tydeus Leech, 1892
- Coenonympha vaucheri Blachier, 1905 – Vaucher's heath
- Coenonympha xinjiangensis Chou & Huang, 1994

== Gallery ==
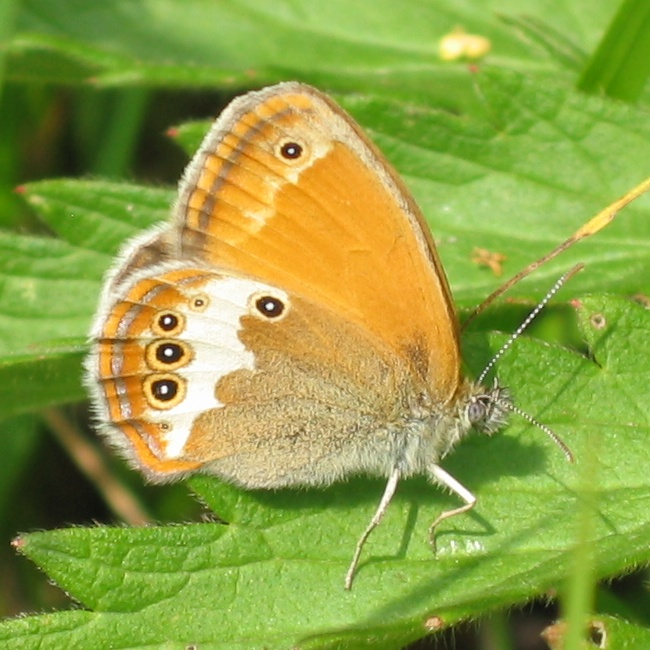
Coenonympha arcania

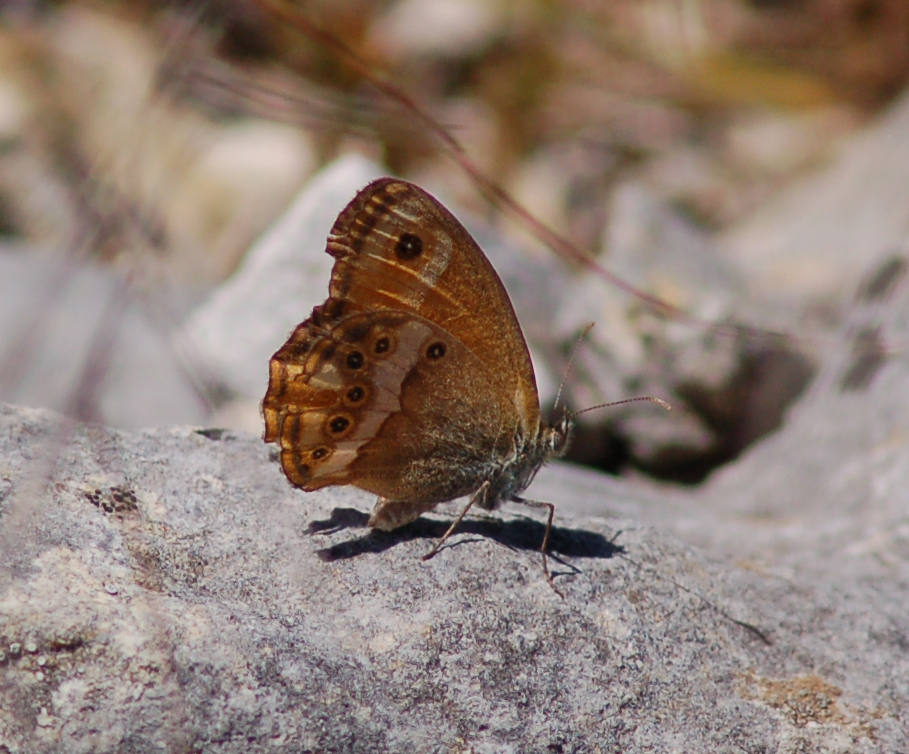
Coenonympha dorus

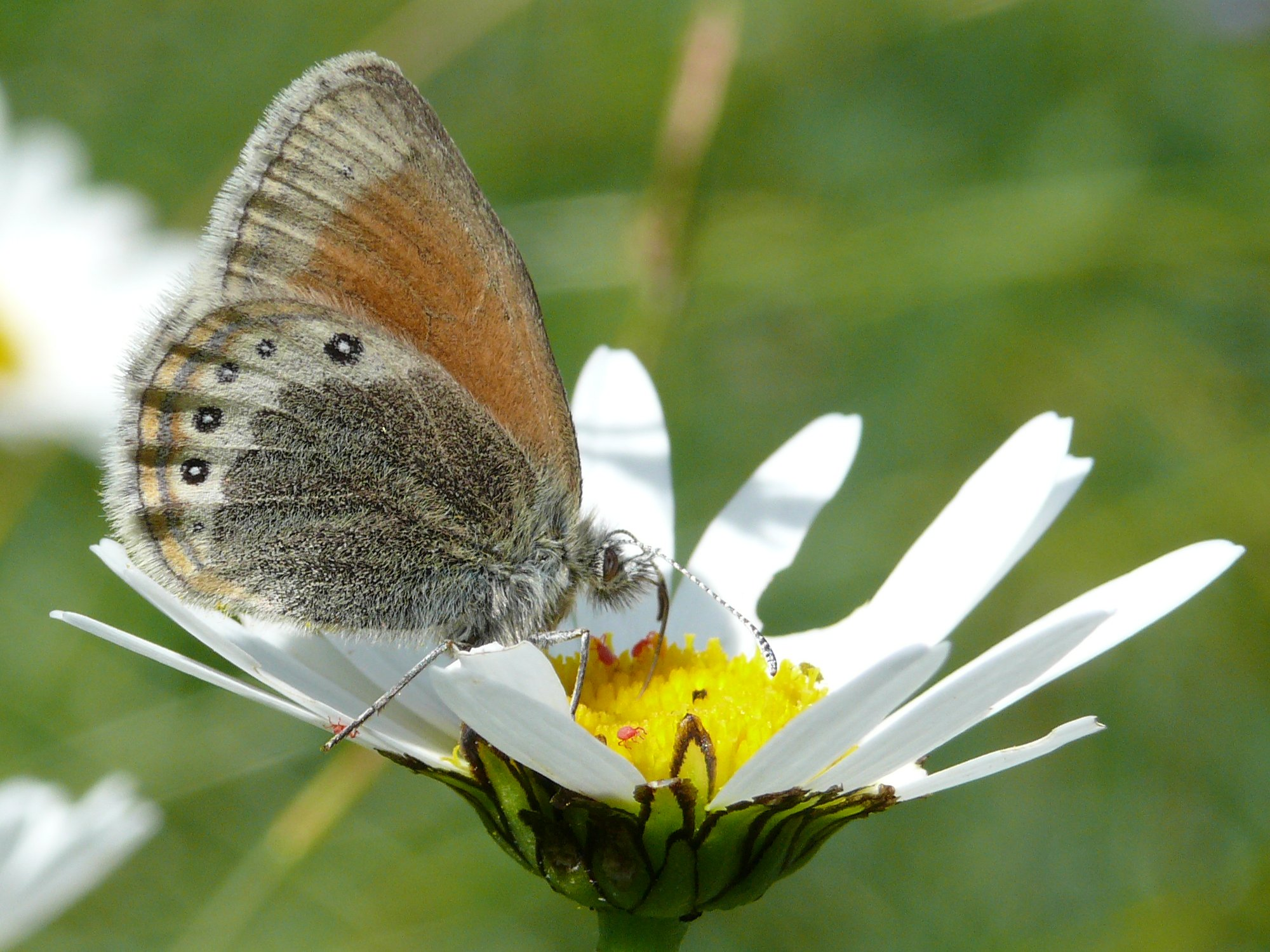
Coenonympha gardetta

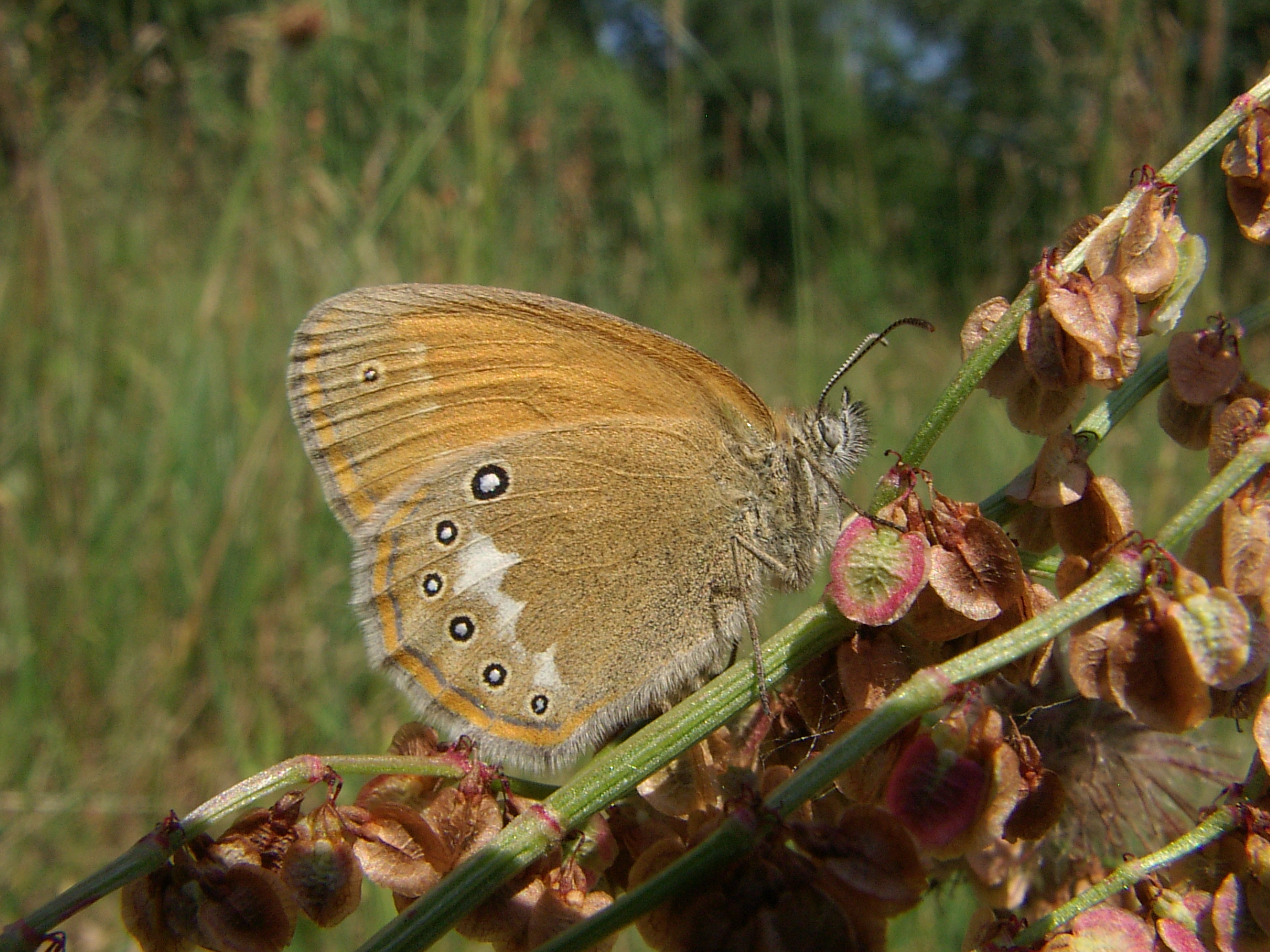
Coenonympha glycerion

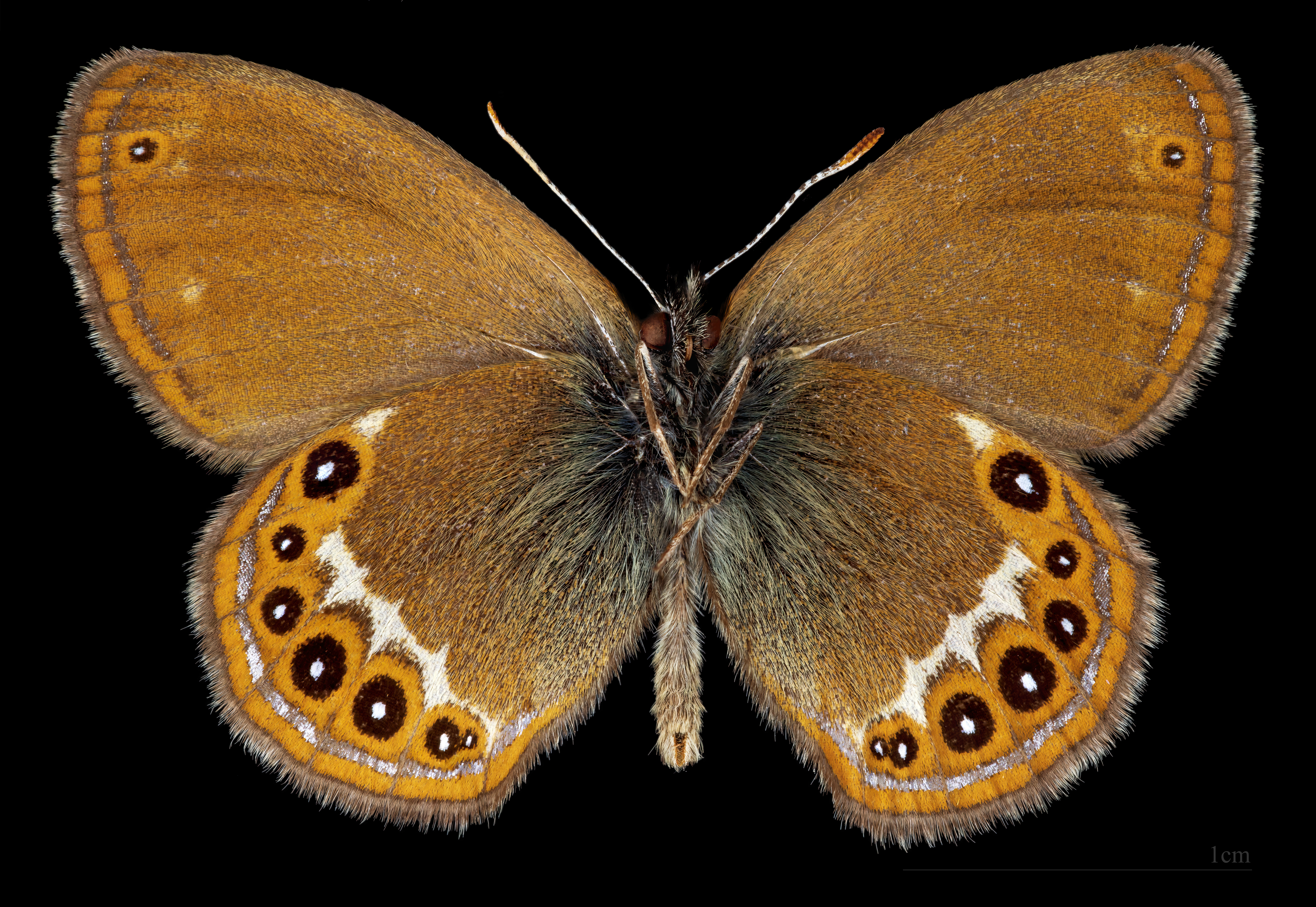
Coenonympha hero

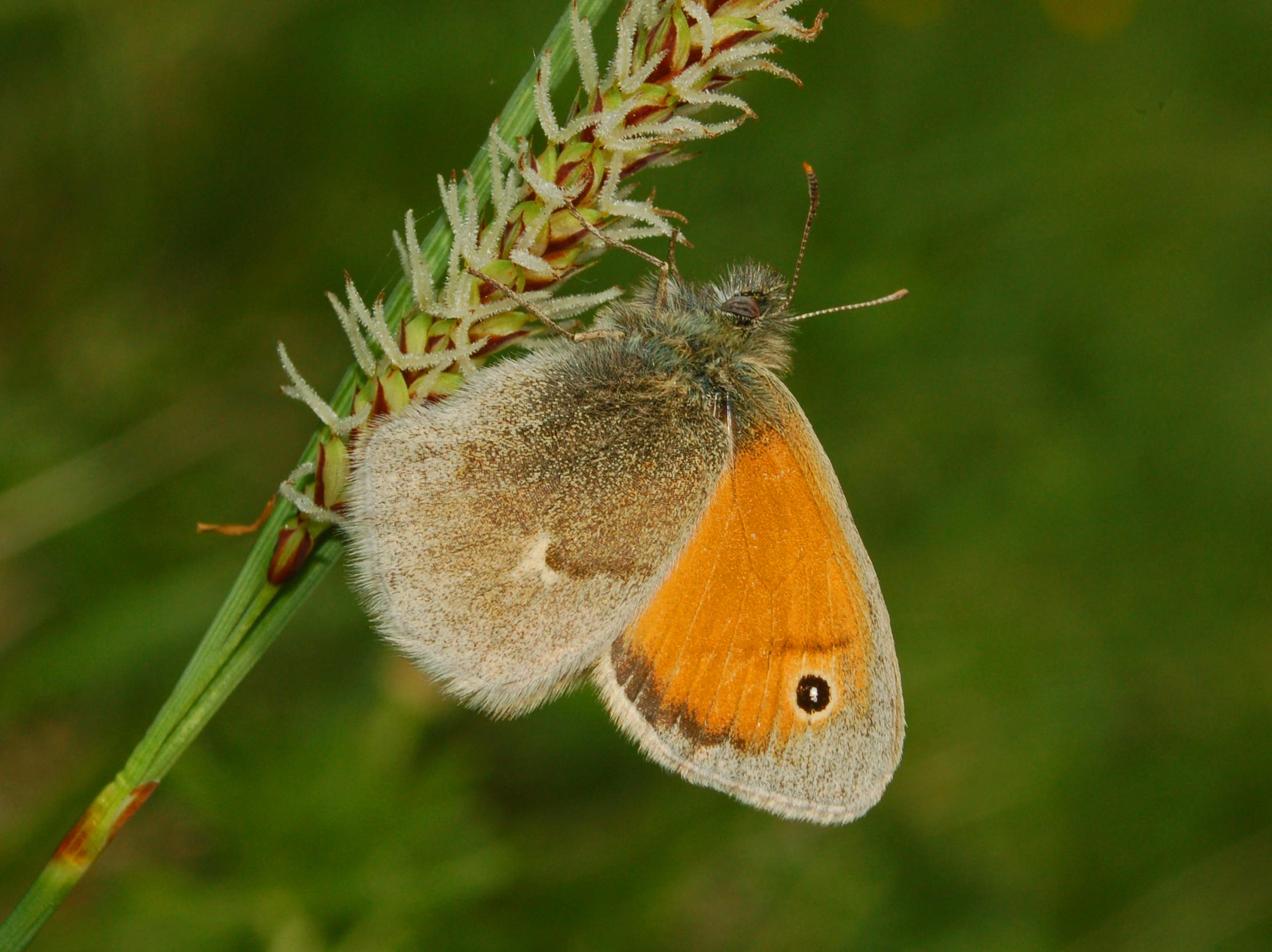
Coenonympha pamphilus

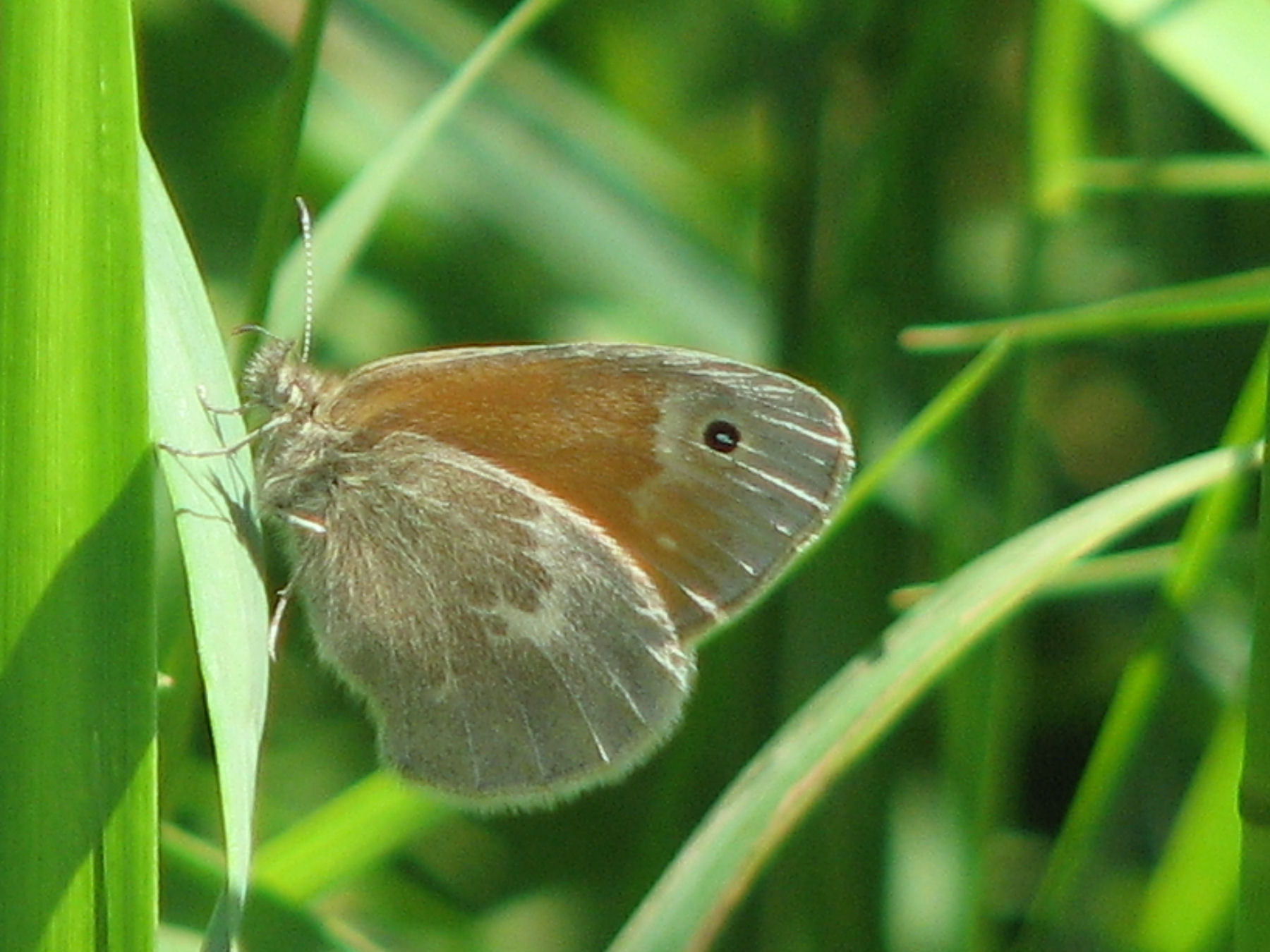
Coenonympha tullia

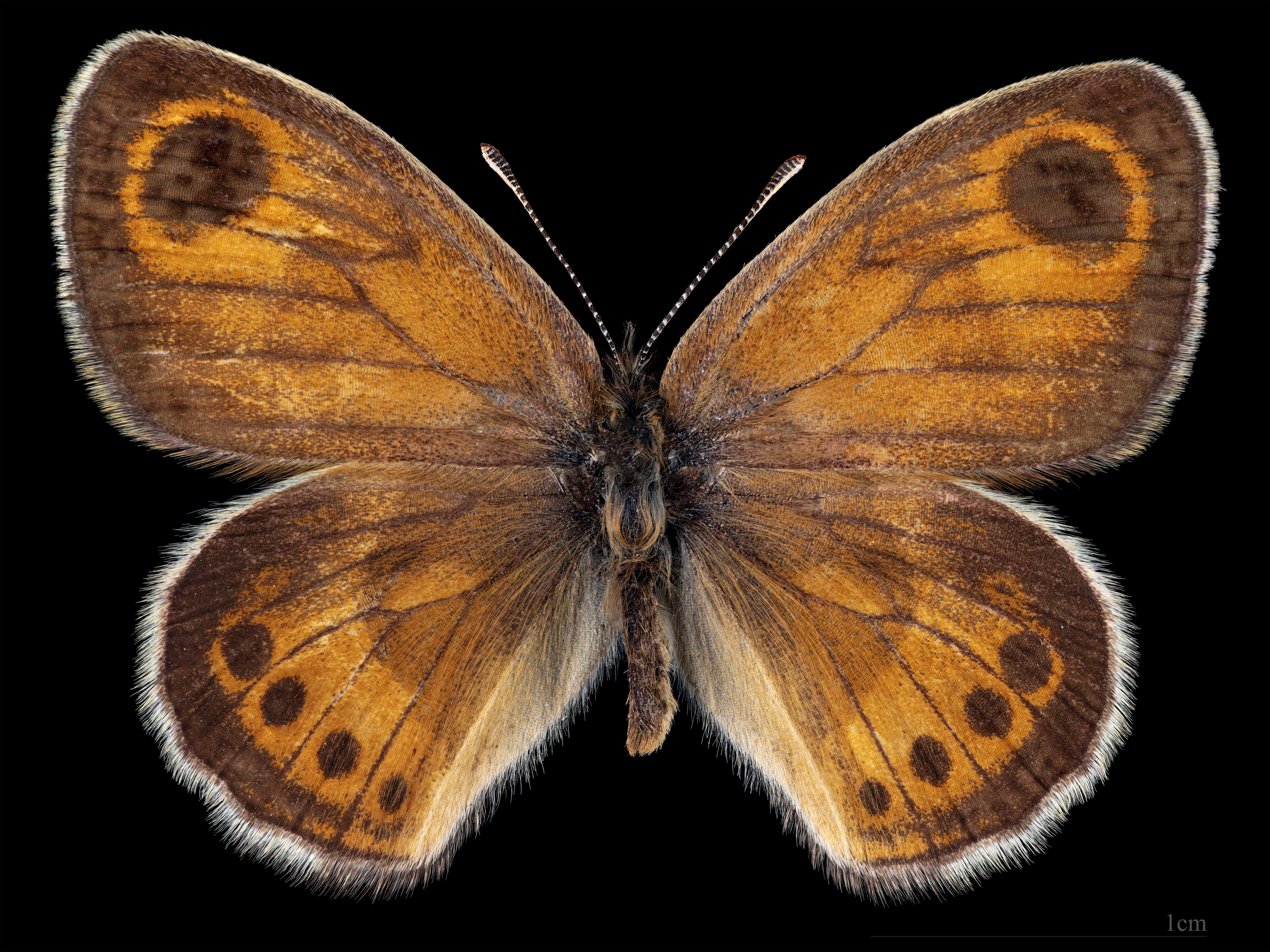
Coenonympha vaucheri
