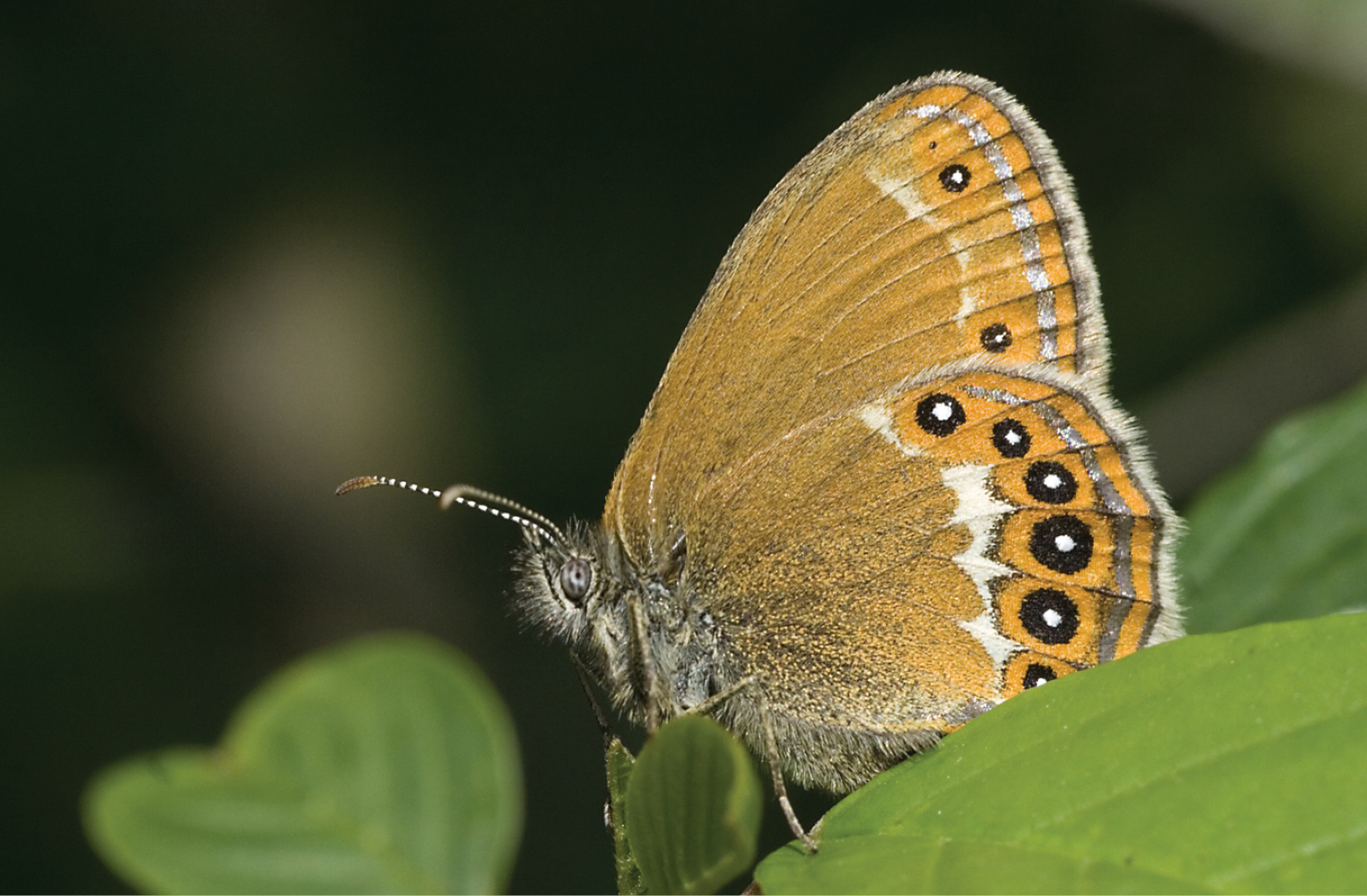

Scientific classification
- Kingdom: Animalia
- Phylum: Arthropoda
- Clade: Pancrustacea
- Class: Insecta
- Order: Lepidoptera
- Family: Nymphalidae
- Genus: Coenonympha
- Species: C. hero

Binomial name
- Coenonympha hero Linnaeus, 1761

= Coenonympha hero =

Species of butterfly

Coenonympha hero, the scarce heath, is a butterfly species belonging to the family Nymphalidae.

== Distribution ==
It can be found in Central Europe, Northern Europe and the North Palearctic (Urals East to Mongolia, Korea and Japan).

== Description ==
It resembles Coenonympha arcania.In Seitz it is described "On the upperside resembles Coenonympha oedippus smaller and just as dark, but on the hindwing 2 or 3 ocelli shine through from beneath as yellowish brown rings. On the underside itself the ocelli are placed in orange rings, and on their basal side there is a straight white line, which is thickened into knots on the veins. Northern and Central Europe and the whole of Northern Asia, from Sweden as far as the Alps, and from Belgium eastwards to the Pacific Ocean and Japan. ab. stolida Schilde, from Scandinavia, is smaller and darker, and the forewing bears a white distal band on their underside. In ab. perseis Led. [subspecies] (= sibirica Stgr.) (48a), which in Eastern Asia occurs among the nymotypical form, but locally also flies alone, the white band before the row of ocelli on the underside of the hindwing is much widened. — Fruhstorfer separates from this form, as neoperseis[subspecies], the specimens from Hokkaido, which are larger. — In ab. areteoides Fol., which is recorded from Belgium, the ocelli on the hindwing are obsolete. — Larva pale green, on lyme-grass (Elymus) and wood-grasses. In Europe the butterflies are on the wing in June and July, in Eastern Asia according to Graeser in two broods; in woods of leaved trees and in meadows « overgrown with bushes. The specimens of hero rise higher in the air in their flight than the pale species of Coenonympha, and slightly recall small Erebias; they occur more singly and usually very locally, and one does not easily catch more than a few specimens in one day.

== Subspecies ==
- Coenonympha hero latefasciata (Matsumura, 1925) Kunashir
- Coenonympha hero perseis (Lederer, 1853) Asia to the Pacific
- Coenonympha hero pilwonis (Matsumura, 1925) Sakhalin
- Coenonympha hero sabaeus (Fabricius, 1775) Northeast Europe and West Siberia
- Coenonympha hero neoperseis Fruhstorfer, 1908 Japan
- Coenonympha hero coreana Matsumura, 1927, Korea
- Coenonympha hero sabaeus Fabricius, 1775, Eastern Europe, Urals, West Siberia
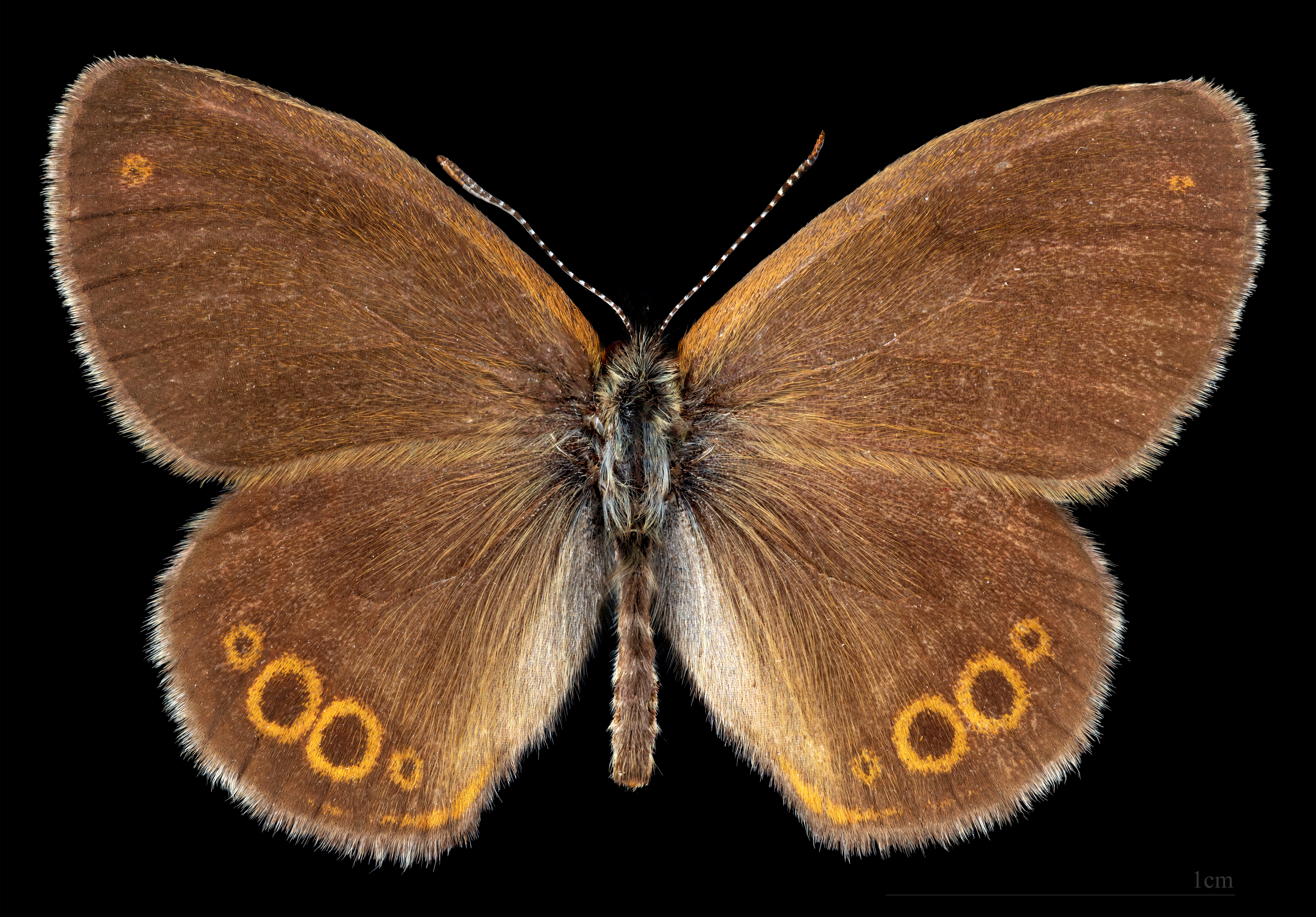
Coenonympha hero ♂

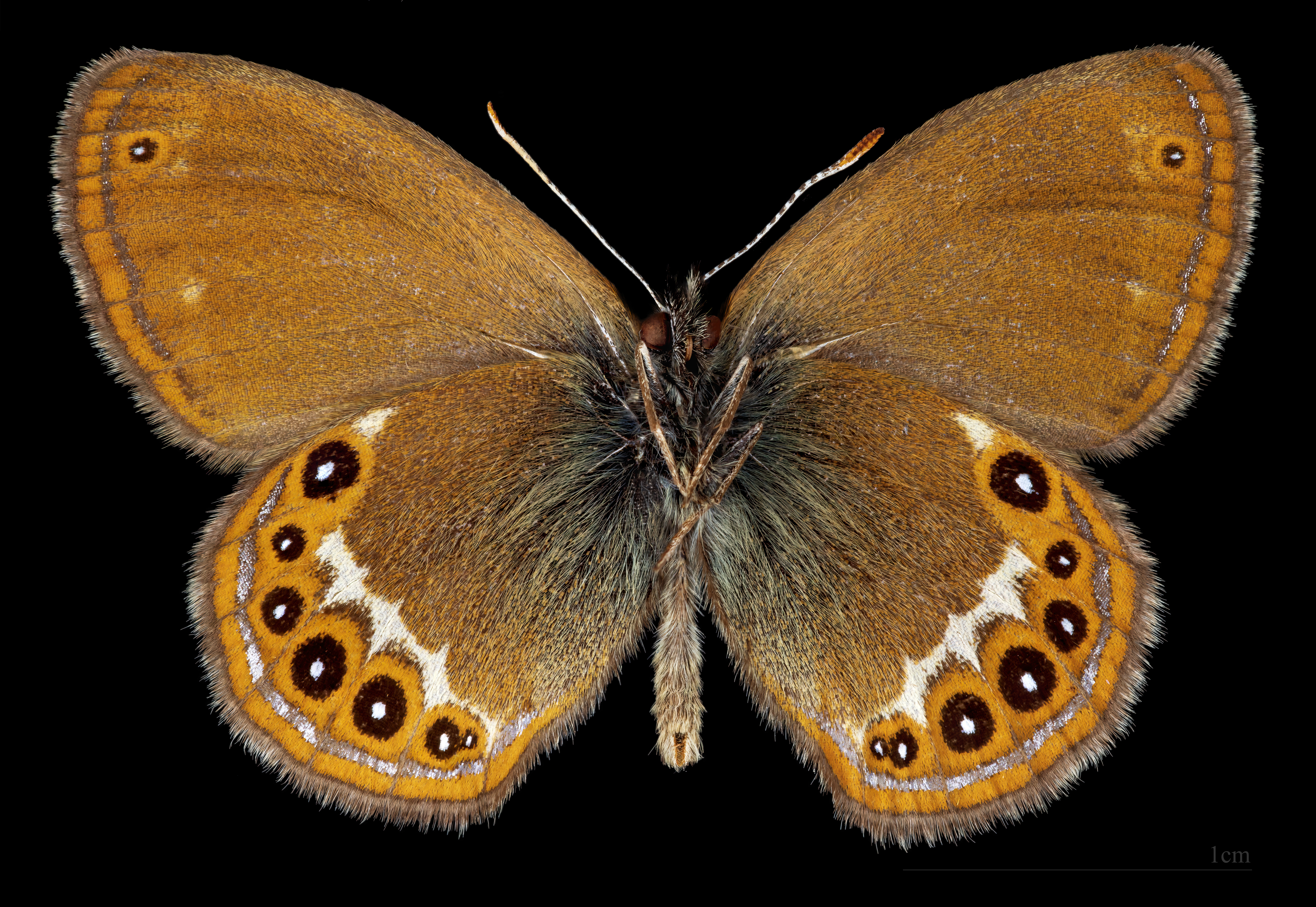
Coenonympha hero ♂△

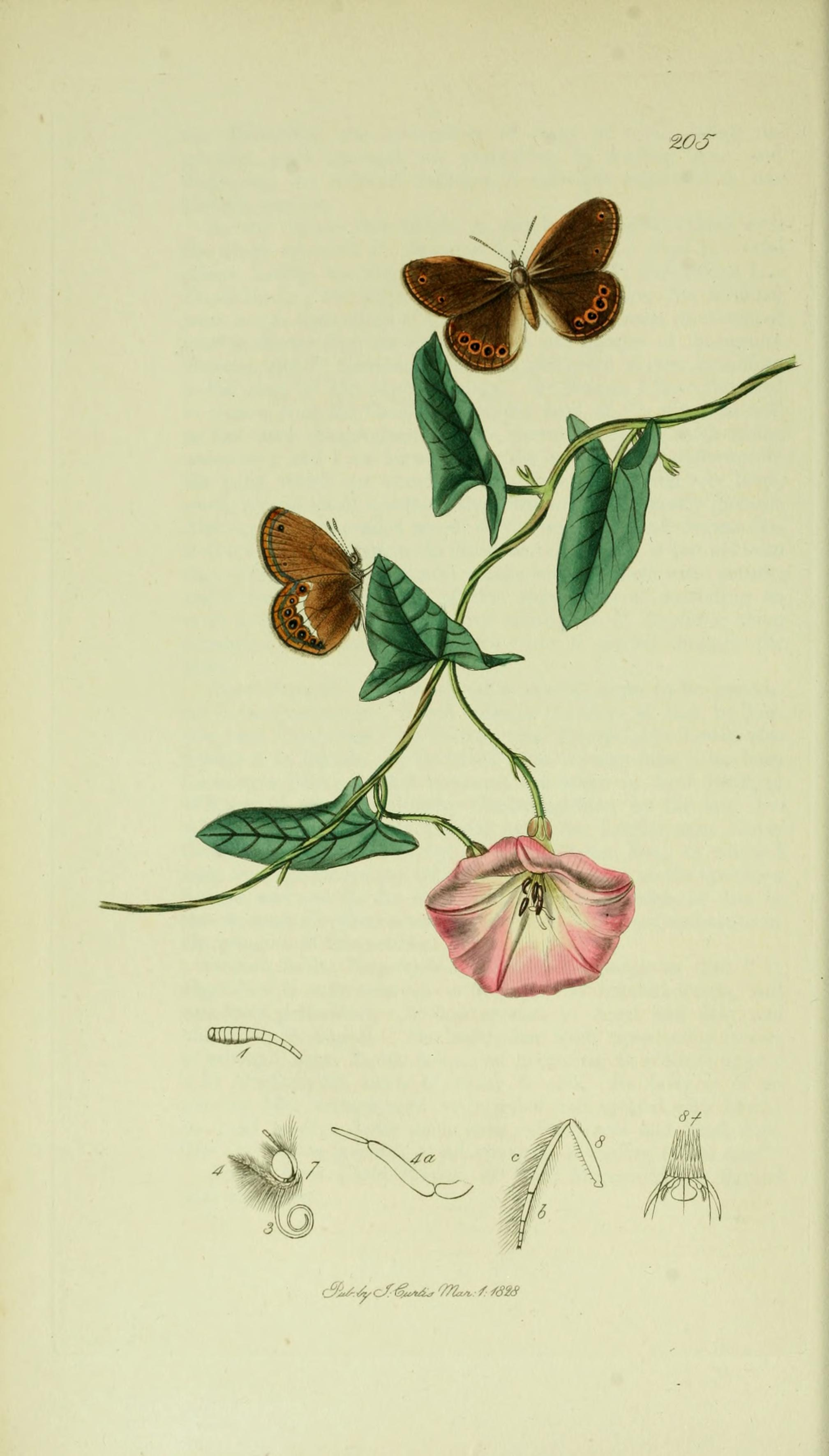
Illustration from John Curtis's British Entomology Volume 5

== Biology ==
The butterflies fly in one generation from May to July.

The larvae feed on various grasses.

== Etymology ==
Named in the Classical tradition.Hero was a Greek scholar.
