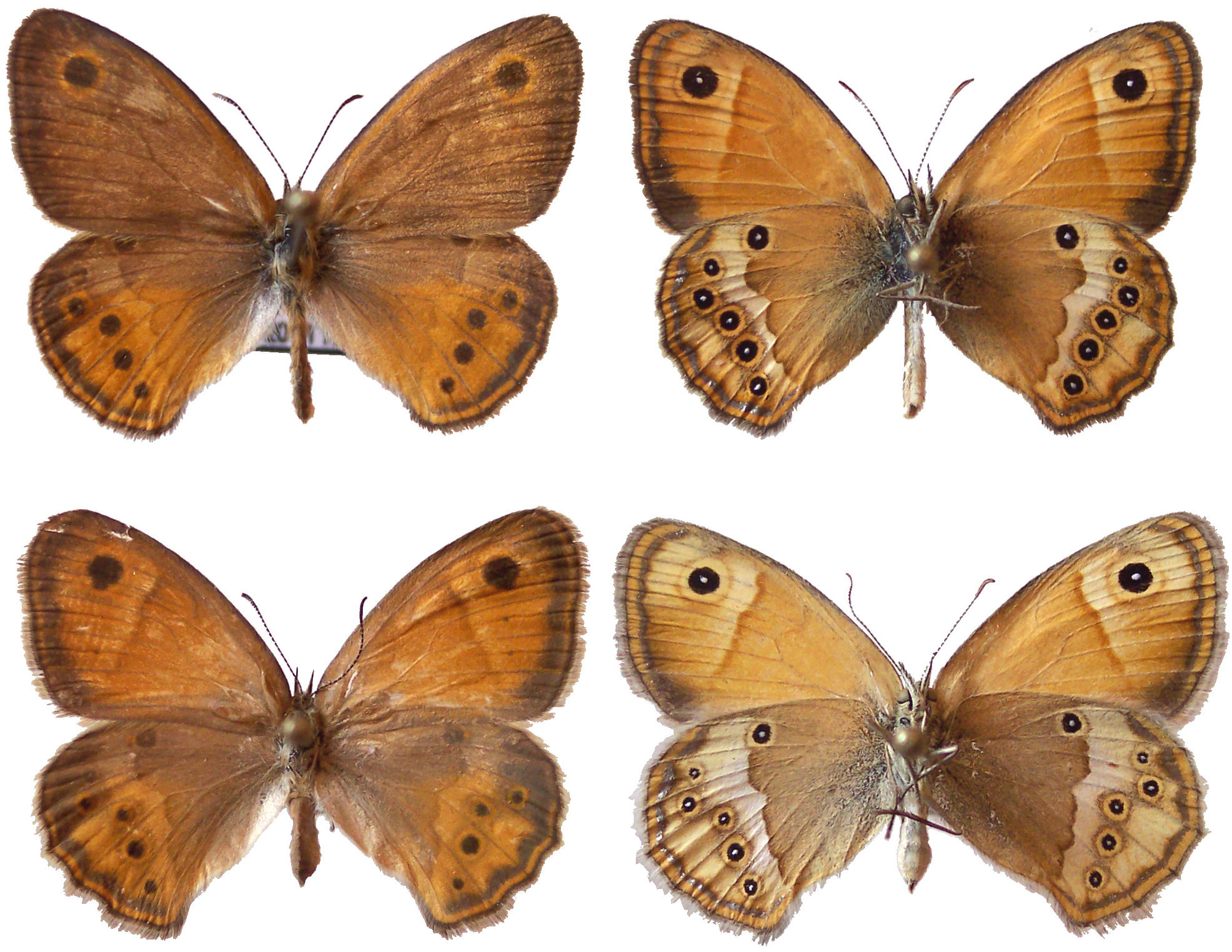
- male and female - Vic-le-Fesq, Gard, France
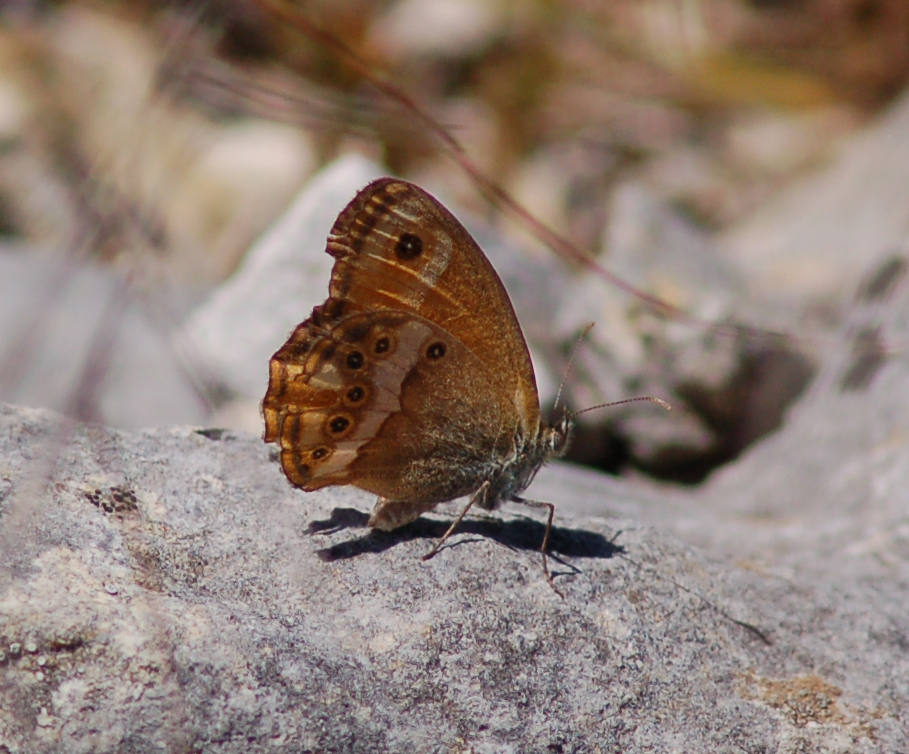

Scientific classification
- Domain: Eukaryota
- Kingdom: Animalia
- Phylum: Arthropoda
- Class: Insecta
- Order: Lepidoptera
- Family: Nymphalidae
- Genus: Coenonympha
- Species: C. dorus

Binomial name
- Coenonympha dorus Esper, 1782

= Coenonympha dorus =

Dusky heath

Species of butterfly

Coenonympha dorus, the dusky heath, is a butterfly of the family Nymphalidae. It is found in south-western Europe and North Africa.

The length of the forewings is 16–17 mm. Seitz C. dorus Esp. (= dorilis Bkh., dorion Hbn.) (48 f). male above entirely shaded with soot-colour, except the posterior portion of the disc of the hindwing; female reddish yellow with a broad black apex and distal margin to both wings. The hindwing above has a curved, proximally convex row of ocelli, which is very irregular on the underside. In South France, Spain and Portugal as well as in Italy, in stony places, not rare, in June and July. — The form austauti Oberth. [ now the subspecies C. d. austauti Oberthür, 1881 ] has ochre-yellow smears on the forewing above, the white band on the underside of the hindwing is much more prominent; from western Algeria. — bieli Stgr., from Portugal, has the hindwing above strongly sooty in both sexes, nearly all the reddish yellow having disappeared from the disc, and the hindwing beneath has the ocelli as well as the metallic line strongly reduced. — andalusica Ribbe has likewise the ocelli on the hindwing beneath strongly reduced, whereas the upperside, especially of the females, is still bright clay-colour; from South Spain. — In ab. caeca Oberth. (48 f) the ocelli are entirely absent from beneath, but the light distal band is present as a unicolorous area; from the Pyrenees. — The ab. fulvia Oberth. (from the Lozère), on the contrary, has the ocelli developed, but there is no light scaling around them, so that they are situated direct in the ground colour. — Nothing is known of the larva of dorus except that it is said (Ruhl) to feed on bent-grass (Agrostis).The butterfly is on the wing from June to August.

The larvae feed on various grasses.
