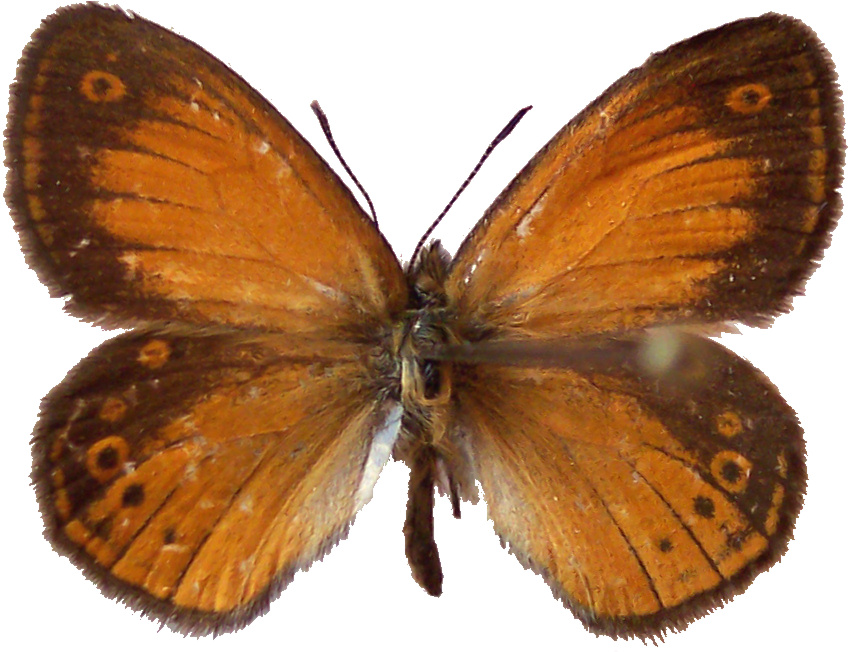
- Caenonympha corinna - Corsica

Scientific classification
- Domain: Eukaryota
- Kingdom: Animalia
- Phylum: Arthropoda
- Class: Insecta
- Order: Lepidoptera
- Family: Nymphalidae
- Genus: Coenonympha
- Species: C. corinna

Binomial name
- Coenonympha corinna (Hübner, 1804)

= Coenonympha corinna =

Corsican heath

Species of butterfly

Coenonympha corinna, the Corsican heath, is a butterfly in the family Nymphalidae

It is found on the Mediterranean islands of Corsica, Sardinia, Elba, and Giannutri.

== Description in Seitz ==
C. corinna Hbn. (= norax Bon.) (48 f). The smallest Coenonympha. Upperside brilliant yellowish red with broad black apex on all the wings; on the forewing the black colour extends as a submarginal stripe as far as the inner angle. On the underside the hindwing is uniformly yellowish red with a small apical ocellus; the hindwing has a darker basal area, and in the lighter marginal portion bears small ocelli of a very diverse development. — elbana Stgr., from the island of Elba, has the apical ocellus of the upperside without pupil and the ocelli of the underside of the hindwing are larger. In Sardinia, Corsica and Sicily, locally very plentiful, in May and June and again from July onward. — Larva light green with a pale-bordered dark dorsal line and a dark shaded yellowish side-line. On Carex gynomane and Triticum cespitosum. Pupa reddish grey with white smears and markings.

The larva feeds on grasses.
