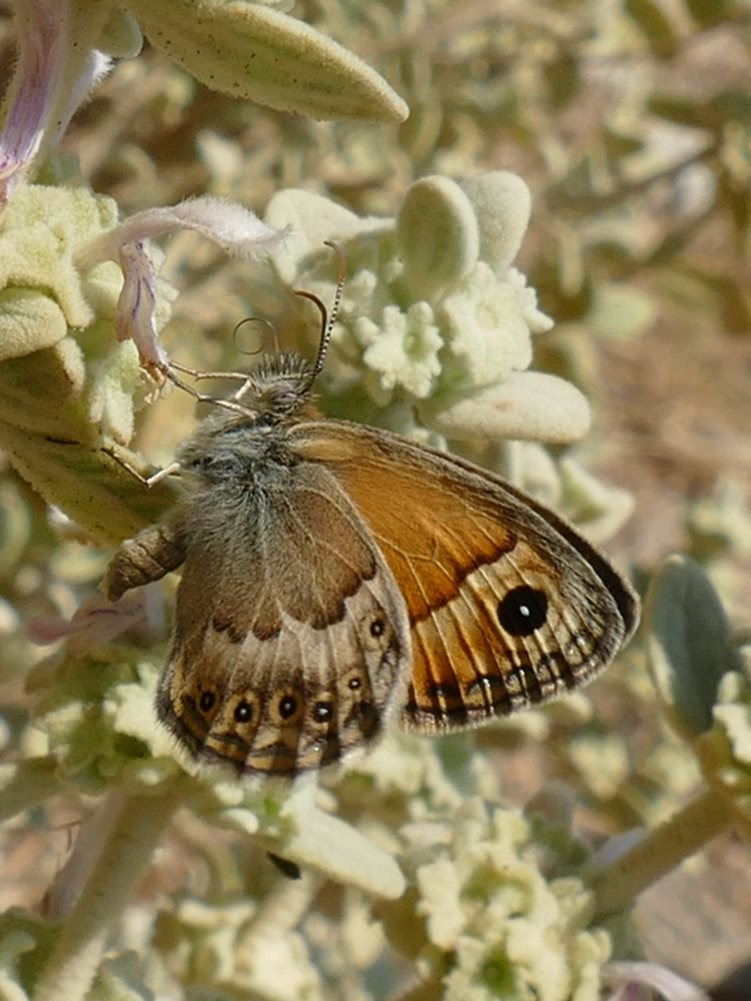

Conservation status
- Least Concern (IUCN 3.1)

Scientific classification
- Kingdom: Animalia
- Phylum: Arthropoda
- Class: Insecta
- Order: Lepidoptera
- Family: Nymphalidae
- Genus: Coenonympha
- Species: C. thyrsis

Binomial name
- Coenonympha thyrsis (Freyer, 1845)

= Coenonympha thyrsis =

Species of butterfly

Coenonympha thyrsis is a small butterfly found in the Palearctic that belongs to the browns family. It is endemic to Crete.

== Description from Seitz ==
C. thyrsis Fn-. (48 e). Nearest to the preceding [C. vaucheri], but the apical ocellus not particularly large; the 5 dots at the distal margin of the hindwing very minute. On the underside much less variegated and contrasting than vaucheri; the apex of the cell not white; the dirty white distal portion of the hindwing reduced to a pale band on account of the distal margin being broadly dark. — In Candia, in May and June.

== See also ==
- List of butterflies of Europe
