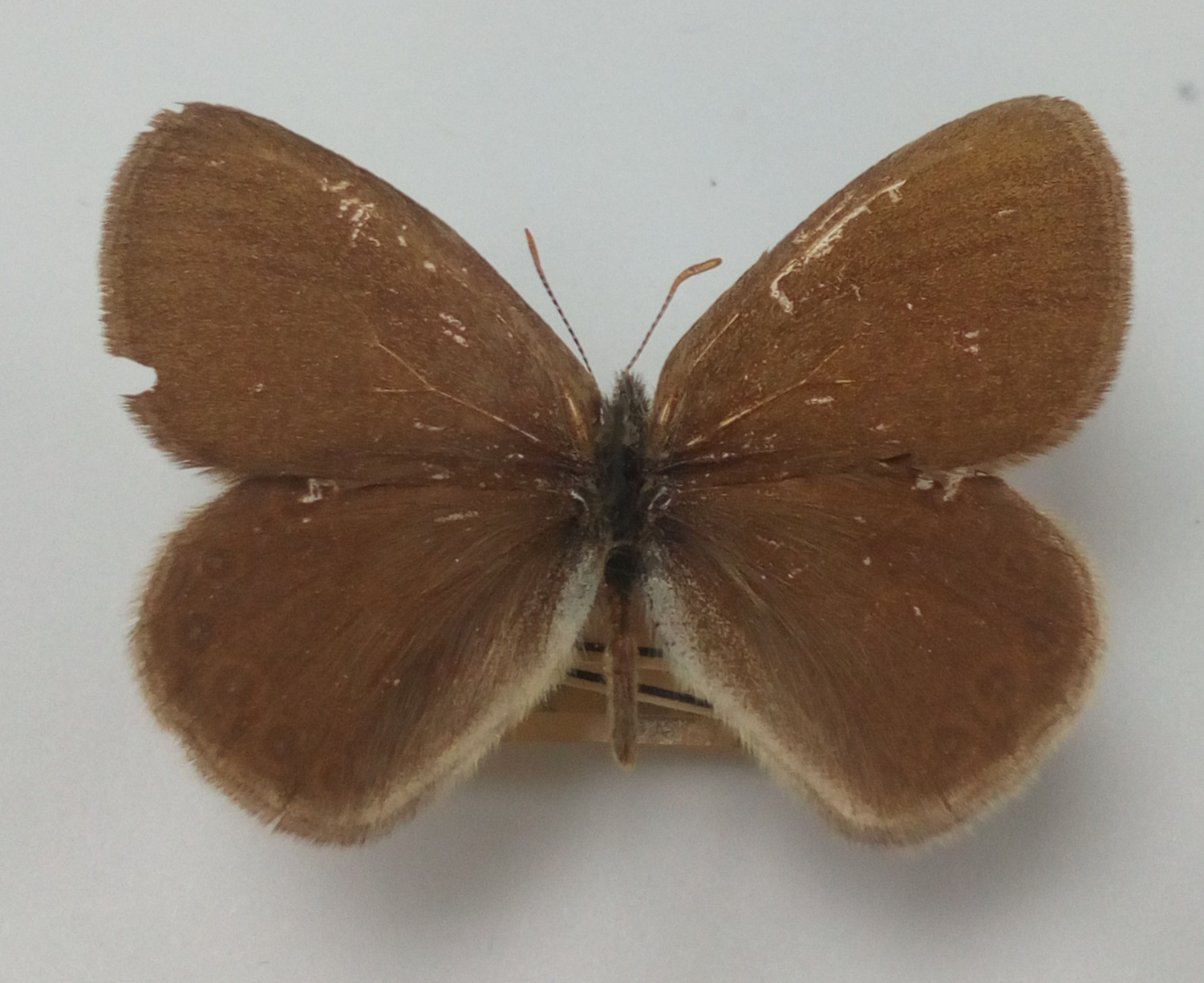

Scientific classification
- Domain: Eukaryota
- Kingdom: Animalia
- Phylum: Arthropoda
- Class: Insecta
- Order: Lepidoptera
- Family: Nymphalidae
- Genus: Coenonympha
- Species: C. haydenii

Binomial name
- Coenonympha haydenii (W. H. Edwards, 1872)

= Coenonympha haydenii =

Species of butterfly

Coenonympha haydenii, or Hayden's ringlet, is a species of brush-footed butterfly in the family Nymphalidae.

The MONA or Hodges number for Coenonympha haydenii is 4581.
