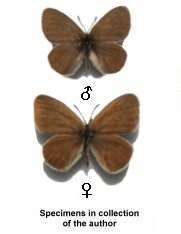

Scientific classification
- Domain: Eukaryota
- Kingdom: Animalia
- Phylum: Arthropoda
- Class: Insecta
- Order: Lepidoptera
- Family: Nymphalidae
- Genus: Coenonympha
- Species: C. mahometana

Binomial name
- Coenonympha mahometana Alphéraky, 1881

= Coenonympha mahometana =

Species of butterfly

Coenonympha mahometana is a species of butterfly in the family Nymphalidae. It is found in parts of the Tian-Shan region, mainly Kyrgyzstan, Kazakhstan, and western China. It can be found in various humid habitats from grassy fields along streams at foothills (1200–1700 m) to humid alpine meadows (3500–3700 m)

== Flight period ==
The species is univoltine and is on wing between June and July, depending on altitude and locality.

== Food plants ==
Larvae feed on grasses.

== Sources ==
- Species info
- BioLib.cz
- Guide to the Butterflies of Russia and Adjacent Territories Volume 1. Pensoft, Sofia - Moscow. 1997.
