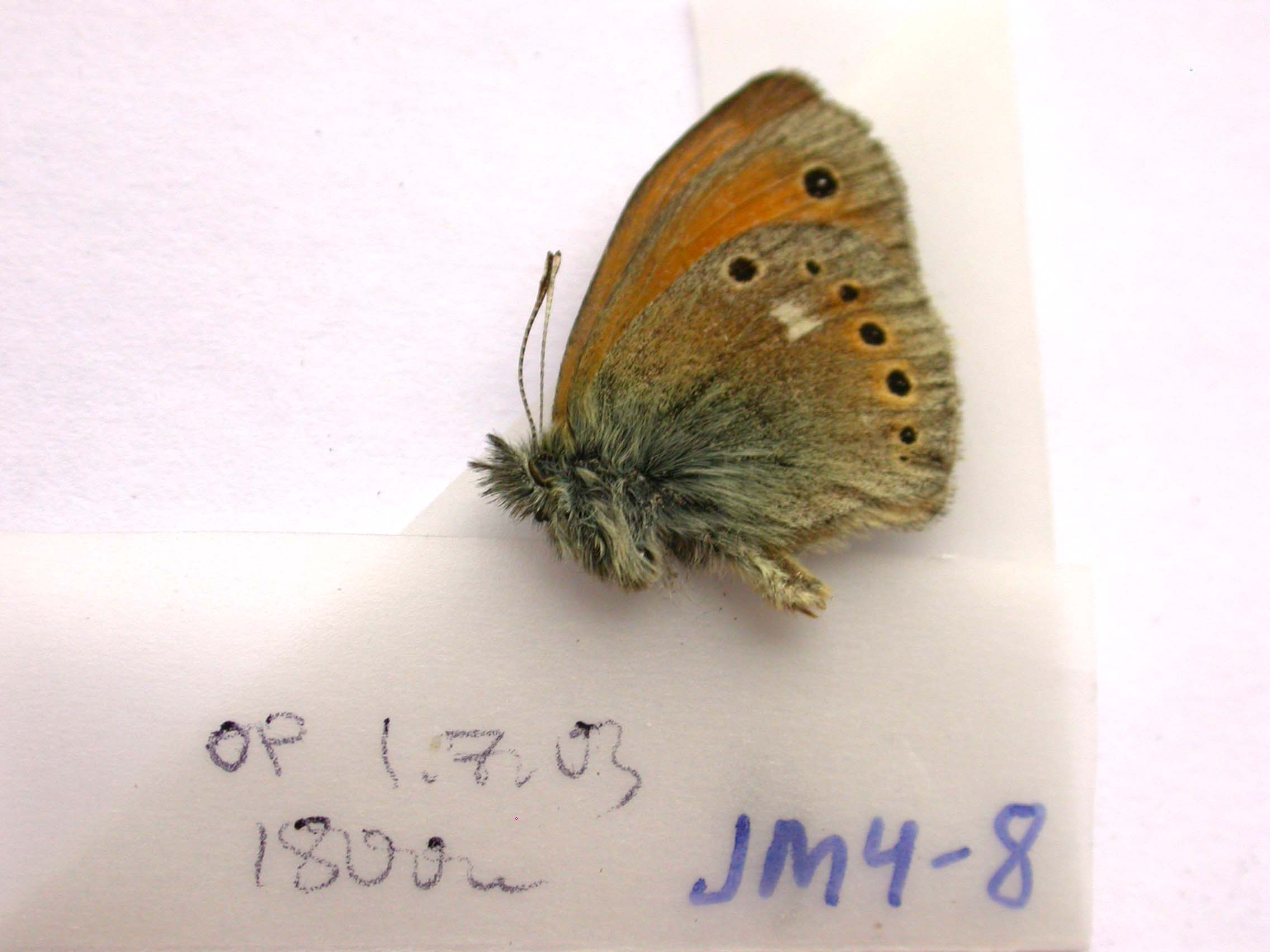

Scientific classification
- Domain: Eukaryota
- Kingdom: Animalia
- Phylum: Arthropoda
- Class: Insecta
- Order: Lepidoptera
- Family: Nymphalidae
- Genus: Coenonympha
- Species: C. rhodopensis

Binomial name
- Coenonympha rhodopensis Elwes, 1900

= Coenonympha rhodopensis =

Eastern large heath

Species of butterfly

Coenonympha rhodopensis (eastern large heath) is a butterfly of the family Nymphalidae. It is found in Italy, Romania, Bulgaria, Albania, northern Greece, Serbia and Montenegro.
