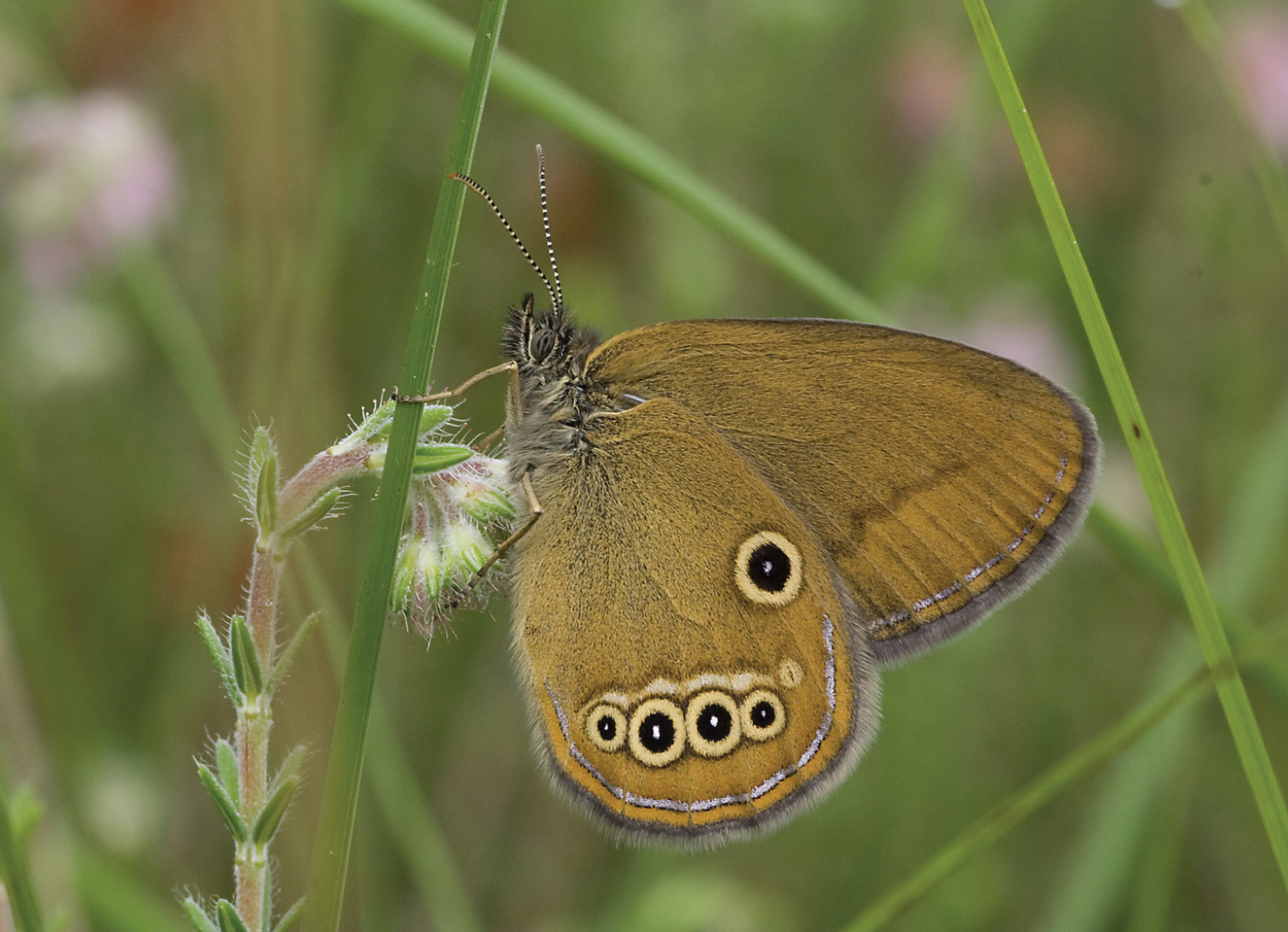

Conservation status
- Near Threatened (IUCN 2.3)

Scientific classification
- Kingdom: Animalia
- Phylum: Arthropoda
- Clade: Pancrustacea
- Class: Insecta
- Order: Lepidoptera
- Family: Nymphalidae
- Genus: Coenonympha
- Species: C. oedippus

Binomial name
- Coenonympha oedippus (Fabricius, 1787)

= Coenonympha oedippus =

False ringlet

Species of butterfly

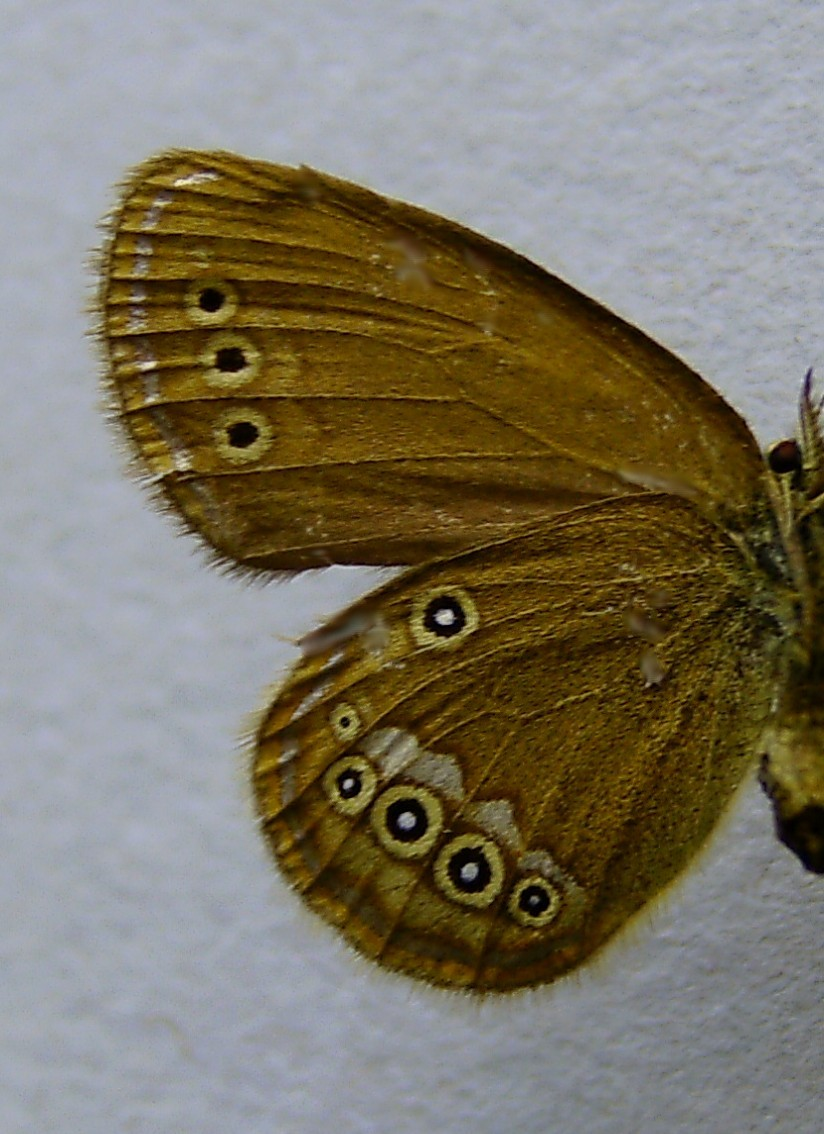
Underside of a female

Coenonympha oedippus, the false ringlet, is a species of butterfly in the subfamily Satyrinae. It is found in Austria, Belgium, the Netherlands, France, Hungary, Italy, Japan, Kazakhstan, Liechtenstein, Mongolia, Poland, Russia, Slovakia, Slovenia, Spain, Switzerland, and Ukraine. It is extirpated from Bulgaria, Germany, and Slovakia.

== Description in Seitz ==
C. oedippus F. (= oedipus O., geticus Esp., pylarge Hbn.) (48 a). Without markings on the upper-side, dark sooty brown. Underside rusty brown washed with yellow; on the hindwing one ocellus before the apex and a straight row of pale-edged ocelli before the distal margin. In Central Europe, very sporadic, in Belgium, France, Northern Italy, Austria, Hungary; in Southern Russia and the Ural Mts. ab. miris F. has on the underside of the forewing an increased number of enlarged ocelli; among the nymotypical form. amurensis Rühl [ Heyne] (48 a) is considerably larger, on the upperside especially dark-coloured, with a very distinct metallic line on the underside; from Eastern Siberia, particularly Amurland. — annulifer Btlr. (48a) is still larger, the ocelli on the underside strongly enlarged, sometimes elongated transversely; Japan. Larva pale green with a dark dorsal line and light lateral stripe; head dark olive-green. From July until May on reeds (said to feed also on Iris). Pupa yellowish green with the capital processes brownish and the wing-cases yellowish with pale borders. The butterflies are on the wing in June and July; they have a hopping flight and are found in damp meadows, especially such as are occasionally flooded. There they prefer stony hillocks. They are generally not numerous in their flight places and the latter are not always accessible because often situated in swamps.

== Subspecies ==
- C. o. oedippus
- C. o. annulifer Butler, 1877 Japan
- C. o. magna Heyne, 1895 Siberia, Altai, Tuva
- C. o. amurensis Heyne, 1895 Primorye Oblast
- C. o. taibaica Murayama
- C. o. magnocellata Krzywicki, 1967

== Status ==
The false ringlet is endangered and is extirpated from some lands.

For more information on status and biology

== Etymology ==
Named in the Classical tradition.Oedipus is a king of Thebes in Greek mythology.
