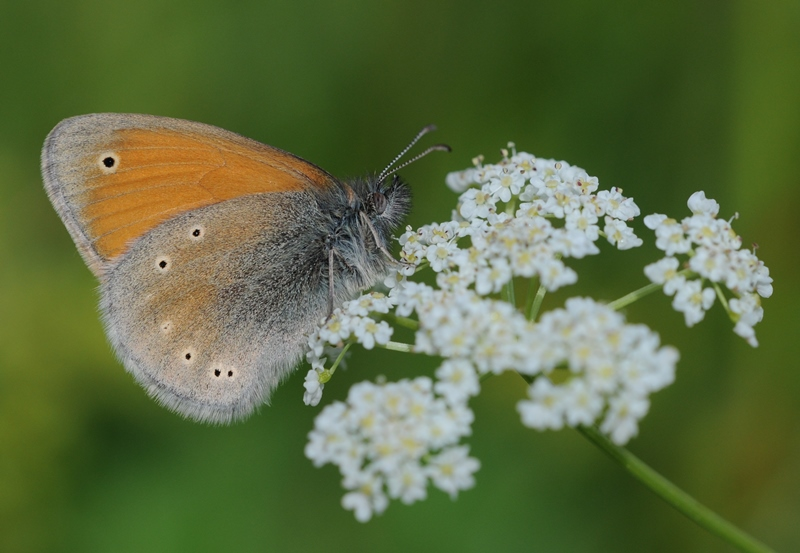

Scientific classification
- Kingdom: Animalia
- Phylum: Arthropoda
- Clade: Pancrustacea
- Class: Insecta
- Order: Lepidoptera
- Family: Nymphalidae
- Genus: Coenonympha
- Species: C. symphita

Binomial name
- Coenonympha symphita Lederer, 1870

Synonyms
- Coenonympha symphita ab. inocellata Sheljuzhko, 1929

= Coenonympha symphita =

Lederer's heath

Species of butterfly

Coenonympha symphita, or Lederer's heath, is a butterfly belonging to the family Nymphalidae. It is found in north-eastern Turkey, south-western Georgia, and north-western Armenia.

The habitat is calcareous grasslands at 2000–2500 m above sea level. Its flight period is from early June to mid-July in one generation per year. The larvae feed on Poa annua.

== Subspecies ==
- Coenonympha symphita symphita Lederer, 1870 (Georgia)
- Coenonympha symphita karsiana Sheljuzhko, 1929 (Transcaucasia)
