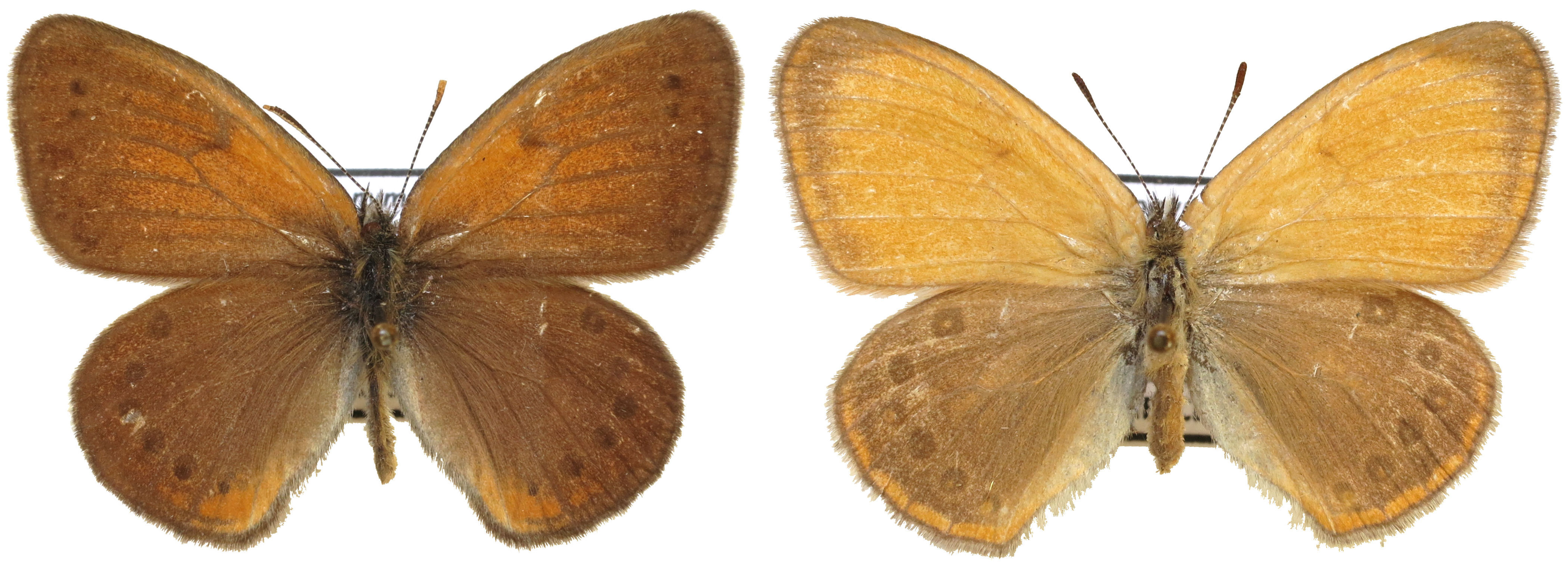
- C. leander pair - Askio, Western Macedonia, Greece
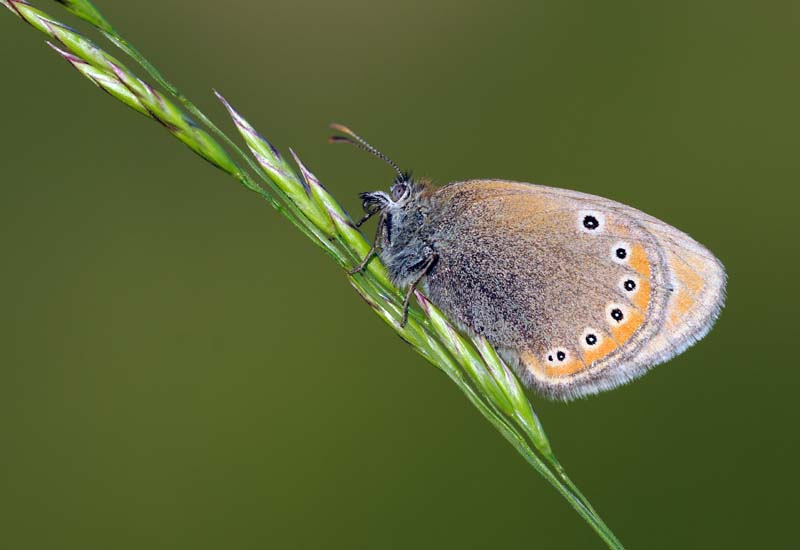

Scientific classification
- Kingdom: Animalia
- Phylum: Arthropoda
- Clade: Pancrustacea
- Class: Insecta
- Order: Lepidoptera
- Family: Nymphalidae
- Genus: Coenonympha
- Species: C. leander

Binomial name
- Coenonympha leander (Esper, 1784)

Synonyms
- Papilio leander Esper, 1784

= Coenonympha leander =

Russian heath

Species of butterfly

Coenonympha leander, the Russian heath, is a butterfly belonging to the family Nymphalidae. It is found in northern Greece, Hungary, Bulgaria, southern Russia, Asia Minor, Armenia and Iran. The habitat consists of warm grassy areas.

The wingspan 32–40 mm.

== Description in Seitz ==
C. leander Esp. (48c). Upperside of the male almost like arcania, forewing yellowish red edged with black;hindwing dark sooty brown, with the ocelli shining through faintly from the underside. Female rather paler, with a narrower margin on the forewing. Underside yellowish brown, hindwing tinged with greyish green, with 6 similar ocelli, the one situated at the anal angle being sometimes double. From Hungary through Bulgaria to the Black Sea, in the Crimea, the Ural and Volga districts, Asia Minor and Persia. — The form obscura Ruhl [Heyne now subspecies](48c) is smaller and washed with a dark colour, so that the upperside appears uniformly sooty brown; from Armenia. — iphioides Stgr. (48 c)[now species Coenonympha iphioides Staudinger, 1870], from Castilia, is on the upperside similar to iphis, but the ocelli on the underside of the hindwing are very large and complete, touching one another with their outer borders. The thinly black edge of the wing on the underside, which bears the pale fringes, contrasts strongly with a pale ochre-yellow marginal band, which is limited proximally by the metallic line. Caught near San Ildefonso. — In May and June. Adults are on wing from May to August in one generation per year.

The larvae feed on Poa, Melica, Anthoxanthum and Lolium species.

== Subspecies ==
- Coenonympha leander leander
- Coenonympha leander obscura Heyne, 1894 (Caucasus Minor, Armenian Highland, Talysh)
