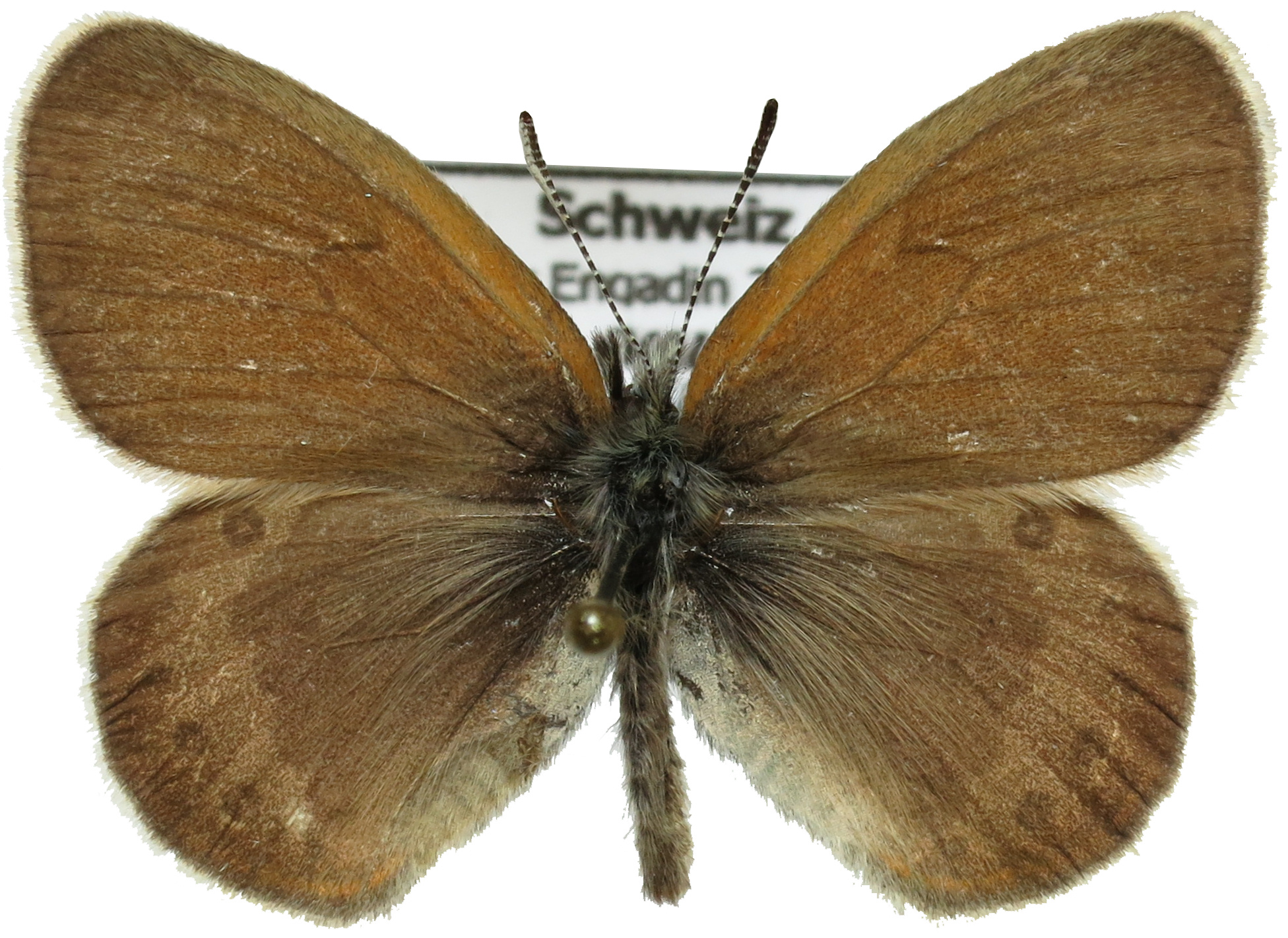
- Male, Val da Fain, Switzerland
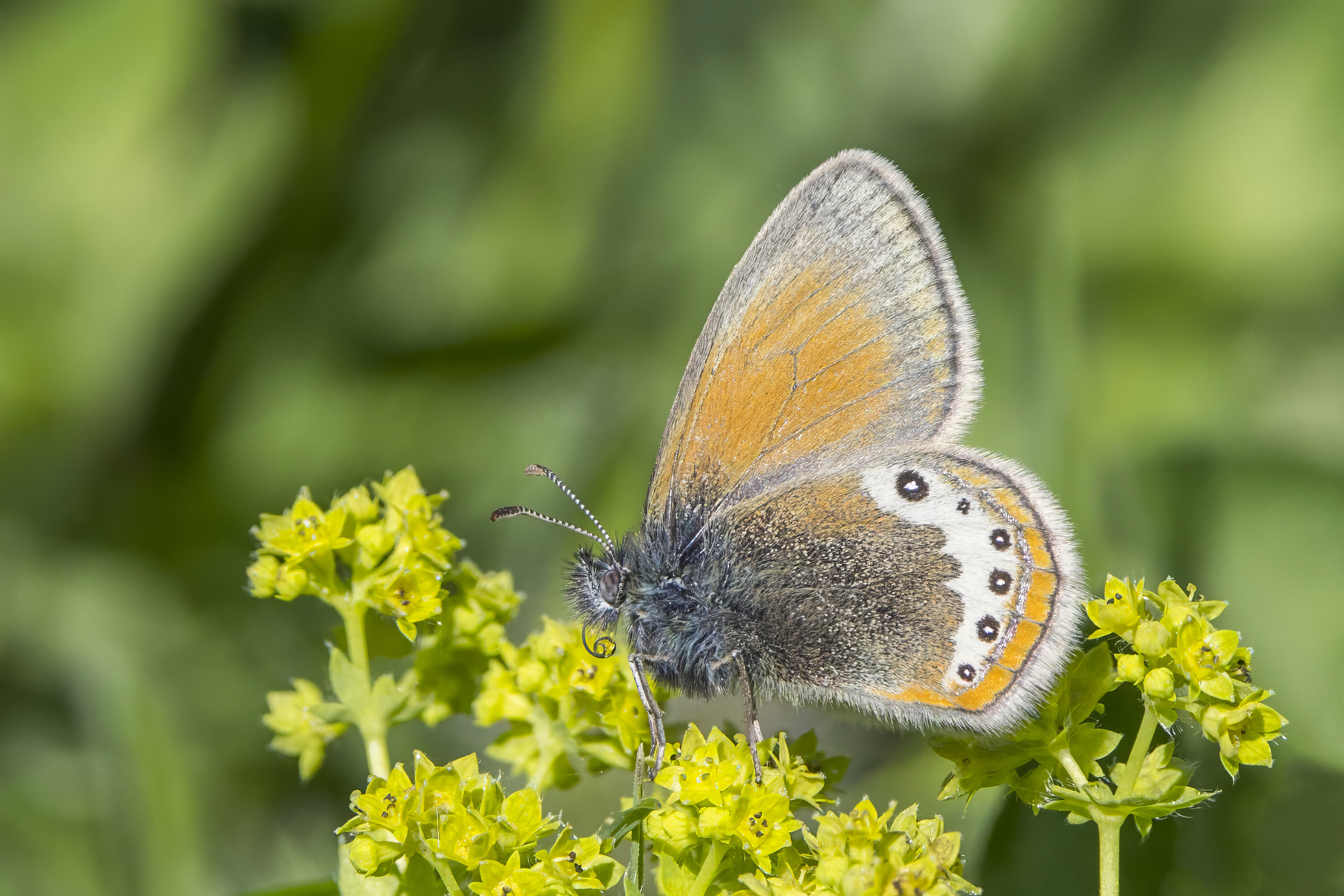
- Male, Wengen, Switzerland

Scientific classification
- Kingdom: Animalia
- Phylum: Arthropoda
- Clade: Pancrustacea
- Class: Insecta
- Order: Lepidoptera
- Family: Nymphalidae
- Genus: Coenonympha
- Species: C. gardetta

Binomial name
- Coenonympha gardetta (de Prunner, 1798)

Synonyms
- Papilio satyrion Esper, 1805; Papilio philea (Hübner, 1800); Papilio neoclides (Hübner, 1805)

= Coenonympha gardetta =

Species of butterfly

Coenonympha gardetta, the Alpine heath, is a butterfly species belonging to the family Nymphalidae. It can be in alpine meadows on heights of 800 to 2,900 from the Massif Central to Albania.

The length of the forewings is 15–16 mm. Seitz treated it as a subspecies of C. arcania -satyrion Esp. (48 d); a mountain form from the Carpathian Mts., which differs greatly from the nymotype: on the upperside the male is mouse-grey and the female brownish-grey, almost unicolorous; on the underside the white distal band is of even width and bears the very regular row of distinct ocelli exactly in its centre; from about 4000–7000 feet.

Adults are on wing from June to September. There is one generation per year.

The larvae feed on various grasses.
