= List of butterflies of Morocco =

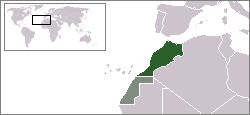
Location of Morocco (dark green) and the Western Sahara, partially controlled by disputed Sahrawi Arab Democratic Republic (light green)

This is a simple list of the butterflies of Morocco. It does not include the rank changes or subspecies recognized by Tennent (1996) or Delacre and Tarrier (2008).

The list includes the Spanish controlled areas of Ceuta, Melilla and Plazas de soberanía, as well as the territory of the disputed state Sahrawi Arab Democratic Republic.

== Hesperiidae ==
- Large grizzled skipper, Pyrgus alveus (Hübner, 1803)
- Oberthür's grizzled skipper, Pyrgus armoricanus (Oberthür, 1910)
- Rosy grizzled skipper, Pyrgus onopordi Rambur, 1839
- Red-underwing skipper, Spialia sertorius Hoffmannsegg, 1804
- Desert grizzled skipper, Spialia doris (Walker, 1870)
- Sage skipper, Muschampia proto Ochsenheimer, 1808
- Barbary skipper, Syrichtus mohammed Oberthür, 1887
- Syrichtus leuzae Oberthür, 1881
- False mallow skipper, Carcharodus tripolina Verity, 1925
- Marbled skipper, Carcharodus lavatherae Esper, 1783
- Carcharodus floccifera (Zeller, 1847).
- Stauder's skipper, Carcharodus stauderi Reverdin, 1913
- Tufted skipper, Thymelicus acteon (Rottemburg, 1775)
- Moroccan small skipper, Thymelicus hamza Oberthür 1876
- Essex skipper, Thymelicus lineola (Ochsenheimer, 1808)
- Small skipper, Thymelicus sylvestris (Poda, 1761)
- Silver-spotted skipper, Hesperia comma (Linnaeus, 1758)
- Mediterranean skipper, Gegenes nostrodamus Fabricius, 1794
- Pigmy skipper, Gegenes pumilio Hoffmannsegg, 1804
- Zeller's skipper, Borbo borbonica Boisduval, 1833

== Papilionidae ==
=== Papilioninae ===
- Spanish festoon, Zerynthia rumina (Linnaeus, 1758)
- Scarce swallowtail, Iphiclides feisthamelii (Duponchel, 1832)
- Old World swallowtail, Papilio machaon Linnaeus, 1758
- Sahara swallowtail, Papilio saharae Oberthür, 1879

== Pieridae ==
=== Pierinae ===
- Black-veined white, Aporia crataegi (Linnaeus 1758)
- Large white, Pieris brassicae (Linnaeus, 1758)
- Small white, Pieris rapae (Linnaeus, 1758)
- Southern small white, Pieris mannii (Mayer, 1851)
- Green-veined white, Pieris napi (Linnaeus, 1758)
- Bath white, Pontia daplidice (Linnaeus, 1908)
- Desert white, Pontia glauconome (Klug, 1829)
- Eastern dappled white, Euchloe ausonia (Hübner, [1803-1804])
- Portuguese dappled white, Euchloe tagis (Hübner, [1803-1804])
- Green-striped white, Euchloe belemia (Esper, 1800)
- Scarce green striped white, Euchloe falloui (Allard, 1867)
- Greenish black-tip, Euchloe charlonia (Donzel, 1842)
- Sooty orange tip, Zegris eupheme Esper, 1805
- Morocco orange tip, Anthocharis belia (Linnaeus, 1767)
- Colotis evagore Klug, 1829
- Golden Arab, Colotis chrysonome (Klug, 1829)

=== Coliadinae ===
- African migrant, Catopsilia florella (Fabricius, 1775)
- Dark clouded yellow, Colias croceus (Geoffroy in Fourcroy, 1785)
- Berger's clouded yellow, Colias alfacariensis Ribbe, 1905
- Common brimstone, Gonepteryx rhamni (Linnaeus, 1758)
- Cleopatra, Gonepteryx cleopatra (Linnaeus, 1767)

=== Dismorphiinae ===
- Wood white, Leptidea sinapis (Linnaeus, 1758)

== Lycaenidae ==
=== Theclinae ===
- Donzel's silver-line, Cigaritis zohra Donzel, 1847
- Allard's silver lines, Cigaritis allardi Oberthür 1909
- Purple hairstreak, Neozephyrus quercus (Linnaeus 1758)
- False ilex hairstreak, Satyrium esculi (Hübner, 1804)
- Green hairstreak, Callophrys rubi (Linnaeus, 1758)
- Chapman's green hairstreak, Callophrys avis Chapman, 1909
- Provence hairstreak, Tomares ballus (Fabricius, 1787)
- Moroccan hairstreak, Tomares mauretanicus (Lucas, 1849)

=== Lycaeninae ===
- Small copper, Lycaena phlaeas (Linnaeus, 1761)
- Purple-shot copper, Lycaena alciphron (Rottemburg, 1775)
- Lycaena phoebus (Blachier, 1905)

=== Polyommatinae ===
- Long-tailed blue, Lampides boeticus (Linnaeus, 1767)
- Common zebra blue, Leptotes pirithous (Linnaeus, 1767)
- Geranium bronze, Cacyreus marshalli Butler, 1898
- Pointed Pierrot, Tarucus theophrastus (Fabricius, 1793)
- Tarucus rosacea (Austaut, 1885)
- African babul blue, Azanus jesous (Guérin-Méneville, 1849)
- Bright babul blue, Azanus ubaldus (Stoll, 1782)
- African grass blue, Zizeeria knysna (Trimen, 1862)
- Lorquin's blue, Cupido lorquinii (Herrich-Schäffer, 1851)
- Holly blue, Celastrina argiolus (Linnaeus, 1758)
- Black-eyed blue, Glaucopsyche melanops (Boisduval, 1828).
- Iolas blue, Iolana iolas (Ochsenheimer, 1816)
- False baton blue, Pseudophilotes abencerragus (Pierret, 1837)
- Panoptes blue, Pseudophilotes panoptes (Hübner, [1813])
- Bavius blue, Pseudophilotes bavius (Eversmann, 1832)
- Brown argus, Aricia agestis (Denis & Schiffermüller, 1775)
- Northern brown argus, Aricia artaxerxes (Fabricius, 1775)
- Vogel's blue, Maurus vogelii (Oberthür, 1920)
- Kretania allardii (Oberthür, 1874)
- Martin's blue, Kretania martini (Allard, 1867)
- Mazarine blue, Cyaniris semiargus (Rottemburg, 1775).
- Common blue, Polyommatus icarus (Rottemburg, 1775)
- Escher's blue, Polyommatus escheri Hübner, 1823
- Amanda's blue, Polyommatus amanda Schneider, 1792
- Chapman's blue, Polyommatus thersites (Cantener, 1835)
- Atlas blue, Polyommatus atlantica (Elwes, 1905)
- Spanish chalk-hill blue, Lysandra albicans (Gerhard, 1851)
- Chalkhill blue, Lysandra coridon (Poda, 1761)
- Spotted Adonis blue, Lysandra punctifera (Oberthür, 1876)
- Adonis blue, Lysandra bellargus (Rottemburg, 1775)

== Nymphalidae ==
=== Danainae ===
- Monarch, Danaus plexippus (Linnaeus, 1758)
- Danaus chrysippus (Linnaeus, 1758)

=== Charaxinae ===
- Two-tailed pasha, Charaxes jasius (Linnaeus, 1767)

=== Nymphalinae ===
- Blackleg tortoiseshell, Nymphalis polychloros (Linnaeus, 1758)
- Red admiral, Vanessa atalanta (Linnaeus, 1758)
- Painted lady, Vanessa cardui (Linnaeus, 1758)
- Comma, Polygonia c-album (Linnaeus, 1758)
- Glanville fritillary, Melitaea cinxia (Linnaeus, 1758)
- Knapweed fritillary, Melitaea phoebe (Denis & Schiffermüller, 1775)
- Aetherie fritillary, Melitaea aetherie (Hübner, 1826)
- Spotted fritillary, Melitaea didyma (Esper, 1778)
- Desert fritillary, Melitaea deserticola (Oberthür, 1876)
- Provençal fritillary, Melitaea deione (Geyer, 1832)
- Marsh fritillary, Euphydryas aurinia (Rottemburg, 1775)
- Spanish fritillary, Euphydryas desfontainii (Godart, 1819)

=== Heliconiinae ===
- Cardinal, Argynnis pandora (Denis & Schiffermüller, 1775)
- Dark green fritillary, Speyeria aglaja (Linnaeus, 1758)
- Moroccan high brown fritillary, Fabriciana auresiana (Fruhstorfer, 1908)
- Queen of Spain fritillary, Issoria lathonia (Linnaeus, 1758)
- Violet fritillary, Boloria dia (Linnaeus, 1767)

=== Satyrinae ===
- Western marbled white, Melanargia occitanica Esper, 1793
- Spanish marbled white, Melanargia ines (Hoffmannsegg, 1804)
- Tree grayling, Hipparchia statilinus Hufnagel, 1766
- Austaut's grayling, Hipparchia hansii (Austaut, 1879)
- Powell's grayling, Hipparchia powelli (Oberthür, 1910)
- Striped grayling, Hipparchia fidia Linnaeus, 1767
- Hermit, Chazara briseis Linnaeus, 1764
- Southern hermit, Chazara prieuri (Pierret, 1837)
- Moroccan grayling, Pseudochazara atlantis (Austaut, 1905)
- Great sooty satyr, Satyrus ferula (Fabricius, 1793)
- Giant grayling, Berberia abdelkader (Pierret, 1837)
- dark giant grayling, Berberia lambessanus (Staudinger, 1901)
- Meadow brown, Maniola jurtina (Linnaeus, 1758)
- Moroccan meadow brown, Hyponephele maroccana (Blachier, 1908)
- Oriental meadow brown, Hyponephele lupinus (Costa, 1836)
- Gatekeeper, Pyronia tithonus (Linnaeus, 1758)
- Southern gatekeeper, Pyronia cecilia (Vallantin, 1894)
- Spanish gatekeeper, Pyronia bathseba (Fabricius, 1793)
- Coenonympha lyllus (Esper, 1806)
- Dusky heath, Coenonympha dorus Esper, 1782
- Moroccan dusky heath, Coenonympha fettigii Oberthür, 1874
- Coenonympha vaucheri Blachier 1905
- Moroccan pearly heath, Coenonympha arcanioides (Pierret, 1837)
- Speckled wood, Pararge aegeria (Linnaeus, 1758)
- Wall brown, Lasiommata megera (Linnaeus, 1767)
- Large wall brown, Lasiommata maera (Linnaeus, 1758)

== See also ==
- List of ecoregions in Morocco
