= List of butterflies of Algeria =

Location of Algeria

This is a list of butterflies of Algeria. About 121 species are known from Algeria.

== Hesperiidae ==
- Borbo borbonica
- Carcharodus tripolina
- Carcharodus lavatherae
- Carcharodus stauderi
- Gegenes pumilio
- Gegenes nostrodamus
- Hesperia comma
- Muschampia proto
- Muschampia mohammed
- Muschampia leuzeae
- Pyrgus onopordi
- Pyrgus armoricanus
- Pyrgus alveus
- Spialia sertorius
- Thymelicus lineola
- Thymelicus sylvestris
- Thymelicus acteon
- Thymelicus hamza

== Papilionidae ==
- Iphiclides podalirius
- Papilio machaon
- Papilio saharae
- Zerynthia rumina

== Pieridae ==
- Anaphaeis aurota
- Anthocharis euphenoides
- Aporia crataegi
- Catopsilia florella
- Colias croceus
- Colotis evagore
- Colotis liagore
- Colotis phisadia
- Colotis chrysonome
- Euchloe belemia
- Euchloe ausonia
- Euchloe tagis
- Euchloe falloui
- Euchloe charlonia
- Gonepteryx rhamni
- Gonepteryx cleopatra
- Pieris brassicae
- Pieris rapae
- Pieris napi
- Pontia daplidice
- Pontia glauconome

== Lycaenidae ==
- Aricia cramera
- Azanus ubaldus
- Callophrys rubi
- Callophrys avis
- Celastrina argiolus
- Cigaritis allardi
- Cigaritis siphax
- Cigaritis zohra
- Cigaritis acamas
- Cigaritis myrmecophilia
- Cupido lorquinii
- Glaucopsyche alexis
- Glaucopsyche melanops
- Kretania allardii
- Kretania martini
- Lampides boeticus
- Leptotes pirithous
- Lycaena phlaeas
- Lysandra punctifera
- Neozephyrus quercus
- Polyommatus atlantica
- Polyommatus amandus
- Polyommatus icarus
- Pseudophilotes abencerragus
- Pseudophilotes bavius
- Satyrium esculi
- Tarucus theophrastus
- Tarucus rosacea
- Tarucus balkanica
- Tomares ballus
- Tomares mauretanicus
- Virachola livia
- Zizeeria knysna
- Zizeeria karsandra
- Zizina antanossa

== Nymphalidae ==
- Argynnis paphia
- Argynnis pandora
- Berberia abdelkader
- Berberia lambessanus
- Charaxes jasius
- Chazara briseis
- Chazara prieuri
- Coenonympha fettigii
- Coenonympha arcanioides
- Coenonympha dorus
- Coenonympha pamphilus
- Danaus chrysippus
- Euphydryas desfontainii
- Euphydryas aurinia
- Fabriciana auresiana
- Hipparchia ellena
- Hipparchia aristaeus
- Hipparchia statilinus
- Hipparchia hansii
- Hipparchia powelli
- Hipparchia fidia
- Hyponephele lupinus
- Issoria lathonia
- Lasiommata megera
- Lasiommata maera
- Libythea celtis
- Maniola jurtina
- Melanargia galathea
- Melanargia occitanica
- Melanargia ines
- Melitaea cinxia
- Melitaea phoebe
- Melitaea aetherie
- Melitaea didyma
- Melitaea deserticola
- Melitaea deione
- Pararge aegeria
- Polygonia c-album
- Pyronia cecilia
- Pyronia bathseba
- Pyronia janiroides
- Vanessa atalanta
- Vanessa cardui
