= List of butterflies of Europe (Hesperiidae) =

This is a list of the butterflies of family Hesperiidae, or the "skippers", which are found in Europe. It is a part of the list of the butterflies of Europe.

== Subfamily Hesperiinae ==
- Zeller's skipper, Borbo borbonica (Boisduval, 1833)
- Mediterranean skipper, Gegenes nostrodamus (Fabricius, 1793)
- Pigmy skipper, Gegenes pumilio (Hoffmansegg, 1804)
- Silver-spotted skipper, Hesperia comma ( Linnaeus, 1758)
- Large skipper, Ochlodes sylvanus ( Esper, 1777)
- White branded swift, Pelopidas thrax (Hübner, 1821)
- Lulworth skipper, Thymelicus acteon (Rottemburg, 1775)
- Thymelicus christi Rebel, 1894 uncertain taxonomic status
- Levantine skipper, Thymelicus hyrax (Lederer, 1861)
- Essex skipper, Thymelicus lineola (Ochsenheimer, 1808)
- Small skipper, Thymelicus sylvestris (Poda, 1761)

== Subfamily Heteropterinae ==
- Chequered skipper, Carterocephalus palaemon (Pallas, 1771)
- Northern chequered skipper, Carterocephalus silvicola Meigen, 1829
- Large chequered skipper, Heteropterus morpheus (Pallas, 1771)

== Subfamily Pyrginae ==
- Mallow skipper, Carcharodus alceae (Esper, 1780)
- Southern marbled skipper, Carcharodus baeticus (Rambur, 1839)
- Tufted skipper, Carcharodus floccifera (Zeller, 1847)
- Marbled skipper, Carcharodus lavatherae (Esper, 1783)
- Oriental skipper, Carcharodus orientalis Reverdin, 1913
- Stauder's skipper, Carcharodus stauderi Reverdin, 1913
- False mallow skipper, Carcharodus tripolina (Vérity, 1925)
- Inky skipper, Erynnis marloyi (Boisduval, 1834)
- Dingy skipper, Erynnis tages (Linnaeus, 1758)
- Spinose skipper, Muschampia cribrellum (Eversmann, 1841)
- Sage skipper, Muschampia proto (Ochsenheimer, 1808)
- Tessellated skipper, Muschampia tessellum (Hübner, 1803)
- Large grizzled skipper, Pyrgus alveus (Hübner, 1803)
- Alpine grizzled skipper, Pyrgus andromedae (Wallengren, 1853)
- Oberthür's grizzled skipper, Pyrgus armoricanus (Oberthür, 1910)
- Foulquier's grizzled skipper, Pyrgus bellieri (Oberthür, 1910)
- Dusky grizzled skipper, Pyrgus cacaliae (Rambur, 1839)
- Carline skipper, Pyrgus carlinae (Rambur, 1839)
- Safflower skipper, Pyrgus carthami (Hübner, 1813)
- Alpine checkered skipper, Pyrgus centaureae (Rambur, 1839)
- Sandy grizzled skipper, Pyrgus cinarae (Rambur, 1839)
- Cinquefoil skipper, Pyrgus cirsii (Rambur, 1839)
- Grizzled skipper, Pyrgus malvae (Linnaeus, 1758)
- Southern grizzled skipper, Pyrgus malvoides (Elwes & Edwards, 1897)
- Rosy grizzled skipper, Pyrgus onopordi (Rambur, 1839)
- Olive skipper, Pyrgus serratulae (Rambur, 1839)
- Yellow-banded skipper, Pyrgus sidae (Esper, 1784)
- Warren's skipper, Pyrgus warrenensis (Vérity, 1928)
- Hungarian skipper, Spialia orbifer (Hübner, 1823)
- Persian skipper, Spialia phlomidis (Herrich-Schäffer, 1845)
- Spialia rosae Hernández-Roldán, Dapporto, Dinca, Vicente & Vila, 2016
- Red underwing skipper, Spialia sertorius (Hoffmansegg, 1804)
- Spialia therapne (Rambur, 1832)
