= List of butterflies of Turkey =

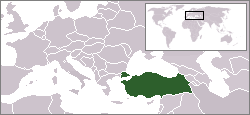
Location of Turkey

This is a list of butterflies of Turkey. At least 400 true species are known from Turkey but there are certainly more. The names in italics following the dash are the common names in Turkish.

== Papilionidae ==
- Allancastria cerisyi (Godart, 1824) – ormanfistosu
- Allancastria caucasica (Lederer, 1864) – Kafkas fistosu
- Allancastria deyrollei (Oberthür, 1869) – stepfistosu
- Archon apollinaris (Staudinger, [1892]) – küçük yalancıapollo
- Archon apollinus (Herbst, 1789) – yalancı Apollo
- Iphiclides podalirius (Linnaeus, 1758) – erik kırlangıçkuyruk
- Papilio alexanor (Esper, 1800) – kaplan kırlangıçkuyruk
- Papilio demoleus (Linnaeus, 1758) – Nusaybin güzeli
- Papilio machaon (Linnaeus, 1758) – kırlangıçkuyruk
- Parnassius apollo (Linnaeus, 1758) – Apollo
- Parnassius mnemosyne (Linnaeus, 1758) – dumanlı Apollo
- Parnassius nordmanni (Ménétriés, [1850]) – Kafkas Apollosu
- Zerynthia polyxena (Denis & Schiffermüller, 1775) – Güneyfistosu

== Pieridae ==
- Anthocharis cardamines (Linnaeus, 1758) – turuncusüslü
- Anthocharis damone (Boisduval, 1836) – süslüdamone
- Anthocharis gruneri (Herrich-Schäffer, [1851]) – stepsüslüsü
- Aporia crataegi (Linnaeus, 1758) – alıçbeyazı
- Belenois aurota (Fabricius, 1793) – beyazöncü
- Catopsilia florella (Fabricius, 1775) – Afrikagöçmeni
- Colias aurorina (Herrich-Schäffer, 1850) – Anadolu azameti
- Colias caucasica (Staudinger, 1871) – Kafkas azameti
- Colias chlorocoma (Christoph, 1888) – Azeri azameti
- Colias croceus (Geoffroy, 1785) – sarı azamet
- Colias erate (Esper, 1805) – doğu azameti
- Colias hyale (Linnaeus, 1758) – orman azameti
- Colias alfacariensis Ribbe, 1905 – güzel azamet
- Colias thisoa (Ménétriés, 1832) – Turan azameti
- Colotis fausta (Olivier, 1804) – Mezopotamya kolotisi
- Euchloe ausonia (Hübner, 1805) – dağ öyklosu
- Euchloe belemia (Esper, 1800) – Akdeniz öyklosu
- Euchloe penia (Freyer, 1852) – doğu elfinstonyası
- Gonepteryx cleopatra (Linnaeus, 1767) – Kleopatra
- Gonepteryx farinosa (Zeller, 1847) – Anadolu orakkanadı
- Gonepteryx rhamni (Linnaeus, 1758) – orakkanat
- Leptidea duponcheli (Staudinger, 1871) – doğulu narinormanbeyazı
- Leptidea morsei (Fenton, [1882]) – Fenton'un narinormanbeyazı
- Leptidea sinapis (Linnaeus, 1758) – narin ormanbeyazı
- Pieris bowdeni (Eitschberger, 1983) – Bowden'in beyazmeleği
- Pieris brassicae (Linnaeus, 1758) – büyük beyazmelek or lahanakelebeği
- Pieris bryoniae (Hübner, 1806) – çizgili dağbeyazmeleği
- Pieris ergane (Geyer, [1828]) – dağ küçük beyazmeleği or dağ beyazmeleği
- Pieris krueperi (Staudinger, 1860) – krüper'in beyazmeleği
- Pieris mannii (Mayer, 1851) – mann'ın beyazmeleği
- Pieris napi (Linnaeus, 1758) – yeşildamarlı beyaz
- Pieris persis (Verity, 1922) – İran beyazmeleği
- Pieris pseudorapae (Verity, [1908]) – yalancı beyazmelek
- Pieris rapae (Linnaeus, 1758) – küçük beyazmelek
- Pontia callidice (Hübner, [1799–1800]) – dorukların beneklimeleği
- Pontia chloridice (Hübner, [1808–1813]) – küçük beneklimelek
- Pontia daplidice (Linnaeus, 1758) – beneklimelek
- Pontia edusa (Fabricius, 1777) – yeni benekli melek
- Zegris eupheme (Esper, 1804) – zegris

== Riodinidae ==
- Hamearis lucina (Linnaeus, 1758) – incilikelebek

== Nymphalidae ==
- Aglais io (Linnaeus, 1758) – tavuskelebeği
- Aglais urticae (Linnaeus, 1758) – aglais
- Apatura ilia ([Schiffermüller], 1775) – küçük morimparator
- Apatura metis (Freyer, 1829) – Trakya imparatoru
- Aphantopus hyperantus (Linnaeus, 1758) – halkacık
- Araschnia levana (Linnaeus, 1758) – ısırgan kelebeği
- Arethusana arethusa ([Denis & Schiffermüller, 1775]) – seyit
- Argynnis pandora ([Schiffermüller], 1775) – bahadır
- Argynnis paphia (Linnaeus, 1758) – cengaver
- Boloria caucasica (Lederer, 1852) – Kafkas menekşekelebeği
- Boloria graeca (Staudinger, 1870) – Balkan menekşekelebeği
- Brenthis daphne (Bergsträsser, 1780) – böğürtlen brentisi
- Brenthis hecate ([Denis & Schiffermüller], 1775) – çift noktalı brentis
- Brenthis ino (Rottemburg, 1775) – küçük brentis
- Brenthis mofidii (Wyatt, 1968) – İran brentisi
- Brintesia circe (Fabricius, 1775) – karamurat
- Charaxes jasius (Linnaeus, 1767) – çift kuyruklu paşa
- Chazara bischoffii (Herrich-Schäffer, [1846]) – kızıl cadı
- Chazara briseis (Linnaeus, 1764) – cadı
- Chazara egina (Staudinger, [1892]) – Anadolu cadısı
- Chazara persephone (Hübner, [1805]) – stepcadısı
- Clossiana dia (Linnaeus, 1767) – morinci
- Clossiana euphrosyne (Linnaeus, 1758) – beyazinci
- Coenonympha arcania (Linnaeus, 1761) – funda zıpzıp perisi
- Coenonympha glycerion (Borkhausen, 1788) – orman zıpzıp perisi
- Coenonympha leander (Esper, 1784) – Rus zıpzıp perisi
- Coenonympha pamphilus (Linnaeus, 1758) – küçük zıpzıp perisi
- Coenonympha saadi (Kollar, [1849]) – İran zıpzıp perisi
- Coenonympha symphita (Lederer, 1870) – Kafkasya zıpzıp perisi
- Danaus chrysippus (Linnaeus, 1758) – sultan
- Erebia aethiops (Esper, 1777) – İskoç güzelesmeri
- Erebia graucasica (Jachontov, 1909) – Kafkas güzelesmeri
- Erebia hewitsonii (Lederer, 1864) – Laz güzelesmeri
- Erebia iranica (Grum-Grshimailo, 1895) – acem güzelesmeri
- Erebia ligea (Linnaeus, 1758) – güzelesmer
- Erebia medusa (Fabricius, 1787) – orman güzelesmeri
- Erebia melancholica (Herrich-Schäffer, [1846]) – mecnun güzelesmeri
- Erebia ottomana (Herrich-Schäffer, [1847]) – Osmanlı güzelesmeri or harem güzelesmeri
- Euapatura mirza (Ebert, 1971) – şehzade
- Euphydryas aurinia (Rottemburg, 1775) – nazuğum
- Euphydryas orientalis (Herrich-Schäffer, [1851]) – güzel nazuğum
- Fabriciana adippe (Schiffermüller, 1775) – büyük inci
- Fabriciana niobe (Linnaeus, 1758) – niyobe
- Hipparchia aristaeus (Bonelli, 1826) – Güney kızılmeleği
- Hipparchia fagi (Scopoli, 1763) – orman karameleği
- Hipparchia fatua (Freyer, 1845) – Anadolu karameleği
- Hipparchia mersina (Staudinger, 1871) – Mersin kızılmeleği
- Hipparchia parisatis (Kollar, [1849]) – beyaz bandlı karamelek
- Hipparchia pellucida (Stauder, 1924) – Anadolu kızılmeleği
- Hipparchia pisidice (Klug, 1832) – Arap karameleği
- Hipparchia statilinus (Hufnagel, 1766) – ağaç karameleği
- Hipparchia syriaca (Staudinger, 1871) – büyük karamelek
- Hipparchia volgensis (Mazochin-Porshnyakov, 1952) – Rus kızılmeleği
- Hypolimnas misippus (Linnaeus, 1764) – hipolimnas
- Hyponephele cadusia (Lederer, [1869]) – İran esmerperisi
- Hyponephele hasantahsin (Kocjak & Kemal, 2002) – hasan tahsin esmerperisi
- Hyponephele kocaki (Eckweiler, 1978) – Koçak'ın esmerperisi
- Hyponephele lupina (Costa, 1836) – esmerperi
- Hyponephele lycaon (Kühn, 1774) – küçük esmerperi
- Hyponephele lycaonoides (Weiss, 1978) – yalancı esmerperi
- Hyponephele naricoides (Gross, 1977) – Gross'un esmerperisi
- Hyponephele urartua (de Freina & Aussem, 1986) – Urartu esmerperisi
- Hyponephele wagneri (Herrich-Schäffer, [1846]) – Ağrı esmerperisi
- Hyponephele zuvandica (Samodurow, Korolew & Tschikolowez, 1996) – Azeri esmerperi
- Issoria lathonia (Linnaeus, 1758) – İspanyol kraliçesi
- Junonia orithya (Linnaeus, 1758) – Dicle güzeli
- Kirinia clymene (Esper, 1783) – kaya esmeri
- Kirinia roxelana (Cramer, 1777) – ağaç esmeri
- Lasiommata maera (Linnaeus, 1758) – esmerboncuk
- Lasiommata megera (Linnaeus, 1767) – küçük esmerboncuk
- Lasiommata petropolitana (Fabricius, 1787) – orman esmerboncuk
- Libythea celtis (Laicharting, 1782) – çitlembikkelebeği
- Limenitis camilla (Linnaeus, 1764) – hanımelikelebeği
- Limenitis reducta (Staudinger, 1901) – Akdeniz hanımelikelebeği
- Maniola halicarnassus (Thomson, 1990) – Halikarnas esmeri
- Maniola jurtina (Linnaeus, 1758) – çayıresmeri
- Maniola megala (Oberthür, 1909) – büyük esmer
- Maniola telmessia (Zeller, 1847) – doğu çayıresmeri
- Melanargia galathea (Linnaeus, 1758) – orman melikesi
- Melanargia grumi (Standfuss, 1892) – çölmelikesi
- Melanargia hylata (Ménétriés, 1832) – Azeri melikesi
- Melanargia larissa (Geyer, [1828]) – Anadolu melikesi
- Melanargia russiae (Esper, 1783) – Uygur melikesi
- Melanargia syriaca (Oberthür, 1894) – kara melike
- Melanargia titea (Klug, 1982) – Levantin melikesi
- Melanargia wiskotti (Röber, 1896) – Akdeniz melikesi
- Melitaea arduinna (Esper, 1783) – Türkistan İparhanı
- Melitaea athalia (Rottemburg, 1775) – Amannisa
- Melitaea aurelia Nickerl, 1850 – güzel Amannisa
- Melitaea britomartis Assmann, 1847 – melike Amannisa
- Melitaea caucasogenita Verity, 1930 – Kafkasyalı Amannisa
- Melitaea cinxia (Linnaeus, 1758) – İparhan
- Melitaea collina (Lederer, 1861) – Hataylı İparhan
- Melitaea diamina (Lang, 1789) – funda İparhanı
- Melitaea didyma (Esper, 1778) – benekli İparhan
- Melitaea interrupta (Kolenati, 1846) – Kafkasyalı İparhan
- Melitaea irka (Coutsis & van Oorschot, 2014) – Artvin İparhan
- Melitaea mesopotamica (Coutsis & van Oorschot, 2014) – Mezopotamya İparhan
- Melitaea ornata (Christoph, 1893) – Rusya İparhan
- Melitaea persea (Kollar, [1850]) – İran İparhan
- Melitaea phoebe (Goeze, 1779) – benekli büyük İparhan
- Melitaea syriaca (Rebel, 1905) – Suriye İparhan
- Minois dryas (Scopoli, 1763) – karahayalet
- Neptis rivularis (Scopoli, 1763) – süzülen karakız
- Nymphalis antiopa (Linnaeus, 1758) – sarı bandlı kadife
- Nymphalis l-album (Esper, 1781) – yalancı virgül
- Nymphalis polychloros (Linnaeus, 1758) – karaağaç nimfalisi
- Nymphalis xanthomelas (Esper, 1781) – sarı ayaklı nimfalis
- Polygonia c-album (Linnaeus, 1758) – yırtıkpırtık
- Polygonia egea (Cramer, [1775]) – Anadolu yırtıkpırtığı
- Pararge aegeria (Linnaeus, 1758) – karanlık ormanesmeri
- Proclossiana eunomia (Esper, 1800) – bataklık noktalıkelebeği
- Proterebia afra (Fabricius, 1787) – Uygur guzelesmeri
- Pseudochazara anthelea (Hübner, [1823–1824]) – Anadolu yalancıcadısı
- Pseudochazara aurantiaca (Staudinger, 1871) – doruk yalancıcadısı
- Pseudochazara beroe (Herrich-Schäffer, [1844]) – dağ yalancıcadısı
- Pseudochazara geyeri (Herrich-Schäffer, [1846]) – Geyer'in yalancı cadısı
- Pseudochazara guriensis (Staudinger, 1878) – Gürcistan yalancıcadısı
- Pseudochazara lydia (Staudinger, 1878) – Lidya yalancı cadısı
- Pseudochazara mamurra (Herrich-Schäffer, [1846]) – Osmanlı yalancıcadısı
- Pseudochazara mniszechii (Herrich-Schäffer, [1851]) – step yalancıcadısı
- Pseudochazara pelopea (Klug, 1832) – Levantin yalancıcadısı
- Pseudochazara schakuhensis (Staudinger, 1881) – İran yalancıcadısı
- Pseudochazara telephassa (Geyer, [1827]) – Turan yalancıcadısı
- Pyronia cecilia (Vallantin, 1894) – Sesilya
- Pyronia tithonus (Linnaeus, 1771) – pironiya
- Satyrus amasinus (Staudinger, 1861) – beyaz damarlı Pirireis
- Satyrus favonius (Staudinger, [1892]) – Anadolu Pirireisi
- Satyrus ferulus (Fabricius, 1793) – haşmetli Pirireis
- Satyrus iranicus (Schwingenschuss, 1939) – İran Pirireisi
- Satyrus parthicus (Lederer, 1869) – Kaspi Pirireisi
- Speyeria aglaja (Linnaeus, 1758) – güzel inci
- Thaleropis ionia (Fischer de Waldheim & Eversmann, 1851) – Anadolu şehzadesi
- Triphysa phryne (Pallas, 1771) – Sibirya perisi
- Vanessa atalanta (Linnaeus, 1758) – atalanta
- Vanessa cardui (Linnaeus, 1758) – dikenkelebeği
- Ypthima asterope (Klug, 1832) – Karagöz

== Lycaenidae ==
- Afarsia morgiana (Kirby, 1871) – İran çokgözlüsü
- Agriades pyrenaica (Boisduval, 1840) – Pirene çokgözlüsü
- Aricia agestis (Denis & Schiffermüller, 1775) – çokgözlü esmer
- Aricia anteros (Freyer, 1839) – çokgözlü Balkanmavisi
- Aricia artaxerxes (Fabricius, 1793) – çokgözlü ormanesmeri
- Aricia bassoni (Larsen, 1974) – çokgözlü Lübnanmavisi
- Aricia crassipuncta (Christoph, 1893) – çokgözlü Anadolumavisi
- Aricia hyacinthus (Herrich-Schäffer, [1847]) – Anadolu çokgözlüsü
- Aricia isaurica (Staudinger, 1870) – çokgözlü Torosmavisi
- Aricia teberdina (Sheljuzhko, 1934) – çokgözlü Teberdamavisi
- Aricia torulensis (Hesselbarth & Siepe, 1993) – çokgözlü Torulmavisi
- Athamanthia phoenicura (Lederer, [1870]) – İran bakırgüzeli
- Azanus jesous (Guérin-Méneville, 1849) – Afrika mücevher kelebeği
- Cacyreus marshalli (Butler, 1897) – geranyumbronzu
- Callophrys danchenkoi (Zhdanko, 1998) – Nahçıvan zümrütü
- Callophrys herculeana (Pfeiffer, 1927) – büyük zümrüt
- Callophrys mystaphia (Miller, 1913) – ışgınzümrütü or minikzümrüt
- Callophrys paulae (Pfeiffer, 1932) – Anadolu zümrütü
- Callophrys rubi (Linnaeus, 1758) – zümrüt
- Celastrina argiolus (Linnaeus, 1758) – kutsalmavi
- Cigaritis acamas (Klug, 1834) – Seytancık
- Cigaritis cilissa (Lederer, 1861) – Akdeniz Seytancığı
- Cigaritis uighurica (Kemal & Koçak, 2005) – Uygur Seytancığı
- Cupido alcetas (Hoffmannsegg, 1804) – Fransız everesi
- Cupido argiades (Pallas, 1771) – everes
- Cupido decoloratus (Staudinger, 1886) – Balkan everesi
- Cupido minimus (Fuessly, 1775) – minik Kupid
- Cupido osiris (Meigen, 1829) – mavi Osiris
- Cupido staudingeri (Christoph, 1873) – Staudinger'in minikmavisi
- Cyaniris bellis (Freyer, [1842]) – çokgözlü güzelmavi
- Cyaniris semiargus (Rottemburg, 1775) – Mazarinmavisi
- Eumedonia eumedon (Esper, 1780) – çokgözlü geraniummavisi
- Favonius quercus (Linnaeus, 1758) – mormeşe
- Freyeria trochylus (Freyer, 1845) – mücevher kelebeği
- Glaucopsyche alexis (Poda, 1761) – Karagözmavisi
- Glaucopsyche astraea (Freyer, [1851]) – Anadolu Karagözmavisi
- Iolana lessei (Bernardi, 1964) – dev mavi
- Kretania alcedo (Christoph, 1877) – acem çokgözlüsü
- Kretania eurypilus (Freyer, 1852) – doğulu esmergöz
- Kretania modica (Verity, 1935) – Anadolu esmergözü
- Kretania nicholli (Elwes, 1901) – Lübnan esmergözü
- Kretania sephirus (Frivaldszky, 1835) – Balkan esmergözü
- Kretania zephyrinus (Christoph, 1884) – Türkmenistan esmergözü
- Lampides boeticus (Linnaeus, 1767) – lampides
- Leptotes pirithous (Linnaeus, 1767) – mavi zebra
- Luthrodes galba (Lederer, 1855) – Akdeniz mücevherkelebeği
- Lycaena alciphron (Rottemburg, 1775) – büyük morbakırgüzeli
- Lycaena asabinus (Herrich-Schäffer, [1851]) – Anadolu ateşgüzeli
- Lycaena candens (Herrich-Schäffer, [1844]) – ateşbakırgüzeli
- Lycaena dispar (Haworth, 1802) – büyük bakırgüzeli
- Lycaena lampon (Lederer, [1870]) – İranateşgüzeli
- Lycaena ochimus (Herrich-Schäffer, [1851]) – alevli ateşgüzeli
- Lycaena ottomanus (Lefèbvre, 1830) – Osmanlıateşi
- Lycaena phlaeas (Linnaeus, 1761) – beneklibakırgüzeli
- Lycaena thersamon (Esper, 1784) – küçük ateşgüzeli
- Lycaena thetis (Klug, 1834) – dağateşi
- Lycaena tityrus (Poda, 1761) – islibakırgüzeli
- Lycaena virgaureae (Linnaeus, 1758) – ormanbakırgüzeli
- Lysandra bellargus (Rottemburg, 1775) – çokgözlü gökmavisi
- Lysandra coridon (Poda, 1761) – çokgözlü çillimavi
- Lysandra corydonius (Herrich-Schäffer, [1852]) – çokgözlü yalancıçillimavi
- Lysandra dezina de Freina & Witt, 1983 – çokgözlü Hakkariçillisi
- Lysandra ossmar (Gerhard, 1851) – çokgözlü Anadoluçillimavisi
- Lysandra syriaca (Tutt, 1914) – çokgözlü Levantinçillimavisi
- Margelycaena euphratica (Eckweiler, 1989) – Fıratbakırgüzeli
- Neolycaena soezen (Seven, 2014) – Sözen'in çokgözlüsü
- Neolysandra coelestina (Eversmann, 1843) – çokgözlü Rusmavisi
- Neolysandra diana (Miller, [1913]) – çokgözlü Dianamavisi
- Neolysandra fatima Eckweiler & Schurian, 1980 – çokgözlü Fatmamavisi
- Phengaris alcon (Denis & Schiffermüller, 1775) – küçük korubeni
- Phengaris arion (Linnaeus, 1758) – büyük korubeni
- Phengaris nausithous (Bergsträsser, [1779]) – esmer korubeni
- Phengaris rebeli (Hirschke, 1904) – Rebel'in korubenisi
- Plebejidea loewii (Zeller, 1847) – çokgözlü gümüşmavi
- Plebejus argus (Linnaeus, 1758) – gümüşlekeli esmergöz
- Plebejus argyrognomon (Bergstrasser, [1779]) – Avrupalı esmergöz
- Plebejus christophi (Staudinger, 1874) – Christoph'un esmergözü
- Plebejus idas (Linnaeus, 1761) – İdasmavisi or esmergöz
- Plebejus maracandica (Erschoff, 1874) – Kızılkum esmergözü
- Polyommatus actis actis (Herrich-Schäffer, [1851]) – lacivert Anadolu çokgözlüsü
- Polyommatus actis bilgini (Dantchenko & Lukhtanov, 2002) – çokgözlü Bilginmavisi or Bilgin'in çokgözlüsü
- Polyommatus actis haigi (Dantchenko & Lukhtanov, 2002) – çokgözlü Karabetmavisi
- Polyommatus admetus (Esper, 1783) – anormal çokgözlü
- Polyommatus aedon (Christoph, 1887) – çokgözlü Edonmavisi
- Polyommatus alcestis (Zerny, 1932) – çokgözlü Lübnanesmeri
- Polyommatus alibalii (Carbonell, 2015) – Bali'in çokgözlüsü
- Polyommatus altivagans (Forster, 1956) – lacivert Azeri çokgözlüsü
- Polyommatus amandus (Schneider, 1792) – çokgözlü Amanda
- Polyommatus anticarmon (Koçak, 1983) – çokgözlü antikarmon
- Polyommatus antidolus (Rebel, 1901) – çokgözlü Anadolutüylüsü
- Polyommatus antiochenus (Lederer, 1861) – Hatay'ın çokgözlü güzelmavisi
- Polyommatus aroaniensis (Brown, 1976) – Yunan anormal çokgözlüsü
- Polyommatus artvinensis (Carbonell, 1997) – çokgözlü Artvinmavisi
- Polyommatus athis athis ((Freyer, 1851) – Freyer'in çokgözlüsü
- Polyommatus athis sigberti ((Olivier & van der Poorten & De Prins & De Prins, 2000) – Sigbert Wagener'in çokgözlüsü
- Polyommatus baytopi (de Lesse, 1959) – Baytop'un çokgözlüsü
- Polyommatus bollandi (Dumont, 1998) – çokgözlü Hataymavisi
- Polyommatus buzulmavi (Carbonell, 1991) – çokgözlü buzulmavi
- Polyommatus caeruleus (Staudinger, 1871) – çokgözlü masmavi
- Polyommatus cilicius (Carbonell, 1998) – Gülek çokgözlüsü
- Polyommatus ciloicus (de Freina & Witt, 1983) – çokgözlü Cilomavisi
- Polyommatus cornelius (Gerhard, 1851) – çokgözlü küçük Turanmavisi
- Polyommatus cyaneus (Staudinger, 1899) – çokgözlü Siyanmavisi
- Polyommatus dama (Staudinger, 1891) – çokgözlü Mezopotamyamavisi
- Polyommatus damon ([Schiffermüller], 1775) – çokgözlü Damonmavisi
- Polyommatus dantchenkoi (Lukhtanov & Wiemers, 2003) – Dançenko çokgözlüsü
- Polyommatus daphnis (Schiffermüller, 1775) – çokgözlü Dafnis
- Polyommatus demavendi (Pfeiffer, 1938) – çokgözlü demavendesmeri
- Polyommatus dorylas (Denis & Schiffermüller, 1775) – çokgözlü turkuvazmavisi
- Polyommatus eriwanensis (Forster, 1960) – Erivan anormal çokgözlüsü
- Polyommatus eroides (Frivaldszky, 1835) – çokgözlü yalancıeros
- Polyommatus eros molleti (Carbonell, [1994]) – çokgözlü Bolkarmavisi
- Polyommatus erzindjanensis (Carbonell, 2002) – çokgözlü Erzincanmavisi
- Polyommatus escheri (Hübner, [1823]) – çokgözlü Eşermavisi
- Polyommatus eurypilos (Gerhard, [1851]) – çokgözlü Gerhardmavisi or Gerhard'ın çokgözlüsü
- Polyommatus forsteri (Pfeiffer, 1938) – çokgözlü elburserosu
- Polyommatus guezelmavi (Olivier et al., 1999) – çokgözlü Anadolu güzelmavisi
- Polyommatus hopfferi (Herrich-Schäffer, [1851]) – Hopfer'in çokgözlüsü
- Polyommatus huberti (Carbonell, 1993) – De Lesse'in çokgözlüsü
- Polyommatus icarus (Rottemburg, 1775) – çokgözlü mavi
- Polyommatus igisizilim (Koçak & Kemal, 2001) – vatanmavisi
- Polyommatus iphicarmon (Eckweiler & Rose, 1993) – çokgözlü ifikarmon
- Polyommatus iphigenia (Herrich-Schäffer, [1847]) – çokgözlü ifigenya
- Polyommatus kanduli kanduli (Dantchenko & Lukhtanov, 2002) – Kandul'in çokgözlüsü
- Polyommatus kanduli tortumensis (Carbonell, 2003) – Tortum çokgözlüsü
- Polyommatus kanduli urartua (Carbonell, 2003) – Urartumavisi
- Polyommatus lycius (Carbonell, 1996) – Carbonellmavisi
- Polyommatus maraschi (Forster, 1956) – çokgözlü Maraşmavisi or Maraş çokgözlüsü
- Polyommatus menalcas (Freyer, [1837]) – çokgözlü Anadolu beyazı
- Polyommatus merhaba (de Prins et al., 1991) – çokgözlü selammavisi
- Polyommatus mithridates (Toso & Balletto, 1976) – çokgözlü Amasyaesmeri
- Polyommatus myrrhinus (Herrich-Schäffer, [1852]) – çokgözlü büyük Turanmavisi
- Polyommatus ninae (Forster, 1956) – Nina'nın çokgözlüsü
- Polyommatus persicus (Bienert, 1870) – çokgözlü acemmavisi
- Polyommatus phyllis (Christoph, 1877) – çokgözlü İranmavisi
- Polyommatus pierceae (Lukhtanov & Dantchenko, 2002) – Pierce'nin çokgözlüsü
- Polyommatus poseidon (Herrich-Schäffer, 1851) – çokgözlü Poseydonmavisi
- Polyommatus pseudactis (Forster, 1960) – yalancı lacivert Anadolu çokgözlüsü
- Polyommatus putnami (Dantchenko & Lukhtanov, 2002) – Putnam'ın çokgözlüsü
- Polyommatus ripartii (Freyer, 1830) – Rippert De Beaugency'ın anormal çokgözlüsü
- Polyommatus schuriani (Rose, 1978) – çokgözlü Kunchuymavisi
- Polyommatus schuriani attalaensis (Carbonell, Borie & J. de Prins, 2004) – attalos mavisi
- Polyommatus sertavulensis (Koçak, 1979) – Sertavul çokgözlüsü
- Polyommatus surakovi (Dantchenko & Lukhtanov, 1994) – çokgözlü surakomavisi
- Polyommatus tankeri (de Lesse, 1960) – Tanker'in çokgözlüsü
- Polyommatus theresiae (Schurian, van Oorschot & van den Brink, 1992) – çokgözlü Teresya
- Polyommatus thersites (Cantener, 1834) – çokgözlü menekşemavisi
- Polyommatus turcicolus (Koçak, 1977) – çokgözlü Vanmavisi
- Polyommatus turcicus (Koçak, 1977) – çokgözlü Türkmavisi
- Polyommatus vanensis (de Lesse, 1957) – çokgözlü Ağrımavisi
- Polyommatus wagneri (Forster, 1956) – Wagner'in çokgözlüsü
- Polyommatus zapvadi (Carbonell, 1993) – çokgözlü Zapmavisi
- Pseudophilotes bavius (Eversmann, 1832) – Bavius mavisi
- Pseudophilotes vicrama (Moore, 1865) – Himalaya mavi kelebeği
- Rueckbeilia rosei (Eckweiler, 1989) – Rose'nin çokgözlüsü
- Satyrium abdominalis (Gerhard, 1850) – sevbeni
- Satyrium acaciae (Fabricius, 1787) – minik sevbeni
- Satyrium armenum (Rebel, 1901) – mavi sevbeni
- Satyrium hyrcanicum (Riley, 1939) – büyük benekli sevbeni
- Satyrium ilicis (Esper, 1779) – büyük sevbeni
- Satyrium ledereri (Boisduval, 1848) – küçük benekli sevbeni
- Satyrium marcidum (Riley, 1921) – İranlı sevbeni
- Satyrium spini (Fabricius, 1787) – güzel sevbeni
- Satyrium w-album (Knoch, 1782) – karaağaç sevbenisi
- Satyrium zabni (van Oorschot & van den Brink, 1991) – mavibenekli sevbeni
- Scolitantides orion (Pallas, 1771) – karamavi
- Tarucus balkanicus (Freyer, 1844) – Balkankaplanı
- Thecla betulae (Linnaeus, 1758) – huşgüzeli
- Tomares callimachus (Eversmann, 1848) – Kafkasya gelinciği
- Tomares desinens (Nekrutenko & Effendi, 1980) – Azeri gelinciği
- Tomares nesimachus (Oberthür, 1893) – Akdeniz gelinciği or akbes
- Tomares nogelii dobrogensis (Caradja, 1895) – Romen gelinciği
- Tomares nogelii nogelii (Herrich-Schäffer, [1851]) – Anadolu gelinciği
- Tomares romanovi (Christoph, 1882) – Romanov gelinciği
- Turanana cytis (Christoph, 1877) – İran Turanmavisi
- Turanana panagaea (Herrich-Schäffer, [1851]) – Anadolu Turanmavisi
- Turanana taygetica (Rebel, 1902) – Yunan Turanmavisi
- Zizeeria karsandra (Moore, 1865) – karsandra

== Hesperiidae ==
- Carcharodus alceae (Esper, 1780) – hatmi zıpzıpı
- Carcharodus flocciferus (Zeller, 1847) – tüylü zıpzıp
- Carcharodus lavatherae (Esper, 1783) – mermer zıpzıpı
- Carcharodus orientalis (Reverdin, 1913) – şark zıpzıpı
- Carcharodus stauderi (Reverdin, 1913) – Cezayir zıpzıpı
- Carterocephalus palaemon (Pallas, 1771) – sarıbenekli zıpzıp
- Eogenes alcides (Herrich-Schäffer, [1852]) – alsides zıpzıpı
- Eogenes lesliei (Evans, 1910) – Pakistan zıpzıpı
- Erynnis marloyi (Boisduval, [1834]) – kara zıpzıp
- Erynnis tages (Linnaeus, 1758) – paslı zıpzıp
- Gegenes nostrodamus (Fabricius, 1793) – Nostrodamus
- Gegenes pumilio (Hoffmannsegg, 1804) – cüce zıpzıp
- Hesperia comma (Linnaeus, 1758) – gümüş benekli zıpzıp
- Heteropterus morpheus (Pallas, 1771) – beyaz benekli zıpzıp
- Muschampia nomas (Lederer, 1855) – Suriye zıpzıpı
- Muschampia plurimacula (Christoph, 1893) – benekli zıpzıp
- Muschampia poggei (Lederer, 1858) – Pogge zıpzıpı
- Muschampia proteides (Wagner, 1929) – Anadolu zıpzıpı
- Muschampia proto (Ochsenheimer, 1808) – Akdeniz zıpzıpı
- Muschampia tessellum (Hübner, [1800–1803])) – mozaik zıpzıpı
- Ochlodes sylvanus (Esper, 1777) – orman zıpzıpı
- Pelopidas thrax (Hübner, [1821]) – beyaz çilli kara zıpzıp
- Pyrgus aladaghensis (de Prins & Poorten, 1995) – Aladağ zıpzıpı
- Pyrgus alveus (Hübner, [1800–1803]) – büyük boz zıpzıp
- Pyrgus armoricanus (Oberthür, 1910) – İspanyol zıpzıpı
- Pyrgus bolkariensis (de Prins & Poorten, 1995) – Bolkar zıpzıpı
- Pyrgus carthami (Hübner, [1813]) – nadir zıpzıp
- Pyrgus cinarae (Rambur, 1839) – güzel zıpzıp
- Pyrgus cirsii (Rambur, 1839) – beşparmakotu zıpzıpı
- Pyrgus jupei (Alberti, 1967) – Kafkasya zıpzıpı
- Pyrgus malvae (Linnaeus, 1758) – ebegümeci zıpzıpı
- Pyrgus melotis (Duponchel, [1834]) – Ege zıpzıpı
- Pyrgus serratulae (Rambur, 1839) – zeytuni zıpzıp
- Pyrgus sidae (Esper, 1784) – sarıbandlı zıpzıp
- Spialia orbifer (Hübner, [1823]) – kızıl zıpzıp
- Spialia osthelderi (Pfeiffer, 1932) – Maraş zıpzıpı
- Spialia phlomidis (Herrich-Schäffer, [1845]) – acem zıpzıpı
- Thymelicus acteon (Rottemburg, 1775) – sarılekeli zıpzıp
- Thymelicus hyrax (Lederer, 1861) – Levantin zıpzıpı
- Thymelicus lineolus (Ochsenheimer, 1808) – siyah antenli zıpzıp
- Thymelicus novus (Reverdin, 1916) – yeni zıpzıp
- Thymelicus sylvestris (Poda, 1761) – sarı-antenli zıpzıp
