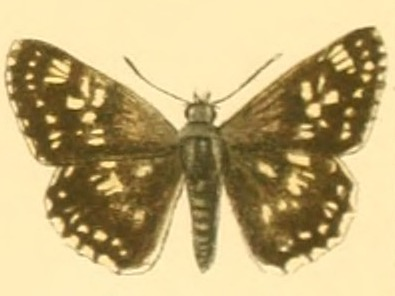

Scientific classification
- Domain: Eukaryota
- Kingdom: Animalia
- Phylum: Arthropoda
- Class: Insecta
- Order: Lepidoptera
- Family: Hesperiidae
- Genus: Muschampia
- Species: M. protheon

Binomial name
- Muschampia protheon (Rambur, 1858)

= Muschampia protheon =

Species of butterfly

Muschampia protheon is a small butterfly found in the East Palearctic (Central China (Kuku-Noor) to East Mongolia and Transbaikalia ) that belongs to the skippers family.

== Description from Seitz ==
H. protheon Rambr. (85 f). Five apical dots: all the spots of the upperside distinct. Hindwing beneath light brown; subterminal band composed of distinctly separated spots. The white spot between veins 3 and 4 less projecting than the cell-spot situated above it. South Russia.

== Biology ==
The larva feeds on Phlomoides tuberosa.

== See also ==
- List of butterflies of Russia
