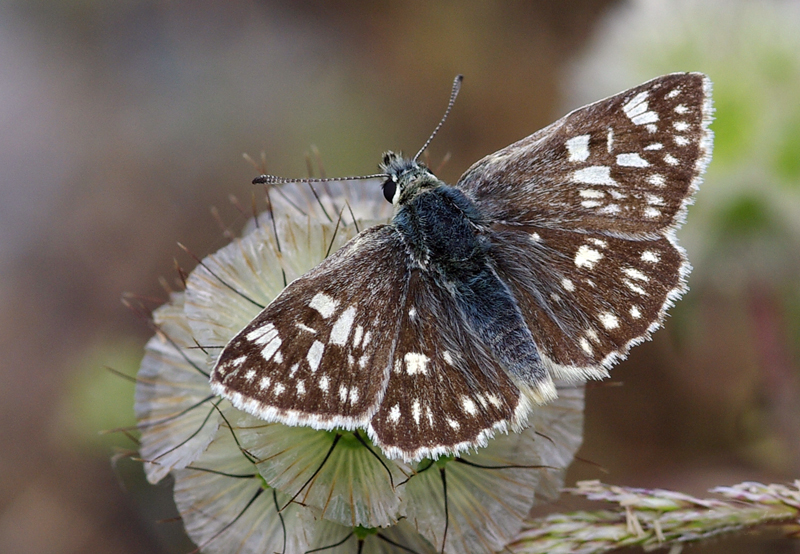
- Muschampia tessellum

Scientific classification
- Kingdom: Animalia
- Phylum: Arthropoda
- Class: Insecta
- Order: Lepidoptera
- Family: Hesperiidae
- Subfamily: Pyrginae
- Tribe: Carcharodini
- Subtribe: Carcharodina
- Genus: Muschampia; Tutt, [1906]

= Muschampia =

Genus of butterflies

Muschampia is a Palearctic genus of spread-winged skippers in the family Hesperiidae.

== Species ==
These species belong to the genus Muschampia:

- Muschampia alta (Schwingenschuss, 1942) Southern Italy, Balkan Peninsula
- Muschampia antonia (Speyer, 1879) Central Asia, Kazakhstan, Afghanistan, north Tibet
- Muschampia baeticus (Rambur, 1840)
- Muschampia dravira (Moore, [1875])
- Muschampia floccifera (Zeller, 1847)
- Muschampia gigas (Bremer, 1864) east China, Amur Oblast
- Muschampia kuenlunus (Grum-Grshimailo, 1893) Central Asia (Alay Mountains, west Pamirs, Tian-Shan).
- Muschampia lavatherae (Esper, 1783)
- Muschampia leuzeae (Oberthür, 1881)
- Muschampia lutulentus (Grum-Grshimailo, 1887) Syria, Mesopotamia to Central Asia, Afghanistan
- Muschampia mohammed (Oberthür, 1887)
- Muschampia musta Evans, 1949 Afghanistan
- Muschampia nobilis (Staudinger, 1882) Central Asian mountain ranges
- Muschampia nomas (Lederer, 1855) Israel
- Muschampia orientalis (Reverdin, 1913)
- Muschampia plurimacula (Christoph, 1893) Hyrcania
- Muschampia poggei (Lederer, 1858) Asia Minor, Mesopotamia to Middle East, Transcaucasia
- Muschampia prometheus (Grum-Grshimailo, 1890) Central Asian mountain ranges
- Muschampia proteides (F.Wagner,1929) Central Asia (Alai, Ghissarsky, Tian-Shan), Afghanistan
- Muschampia proteus (Staudinger, 1886)
- Muschampia protheon (Rambur, 1858) central China (Kuku-Noor), east Mongolia to Transbaikalia
- Muschampia proto Ochsenheimer, 1808 (sage skipper)
- Muschampia stauderi (Reverdin, 1913)
- Muschampia staudingeri (Speyer, 1879) northeast Iran to Pamirs, Turkmenistan, Altai, west China
- Muschampia tersa Evans, 1949 Transcaucasia, Iran, Iraq
- Muschampia tessellum (Hübner, [1800-1803]) (tesselated skipper)

See also Muschampia cribrellum (Eversmann, 1841), later as Favria cribrellum (Eversmann, 1841) after revision.
