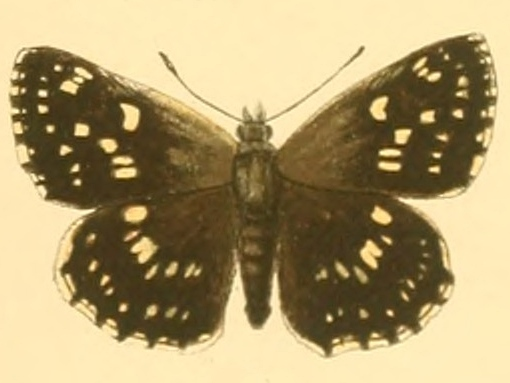
- Muschampia gigas in Seitz 85f

Scientific classification
- Domain: Eukaryota
- Kingdom: Animalia
- Phylum: Arthropoda
- Class: Insecta
- Order: Lepidoptera
- Family: Hesperiidae
- Genus: Muschampia
- Species: M. gigas

Binomial name
- Muschampia gigas (Bremer, 1864)

= Muschampia gigas =

Species of butterfly

Muschampia gigas is a small butterfly found in the East Palearctic (East China - Amurland.) that belongs to the skippers family.

== Description from Seitz ==
H. gigas Brem. (85 f). Upperside of the wings blackish grey. Size considerable, 48 to 50 mm. Ground of wings black. The white spots small. Female black, with the spots small and but little numerous. The hindwing black, ab. minor ab. nov. has only the size of tessellum and all the spots well developed. From Amurland.

== See also ==
- List of butterflies of Russia
