= Maurus vogelii =

Scientific classification
- Domain: Eukaryota
- Kingdom: Animalia
- Phylum: Arthropoda
- Class: Insecta
- Order: Lepidoptera
- Family: Lycaenidae
- Genus: Maurus; Bálint, 1991
- Species: M. vogelii

Binomial name
- Maurus vogelii (Oberthür, 1920)

Synonyms
- Lycaena vogelii Oberthür, 1920; Plebejus vogelii (Oberthür, 1920)

Species of insect

Maurus vogelii or Vogel's blue is a species of butterfly in the family Lycaenidae, found in Morocco, North Africa. It is the sole representative of the monotypic genus Maurus.
