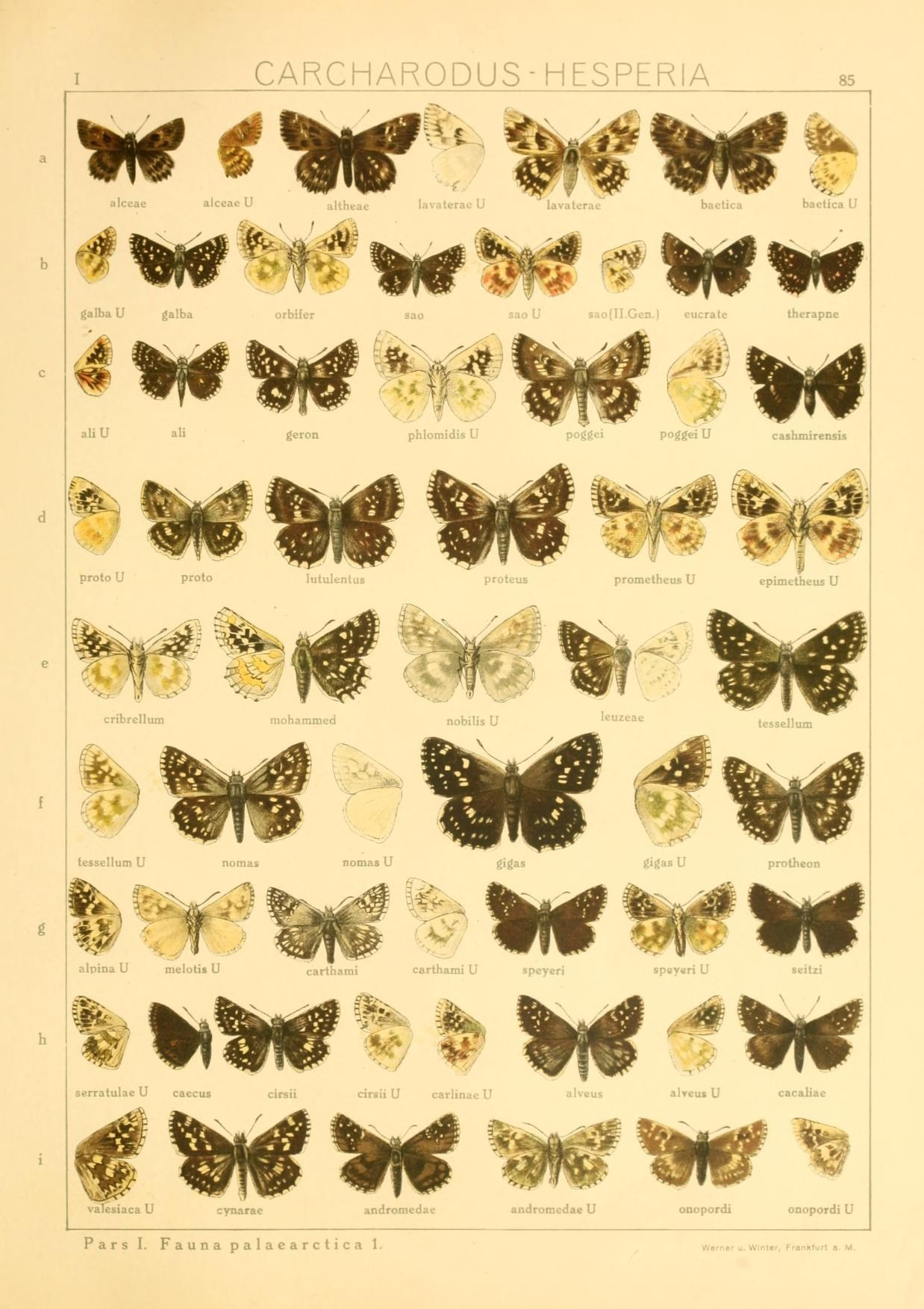
- Muschampia poggei in Seitz 85c

Scientific classification
- Kingdom: Animalia
- Phylum: Arthropoda
- Clade: Pancrustacea
- Class: Insecta
- Order: Lepidoptera
- Family: Hesperiidae
- Genus: Muschampia
- Species: M. poggei

Binomial name
- Muschampia poggei (Lederer, 1858)

= Muschampia poggei =

Species of butterfly

Muschampia poggei is a butterfly found in the East Palearctic (Asia Minor, Mesopotamia to Middle East, Transcaucasia) that belongs to the skipper family.

== Description from Seitz ==
H. poggei Led. (85 c). Costal fold of male very feebly developed, represented by a ridge on the costa. Hindwing beneath without white spot in the centre of interspace 7. Syria, Armenia.

== Biology ==
The larva feeds on Phlomis.
