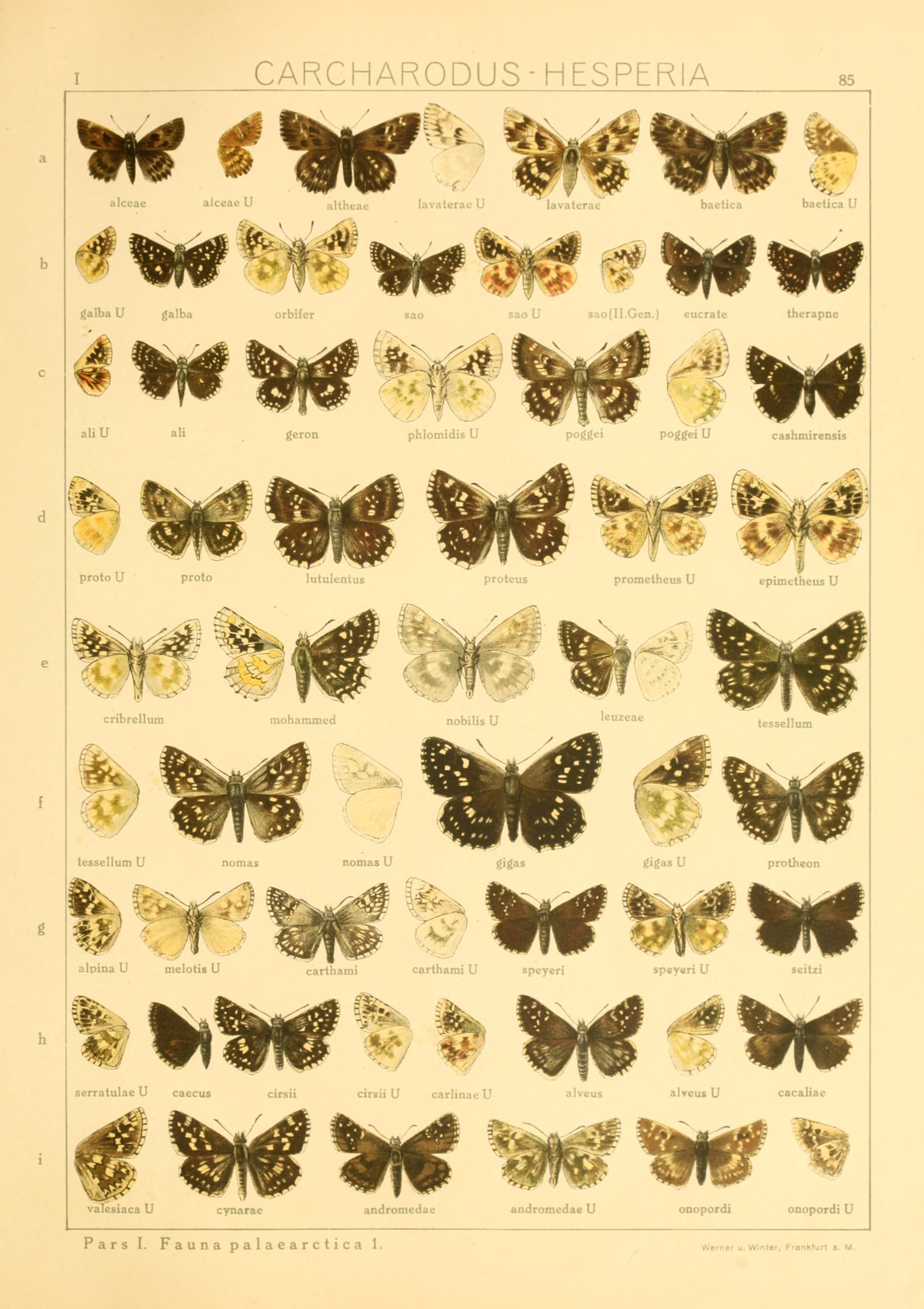
- Fourth butterfly on line "e"

Scientific classification
- Domain: Eukaryota
- Kingdom: Animalia
- Phylum: Arthropoda
- Class: Insecta
- Order: Lepidoptera
- Family: Hesperiidae
- Genus: Muschampia
- Species: M. leuzeae

Binomial name
- Muschampia leuzeae (Oberthür, 1881)

= Muschampia leuzeae =

Species of butterfly

Muschampia leuzeae, the Algerian grizzled skipper, is a butterfly of the family Hesperiidae. It is endemic to Algeria.

The length of the forewings is about 15 mm. Adults are on wing from May to July in two generations.

The larvae feed on Phlomis species.
