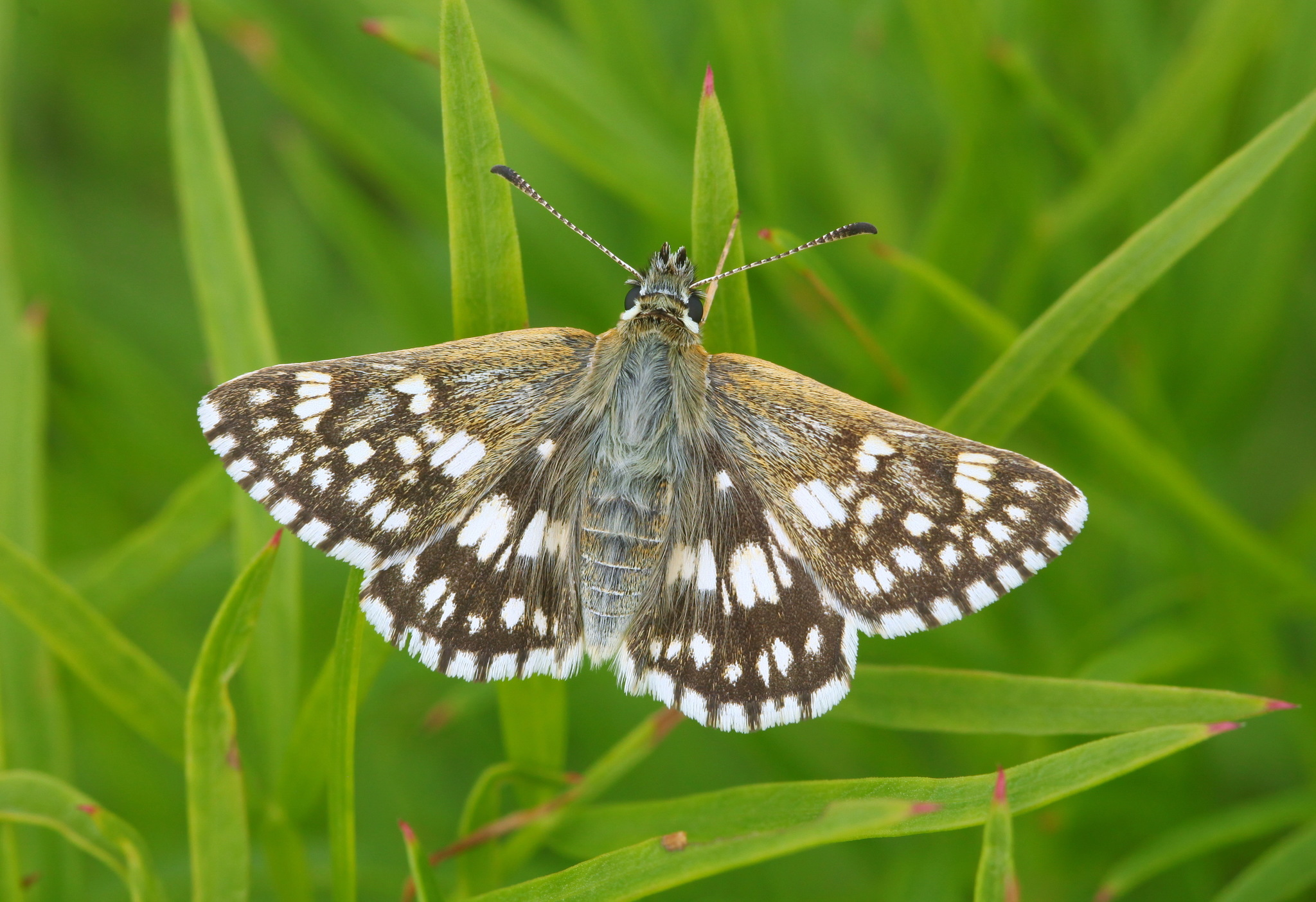
- Favria cribrellum, Russia

Scientific classification
- Kingdom: Animalia
- Phylum: Arthropoda
- Class: Insecta
- Order: Lepidoptera
- Family: Hesperiidae
- Subfamily: Pyrginae
- Tribe: Carcharodini
- Subtribe: Carcharodina
- Genus: Favria; Tutt, 1906
- Species: F. cribrellum

Binomial name
- Favria cribrellum (Eversmann, 1841)

= Favria cribrellum =

Species of butterfly

Favria is a monotypic genus of spread-wing skippers in the butterfly family Hesperiidae. This genus was formerly a synonym of Muschampia, and its only species, Favria cribrellum, was formerly a member of Muschampia. The species is commonly known as the spinose skipper.

The spinose skipper, a species of arid regions, is found in northern Hungary, Romania, Serbia, North Macedonia and Bulgaria, through Ukraine, southern Russia, up to the Altai and the Amur region.

== Description ==
The length of the forewings is 13–16 mm. This species resembles Muschampia tessellum but is usually smaller, has larger white markings on the upper side of the wings and a distinctively yellow underside of the hindwing.

== Description in Seitz ==
H. cribrellum Evers (85 e). The median band of the hindwing beneath does not terminate at vein 8, but extends beyond it. Hindtibia without brush of hair. Tarsi and tibiae spinose. The interspace between veins 7 and 8 of the hindwing beneath with only one white spots towards the middle; the whole area between the brown postmedian band and the fringes is white, as are also the veins. Four apical spots. South Russia, and from the Ural to Amurland and China. — In the form hybrida form. nov. [ H. cribrellum ssp. obscurior Staudinger, 1892 ] from Kentei, the upperside of the wings is dull black: at the apex of the cell a small ashy grey lunule. The two white smears before the two terminal spots of the median band are absent: the terminal spots of both fore- and hindwing are small and almost circular. Specimens from northern Amurland and Dauria with darker ground-colour and smaller white marginal dots are called obscurior [ H. cribrellum ssp. obscurior Staudinger, 1892 ] by Staudinger.

== Biology ==
Adults are on wing from May to June. There is one generation per year.

The larvae probably feed on Potentilla species.
