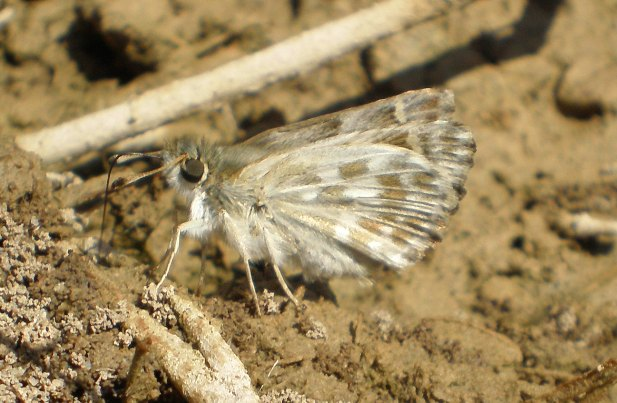
- Tàrrega, Catalonia

Conservation status
- Vulnerable (IUCN 3.1)

Scientific classification
- Kingdom: Animalia
- Phylum: Arthropoda
- Class: Insecta
- Order: Lepidoptera
- Family: Hesperiidae
- Genus: Muschampia
- Species: M. baeticus

Binomial name
- Muschampia baeticus (Rambur, 1842)

Synonyms
- Carcharodus baeticus (Rambur, 1842); Carcharodus boeticus; Reverdinus baeticus; Reverdinus boeticus; Reverdinus stauderi Reverdin, 1913

= Muschampia baeticus =

Species of butterfly

Muschampia baeticus, the southern marbled skipper, is a butterfly of the family Hesperiidae. It is found in North Africa, south-western Europe, Italy and Anatolia up to Afghanistan.

== Description ==
The forewing length is 13 to 14 millimeters. The upper surface of the forewings is marbled gray and slightly dark grey-brown.A narrow, grey discal band limits the darker basal region, and there are small hyaline spots on the forewing. The hind wing upper surface is dark brown with a small light basal spot and distinct discal and postdiscal spots and a large discoid spot. The underside of the forewings is grey-brown with light veins. The hind wing underside is light yellow-grey with white veins, basal and discal spots and postdiscal moons. Overall, they produce a net-like drawing. Both sexes have the same wing markings, the male has a thick growth of hair on the underside of the forewings.

Variability The 1st generation is always dark grey, the 2nd generation is light grey and the 3rd generation is light sand brown. The growth of hair is dark in moths in early summer and light sand-brown in later-flying insects.

== Biology ==
Adults are on wing from May to October in two or three generations. At higher altitudes there is only one generation.

The larvae feed on Marrubium vulgare and Ballota species.

This species was formerly a member of the genus Carcharodus. As a result of genomic research published in 2020, it was transferred to the genus Muschampia.
