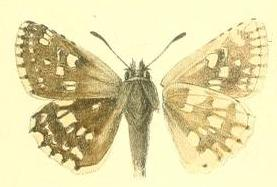

Scientific classification
- Domain: Eukaryota
- Kingdom: Animalia
- Phylum: Arthropoda
- Class: Insecta
- Order: Lepidoptera
- Family: Hesperiidae
- Genus: Muschampia
- Species: M. mohammed

Binomial name
- Muschampia mohammed (Oberthür, 1887)

Synonyms
- Syrichthus mohammed Oberthür, 1887; Syrichthus ahmed Oberthür, 1912; Hesperia caid Le Cerf, 1923

= Muschampia mohammed =

Species of butterfly

Muschampia mohammed, the Barbary skipper, is a butterfly of the family Hesperiidae. It is endemic to Morocco and Algeria. It is found in dry and flower-rich areas between 1,500 and 2,000 meters.

The length of the forewings is 15–16 mm, although the first generation is smaller, with a forewing length of about 14 mm. Adults are on wing from March to June in two generations.

The larvae feed on Phlomis species.
