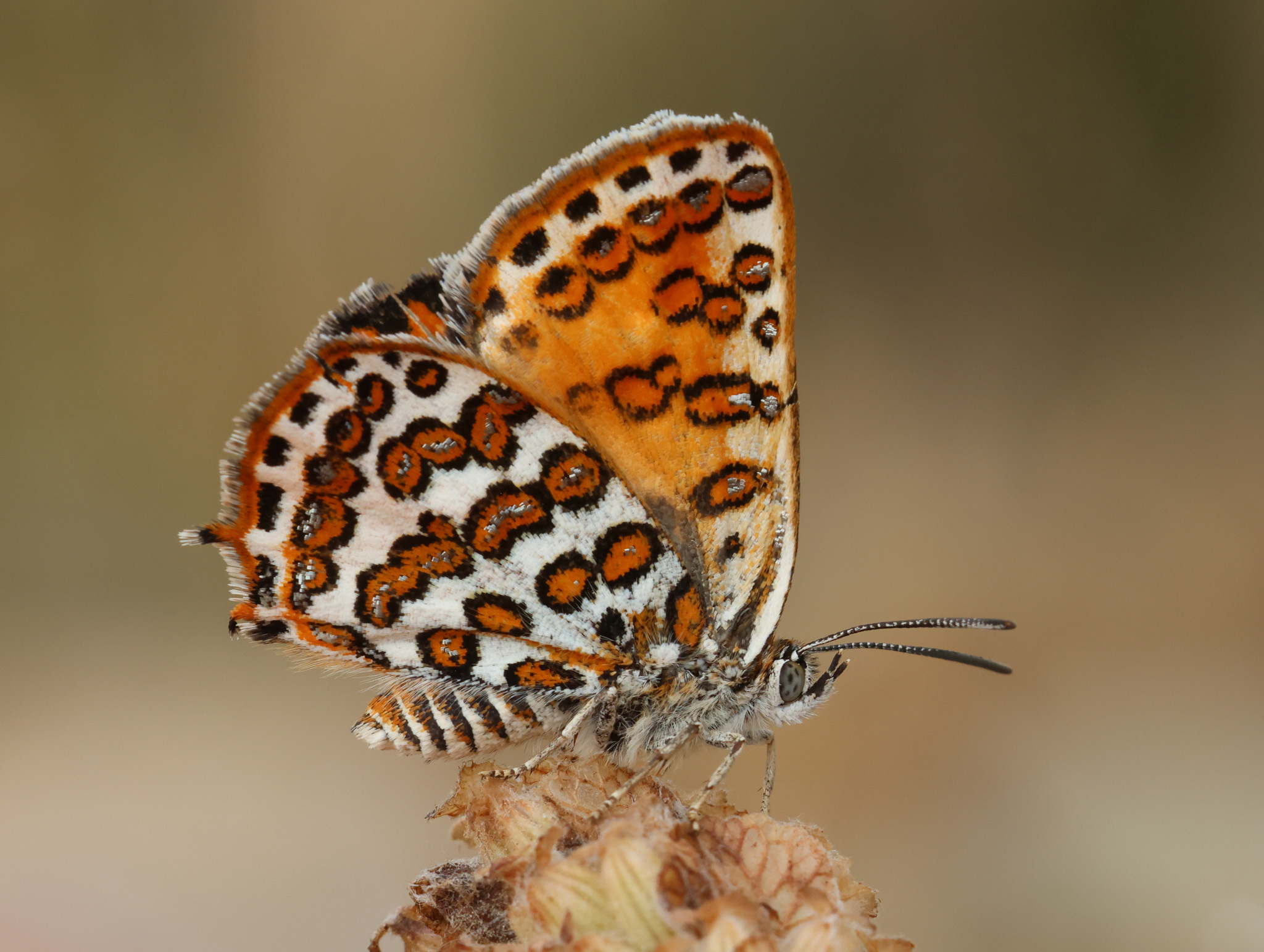
- Cigaritis allardi occidentalis, Morocco

Scientific classification
- Kingdom: Animalia
- Phylum: Arthropoda
- Clade: Pancrustacea
- Class: Insecta
- Order: Lepidoptera
- Family: Lycaenidae
- Genus: Cigaritis
- Species: C. allardi

Binomial name
- Cigaritis allardi (Oberthür, 1909)

= Cigaritis allardi =

Species of butterfly

Cigaritis allardi, Allard's silverline, is a butterfly in the family Lycaenidae. It is found in Algeria and Morocco (west of Algeria and in the west of the Anti-Atlas and the Middle Atlas in Morocco).

== Biology ==
The caterpillar is associated with Crematogaster ants - Crematogaster auberti, Crematogaster antaris, and Crematogaster scutellaris on its larval host plants Genista quadriflora, Cistus salvifolius, Helianthemum hirtum, and Fumana thymifolia. The biotope is grassy slopes.
