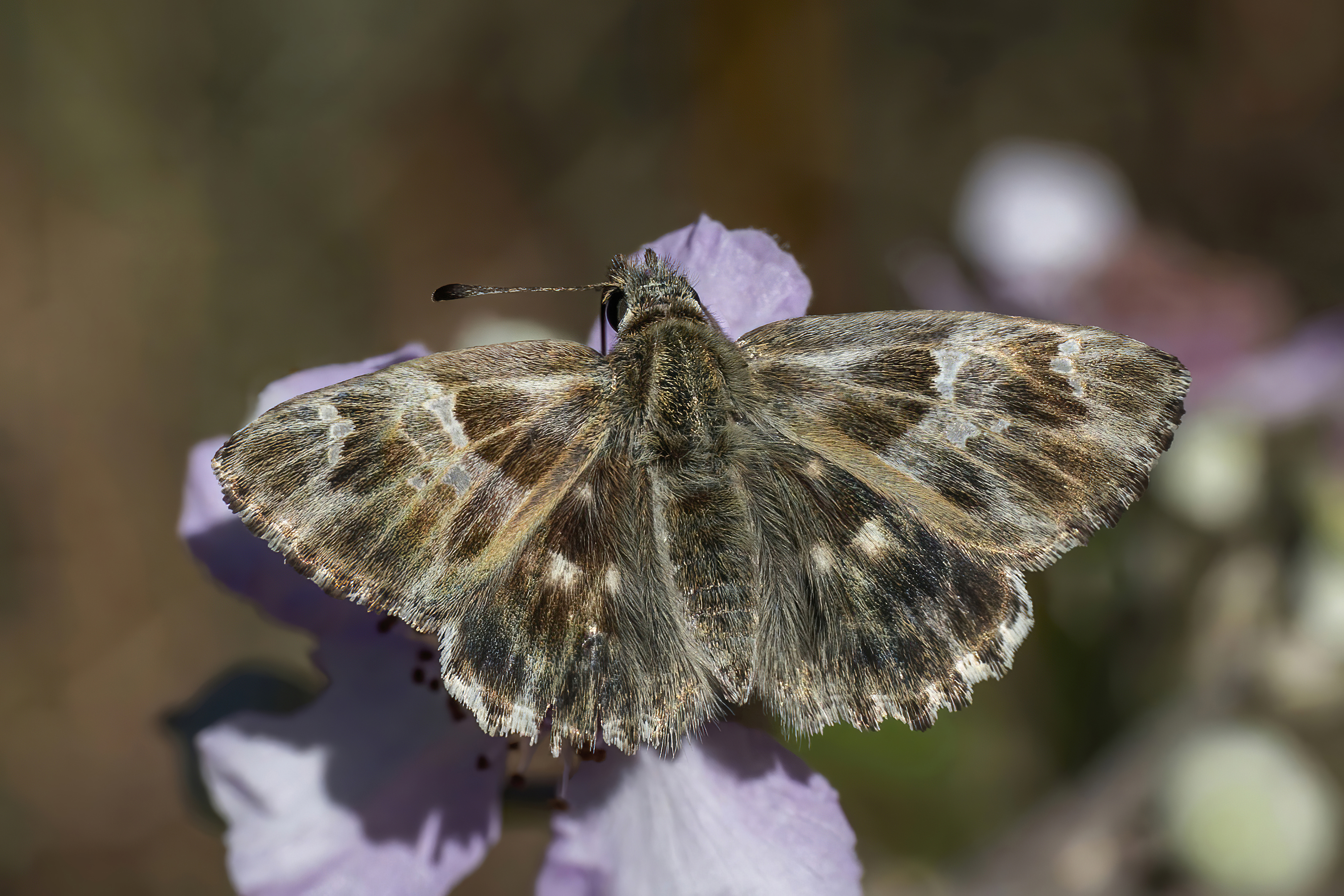
- in Corfu

Scientific classification
- Kingdom: Animalia
- Phylum: Arthropoda
- Class: Insecta
- Order: Lepidoptera
- Family: Hesperiidae
- Genus: Muschampia
- Species: M. orientalis

Binomial name
- Muschampia orientalis (Reverdin, 1913)

Synonyms
- Carcharodus orientalis Reverdin, 1913

= Muschampia orientalis =

Species of butterfly

Muschampia orientalis, the Oriental skipper, or Oriental marbled skipper, is a butterfly of the family Hesperiidae. It is found in Montenegro, Albania, North Macedonia, Romania, Bulgaria and Greece, east to Asia Minor, northern Iran, Ukraine, the Caucasus to Kazakhstan and Turkmenistan. There is a disjoint population in northern Hungary. In the south it is also found in Wadi Al Hisha (Jordan) and Israel.

== Description ==
The length of the forewings is 14–15 mm. The upperside is colored grey to brown with a little yellowish tone. The forewings are identical to those of Carcharodus flocciferus. There are distinct white discal and submarginal spots on the hind wings. The underside of the forewings is generally grey, that of the hindwings mostly light gray with faded light spots. On the underside of the forewings, the male also has thick, dark hair growth. Both sexes have the same wing markings. The variation in the size of the moths, but also in the coloration of the upper surface of the wings, is considerable.

== Biology ==
Adults are on wing from April to August in two generations.They are found on dry, hot, rocky and flowery slopes, ravines, (poor) meadows and abandoned cultivated land up to 1500 meters. The eggs are deposited on various types of mints (Lamiaceae) (e.g. Stachys and others). The caterpillar overwinters probably in the last instar

== Subspecies ==
There are at least three subspecies:

- Muschampia orientalis orientalis
- Muschampia orientalis maccabaeus Hemming, 1925 (Jordan, Israel)
- Muschampia orientalis teberdinus Devyatkin, 1990 (southern Russia)

This species was formerly a member of the genus Carcharodus. As a result of genomic research published in 2020, it was transferred to the genus Muschampia along with five other species.
