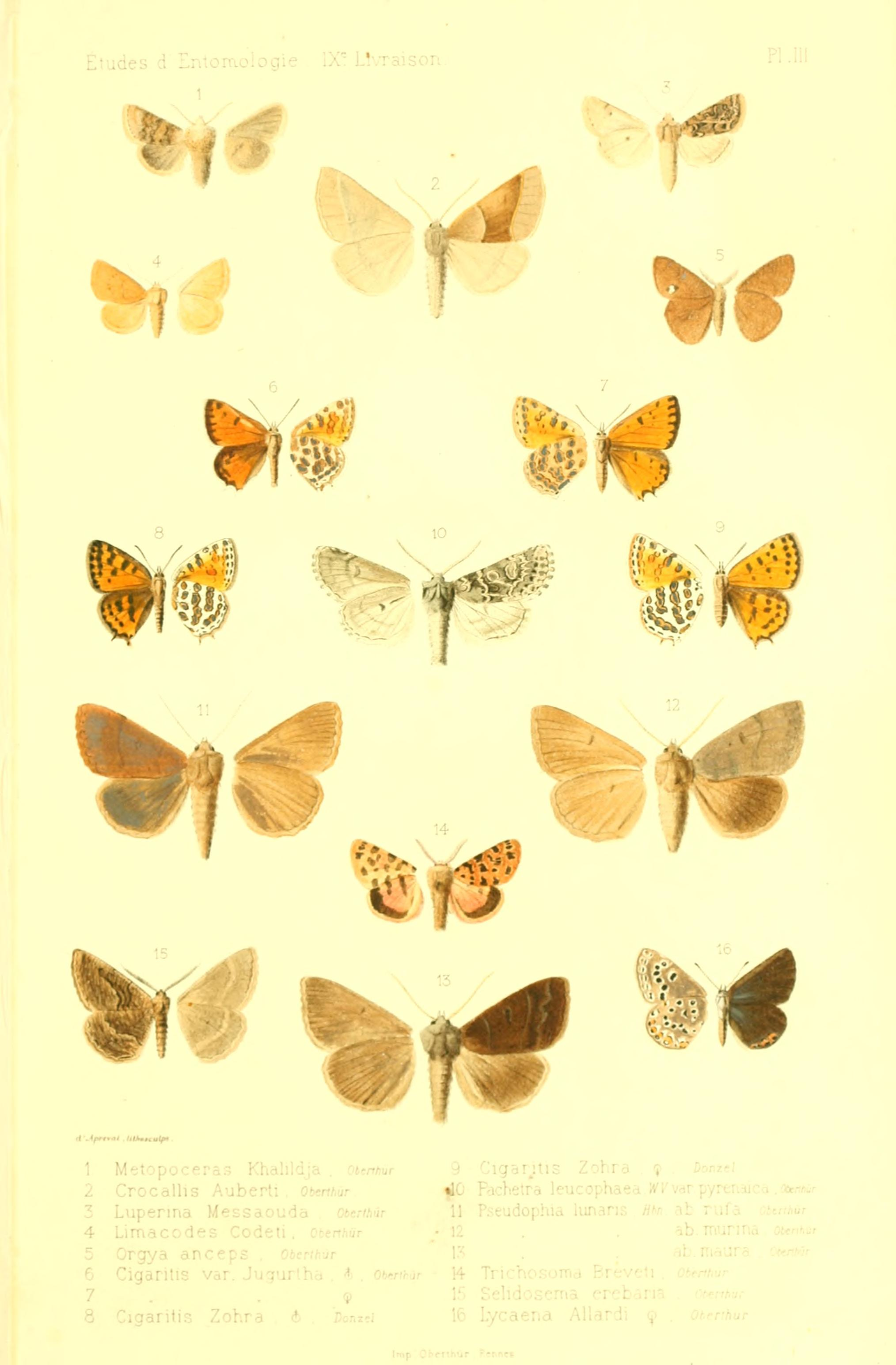
- Figures 6–9

Scientific classification
- Kingdom: Animalia
- Phylum: Arthropoda
- Clade: Pancrustacea
- Class: Insecta
- Order: Lepidoptera
- Family: Lycaenidae
- Genus: Cigaritis
- Species: C. zohra

Binomial name
- Cigaritis zohra Donzel, 1847

Synonyms
- Cigaritis masinissa Lucas, 1849; Cigaritis zohra confusa Oberthür, 1915; Cigaritis zohra littoralis Riley, 1925; Cigaritis zohra f. oberthueri Riley, 1925

= Cigaritis zohra =

Donzel's silverline

Species of butterfly

Cigaritis zohra, the Donzel's silverline, is a butterfly in the family Lycaenidae. It is found in Algeria and Morocco.

The larvae feed on Coronilla minima, in the later stages with Crematogaster ants.
