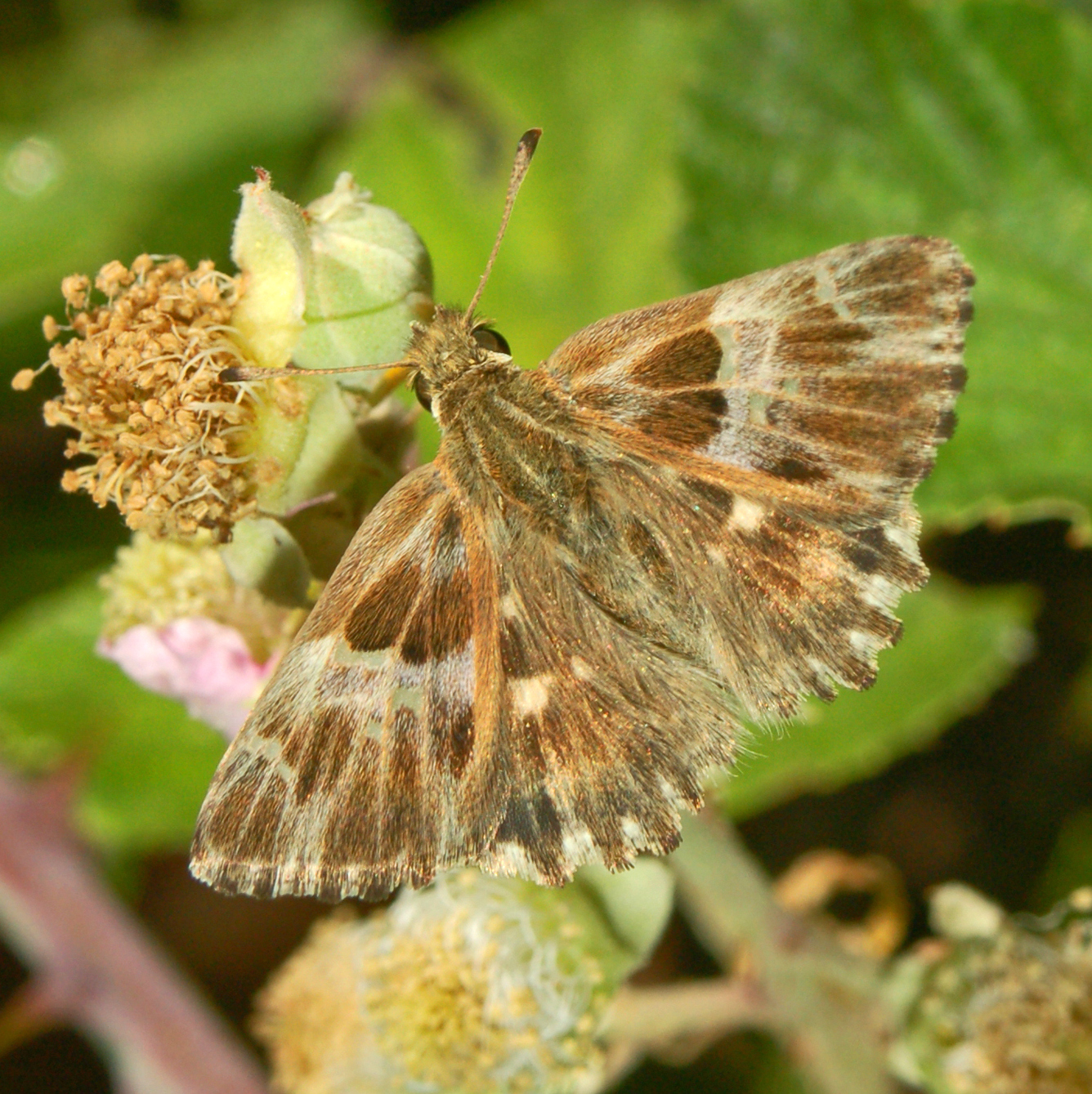
- Adult of Carcharodus flocciferus

Scientific classification
- Kingdom: Animalia
- Phylum: Arthropoda
- Class: Insecta
- Order: Lepidoptera
- Family: Hesperiidae
- Genus: Muschampia
- Species: M. flocciferus

Binomial name
- Muschampia flocciferus (Zeller, 1847)

Synonyms
- Carcharodus flocciferus (Zeller, 1847); Carcharodus alchymillae (Hemming, 1936); Carcharodus gemina Lederer, 1852; Carcharodus imperator Hemming, 1934; Papilio altheae (Hübner, 1803) (non Papilio althaeae Esper, 1783)

= Muschampia floccifera =

Species of butterfly

Muschampia floccifera, the tufted skipper or tufted marbled skipper, is a butterfly of the family Hesperiidae.

== Description ==
Muschampia floccifera has a wingspan of 32–35 millimetres (1.3–1.4 in). It shows a toothed hind wing edge, glass spots on the forewings and grey-brown patterned wing markings. In central Europe Muschampia floccifera can only be confused with Carcharodus alceae. However Muschampia flocciferus differs from this C. alceae by the clearly protruding white spot in the center of the upper side of the hind wing. Further characteristic features are radial white drawing elements on the outer edge of the underside of the hind wing and (in the male) a tuft of hair on the underside of the forewings. This tuft shows often a rusty colour, hence the common name of the species. Antennae show a black spot on the top. Muschampia floccifera is also quite similar in appearance to Muschampia lavatherae and Muschampia orientalis.

The relatively compact and strongly hairy caterpillars are initially gray with a black head. Later they become somewhat brighter. The pupa is bluish with a black longitudinal stripe on the back of the thorax.

== Range ==
The total distribution extends from the Iberian Peninsula to western Mongolia. The northern border in Europe currently runs through France south of Paris and the Vosges through the Alpine foothills (formerly: Rhine-Main area and Danube region) and Austria and further through eastern Poland north to the Baltic States and Russia. In Germany, outside of Bavaria, the species is currently only found in the bordering Baden-Württemberg part of the West Allgäu hill country and the Lake Constance basin. Outside of Europe it occurs in Morocco, in Turkey, in the Middle East and east across the Palearctic to Siberia. It is not present in the United Kingdom.

== Habitat ==
In Bavaria, Muschampia floccifera lives mainly on extensively used, alternately moist purple moor grass dominated meadows with plenty of Betonica officinalis, mostly on fen soils or moorland. In addition to the above-mentioned purple moor grass dominated meadows also relatively dry locations in the Alpine foothills are occupied, such as drained peat soils, transition areas between purple moor grass dominated meadows and poor grassland on moraine or drumlin flanks or knolls, as well as alluvial soils near streams with a tendency to semi-arid grassland.

== Ecology ==
Generally adults are on wing from May to June or July to September in two generations. At higher altitudes there is only one generation from June to August. In central Europe M. floccifera usually shows only one generation, in some years there is a partial second breed. The flight time usually begins in the first decade of June (sometimes as early as the end of May), it usually ends around the middle or end of July, exceptionally imagos still fly at the beginning of August. The population maximum is reached in late June to early July. A partial second generation can occur when caterpillars do not start the diapause as usual in late summer, but develop into pupae. Autumn butterflies were rarely observed in Bavaria from the end of August to the end of September; there are several records of individual butterflies from the Bavarian Lake Constance basin or from the Passau compartment.

Muschampia floccifera is a stationary species with identical imaginal and larval habitats. The imagos eagerly visit flowers, with a clear preference for Betonica officinalis, the main flower of which coincides with the imagos flight period. The butterflies suckle on other plants, especially purple or reddish blooming plants, but much less often. Betonica officinalis is the only caterpillar food plant in Bavaria. In the western Alps, the caterpillars are also feeding on the closely related Stachys pradica (=Stachys hirsuta, Betonica pradica). In other parts of the distribution of this species the larvae were also found feeding on Stachys officinalis, Stachys recta, Stachys alpina, Marrubium (Marrubium vulgare, Marrubium peregrinum), Thymus roegneri and Ballota nigra.

The brown, dome-shaped eggs are usually deposited individually on non-flowering plants on the upper side of leaves close to the ground, preferably on the midrib near the leaf base. Two or more eggs per leaf can also be found in favorable places, which however then usually come from racks of different females. Well-sunlit open areas in the middle of low vegetation are clearly preferred when laying eggs.

The caterpillars spend their entire life in self-made webs of leaves, just like most skipper species. In the wild, caterpillars have so far only been observed eating very rarely outside of their web. When the need for food increases in spring, they change the web every now and then, but usually stay on the same plant. To overwinter, the young caterpillar spins itself into a very small Betonica leaf in the center of the plant. Pupation often takes place in the last caterpillar dwelling. For the detection of Muschampia flocciferus the search for eggs or young caterpillars is well suited, whereby particular attention should be paid to Betonica plants in places with gaps and low-growing vegetation. The larvae overwinter at the base of the plant.

In contrast to most other skipper species, the males of Muschampia flocciferus show pronounced patrolling behavior when looking for a partner. They fly around the habitat persistently, concentrating in particular on the flowers of Betonica officinalis. When a male has found a female, a courtship game begins in which the male strokes the antennae of the female with his forewings and tries to mate with it after a short intermediate flight. If this does not succeed, the behavior described can be repeated over and over again. According to the few observations made so far, mating takes about an hour. Repeated pairings seem to occur, at least one marked female could only be observed when laying eggs and later in the copula.

== Conservation ==
In the last hundred years, a large part of all wet, rough meadows in Central Europe have disappeared due to intensification of use, reforestation or fallow land with subsequent natural reforestation. Locally, populations of Muschampia flocciferus have also been affected by construction projects. Although the habitats in Germany, for example, are now all subject to statutory biotope protection, there are still negative influences such as the lack of buffer zones to the intensively used surrounding area, which often leads to eutrophication and drying out of the core areas. Despite the promotion of extensive habitat management through contractual nature conservation, numerous areas are fallow and lose their suitability for habitat in the course of succession. In addition to neglecting harmful measures such as fertilization, afforestation or drainage, appropriate land management is therefore of central importance for maintaining populations. Since purple moor grass dominated meadows are almost exclusively populated in southern Germany, traditional autumn mowing of these meadow is recommended here from September onwards. The Muschampia flocciferus copes well with this, especially since the leaves of Betonica officinalis close to the ground are only partially covered by the mowing. Mowing should be done as early as June in order to weaken the vitality of the reeds on stretches of purple moor grass dominated meadows that tend to become more reed and mostly rich in nutrients. The freshly sprouting Betonica officinalis is then an ideal egg-laying substrate for Muschampia flocciferus when it is on the wing.

== Taxonomy ==
This species was formerly a member of the genus Carcharodus. Zhang et al. (2020) studied the species genetically (mitochondrial and nuclear DNA) and came to the conclusion that the subgenus Reverdinus with all its species must be separated from the genus Carcharodus and placed as a subgenus of Muschampia. As a result of this genomic research it was transferred to the genus Muschampia along with five other species.

Synonymes:

Carcharodus flocciferus

Papilio altheae Hübner, 1803

Carcharodus gemina Lederer, 1852

Carcharodus imperator Hemming, 1934

Carcharodus alchymillae Hemming, 1936
