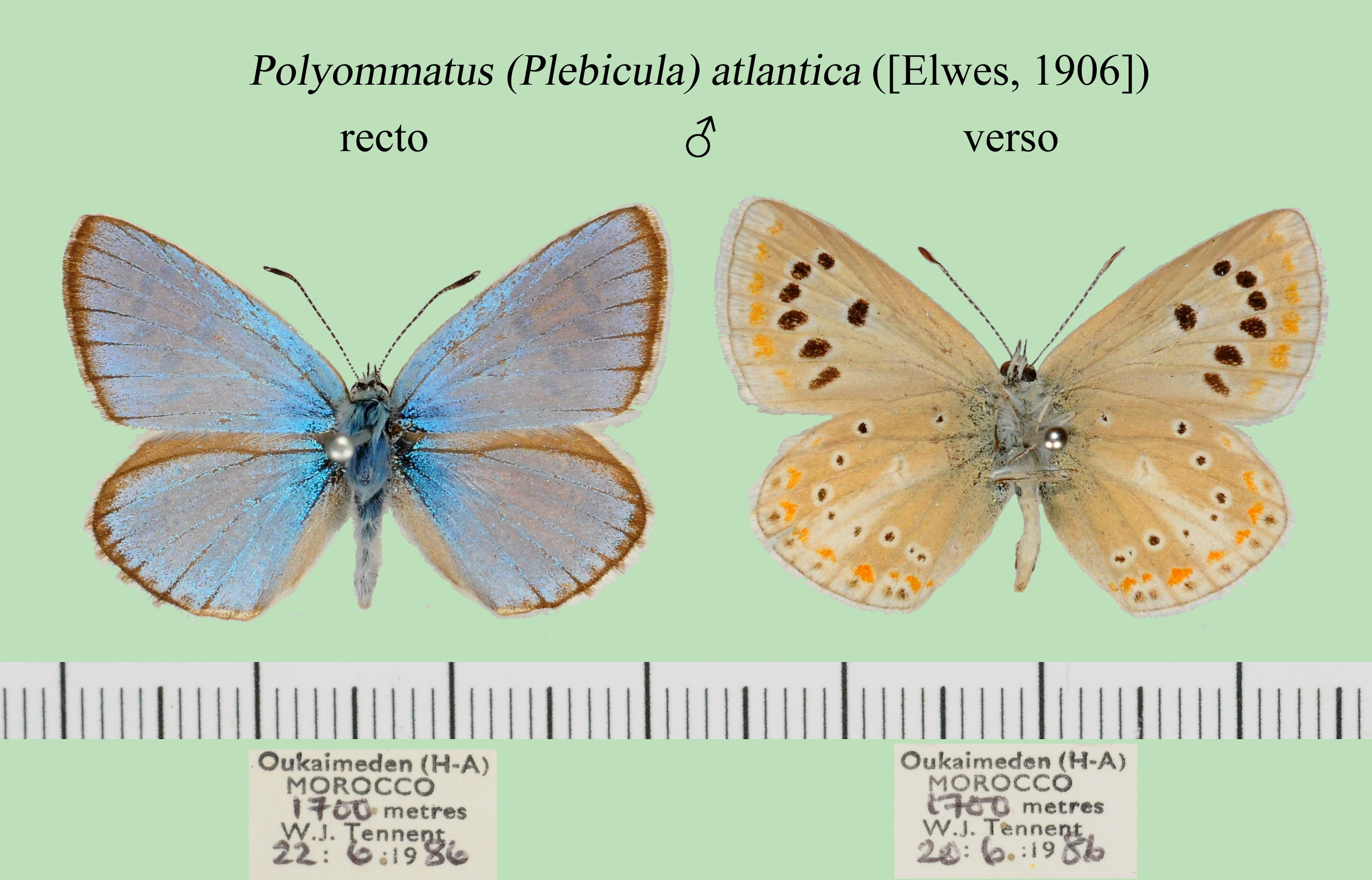

Conservation status
- Near Threatened (IUCN 3.1)

Scientific classification
- Kingdom: Animalia
- Phylum: Arthropoda
- Class: Insecta
- Order: Lepidoptera
- Family: Lycaenidae
- Genus: Polyommatus
- Species: P. atlantica

Binomial name
- Polyommatus atlantica (Elwes, 1905)

Synonyms
- Lycaena hylas var. atlantica Elwes, 1905; Plebicula atlantica; Plebicula atlantica weissi Dujardin, 1977; Plebicula atlantica f. rosea Tennent, 1994

= Polyommatus atlantica =

Species of butterfly

Polyommatus atlantica, the Atlas blue, is a butterfly in the family Lycaenidae. It was described by Henry John Elwes in 1905. It is found in North Africa.

The larvae feed on Anthyllis vulneraria.

It has the highest number of chromosomes of all non-polyploid eukaryotic organisms (2n ≈ 448 to 452).

== Subspecies ==
- Polyommatus atlantica weissi (Morocco: High Atlas)
- Polyommatus atlantica weissi (Dujardin, 1977) (Morocco: Middle Atlas)
- Polyommatus atlantica barraguei Dujardin, 1977 (Algeria: Djurdjura, Aures Mountains)
