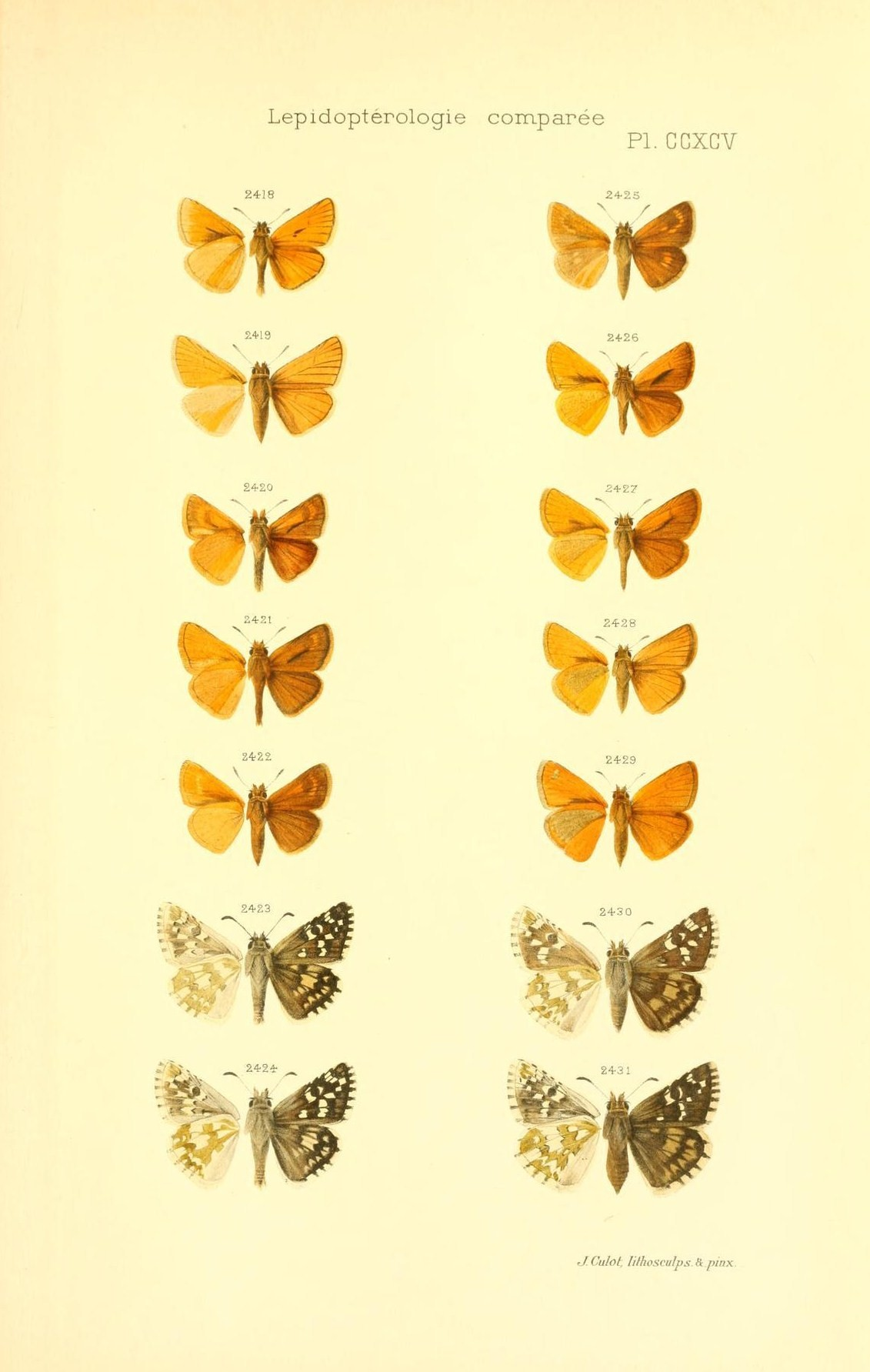
- Thymelicus hamza 2426 male, 2427 male, 2428 female, 2429 female. Figures in Charles Oberthür's Faune des Lepidopteres de la Barbarie. Etudes de Lepidopterologie comparee.

Scientific classification
- Kingdom: Animalia
- Phylum: Arthropoda
- Class: Insecta
- Order: Lepidoptera
- Family: Hesperiidae
- Genus: Thymelicus
- Species: T. hamza

Binomial name
- Thymelicus hamza (Oberthür, 1876)

Synonyms
- Hesperia hamza Oberthür, 1876

= Thymelicus hamza =

Species of butterfly

Thymelicus hamza, the Moroccan small skipper, is a butterfly of the family Hesperiidae. It is found in North Africa and from Anatolia to Turkestan.

The length of the forewings is 11–13 mm. Adults are on wing from May to June in one generation.

== Subspecies ==
- Thymelicus hamza hamza (Morocco, Algeria, Tunisia)
- Thymelicus hamza novissima (Cyrenaica)
