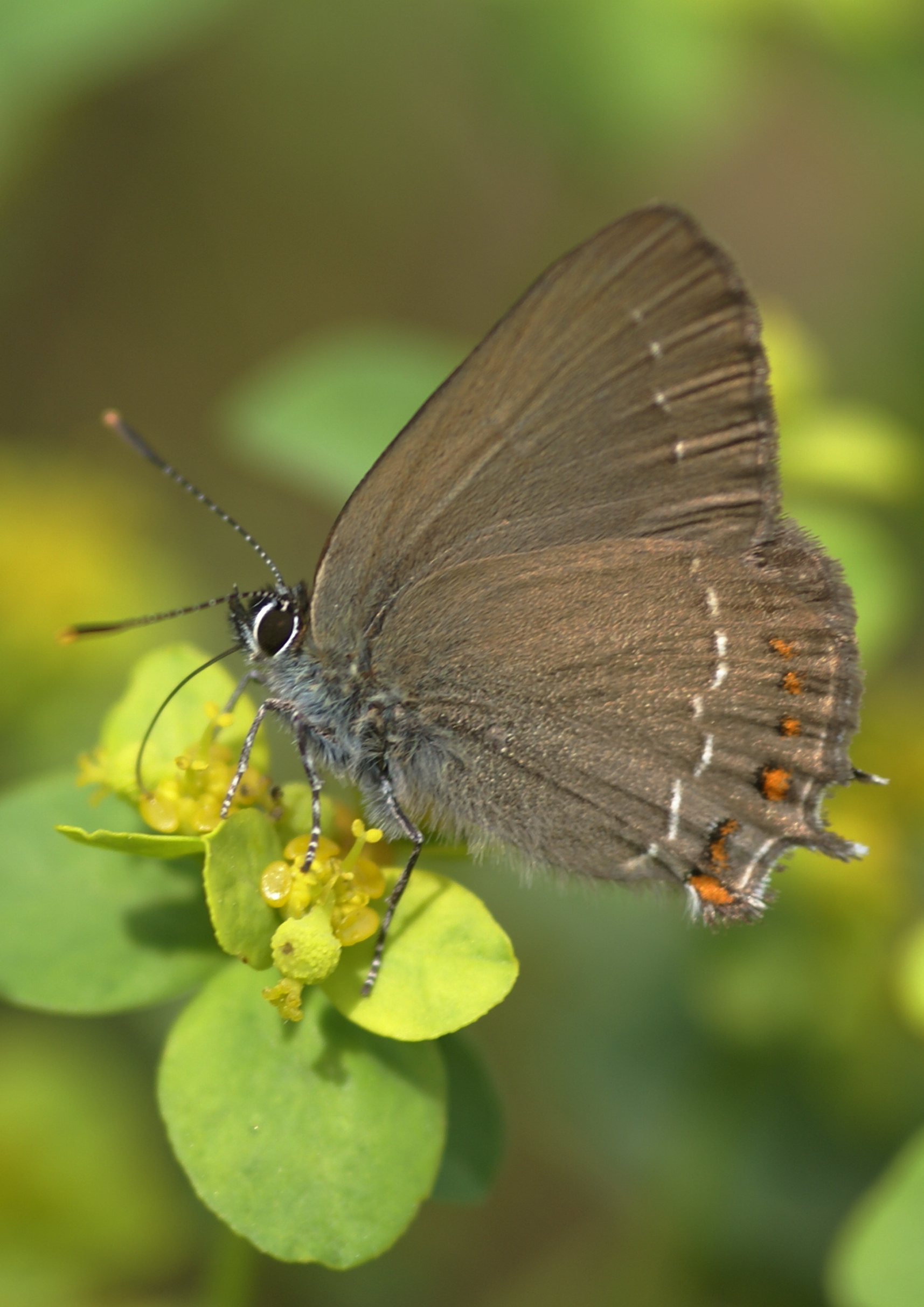

Scientific classification
- Domain: Eukaryota
- Kingdom: Animalia
- Phylum: Arthropoda
- Class: Insecta
- Order: Lepidoptera
- Family: Lycaenidae
- Genus: Satyrium
- Species: S. esculi

Binomial name
- Satyrium esculi (Hübner, 1804)

= Satyrium esculi =

False ilex hairstreak

Species of butterfly

Satyrium esculi, the false ilex hairstreak, is a butterfly in the family Lycaenidae. The species was first described by Jacob Hübner in 1804.

== Distribution ==
The false ilex hairstreak lives throughout North Africa (Morocco to Tunisia) and the Iberian Peninsula (with the exception of Galicia, where its food plants are absent). It is also found on the Balearic Islands and in southern France from the Pyrenees to the Cote d'Azur, extending into Liguria in Italy.

== Description in Seitz ==
ab. esculi Hbn.[ of Satyrium ilicis ] (73b) (Fig. 559/560) is a small form with rather long tail and unicolorous upperside (there being only a small red spot at the anal angle); on the underside the row of bars of the forewmg is indistinct and the brownish yellow submarginal spots of the hindwing are but slightly prominent; Portugal, Spain and South France; according to the size of the discal patch of the forewing some transitional specimens have been provided with names (ilicioides, macidata), such as probably occur wherever ilicis is found. The yellow patch is apparently most strongly developed in North Africa.

== Food plants ==
The larvae feed on sclerophyllous oaks of woodland and maquis: holm oak and kermes oak.

== See also ==
- Satyrium ilicis, the ilex hairstreak
