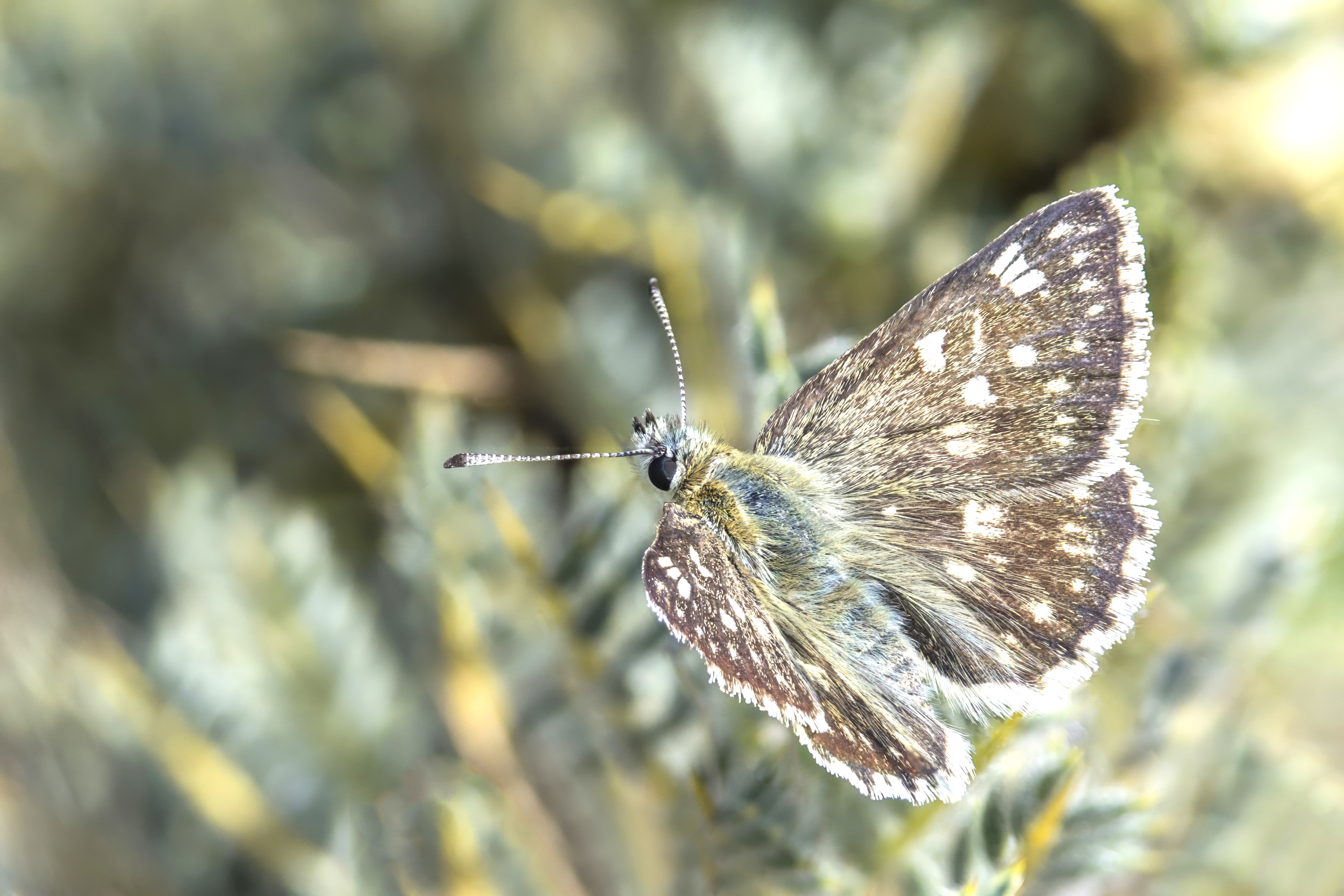
- in Turkey

Scientific classification
- Kingdom: Animalia
- Phylum: Arthropoda
- Class: Insecta
- Order: Lepidoptera
- Family: Hesperiidae
- Genus: Muschampia
- Species: M. tessellum

Binomial name
- Muschampia tessellum (Hübner, 1803)

Synonyms
- Papilio tessellum Hübner, [1800-1803]; Muschampia hibisci Boeber, 1812; Muschampia mazzola Ochsenheimer, 1816; Syrichtus tessellum

= Muschampia tessellum =

Species of butterfly

Muschampia tessellum, the tessellated skipper, is a butterfly of the family Hesperiidae. It is found from the southern Balkan Peninsula (North Macedonia, Bulgaria, Greece and the European part of Turkey) through Ukraine, southern Russia (north to the Moscow region) and Asia Minor, southern Siberia, Mongolia, east to the Amur region.

The length of the forewings is 13–16 mm, the wingspan is 32–36 mm. The upper wings are brown with numerous clear white spots on both fore- and hindwings. The underside of the wings are olive green with paler spots. Adults are on wing from the end of May to mid-August in Europe.

== Description in Seitz ==
H. tessellum Hbn. (85 e, f). Hindwing beneath grey-green or light olive, with three bands of light spots; the basal band, consisting of two spots, terminates in the cell: the median band very broad, reaching from veins 4 to 8; the white spot between veins 3 and 4 projects strongly from the band. Fore wing with four apical spots. From Russia throughout Anterior Asia to West China, Tibet and the Tian-shan. — The form nigricans form, nov., from Juldus, of which I have a female, has the upperside of the wings black; the median band of the fore-wing consists of only two spots, the lunule at the apex of the cell is absent, so that the disc bears only three white dots and a diffuse smear in interspace 2. The dots of the hindwing are reduced, obsolescent. The underside of both wings almost normal, but the centre of the forewing is nearly black, the white spots of the hindwing on the contrary broader and all very sharply developed. — nomas Led.[now subsp.Syrichtus tessellum ssp. nomas Lederer, 1855] (85 f) resembles name-typical specimens above; the underside of the hindwing, however, is uniformly white, without markings. South Russia, Asia Minor, Altai and West China. .

== Biology ==
In the Altai Mountains, adults are on wing from May to July.

The larvae feed on Phlomis species, including Phlomis samia in Greece and Phlomis tuberosa in the southern Ural.

== Subspecies ==
- Muschampia tessellum tessellum
- Muschampia tessellum cribrelloidesWarren, 1926
- Muschampia tessellum nigricans Mabille, 1908
- Muschampia tessellum dilutior Rühl, 1895.

== Sources ==
- Whalley, Paul - Mitchell Beazley Guide to Butterflies (1981, reprinted 1992) ISBN 0-85533-348-0
