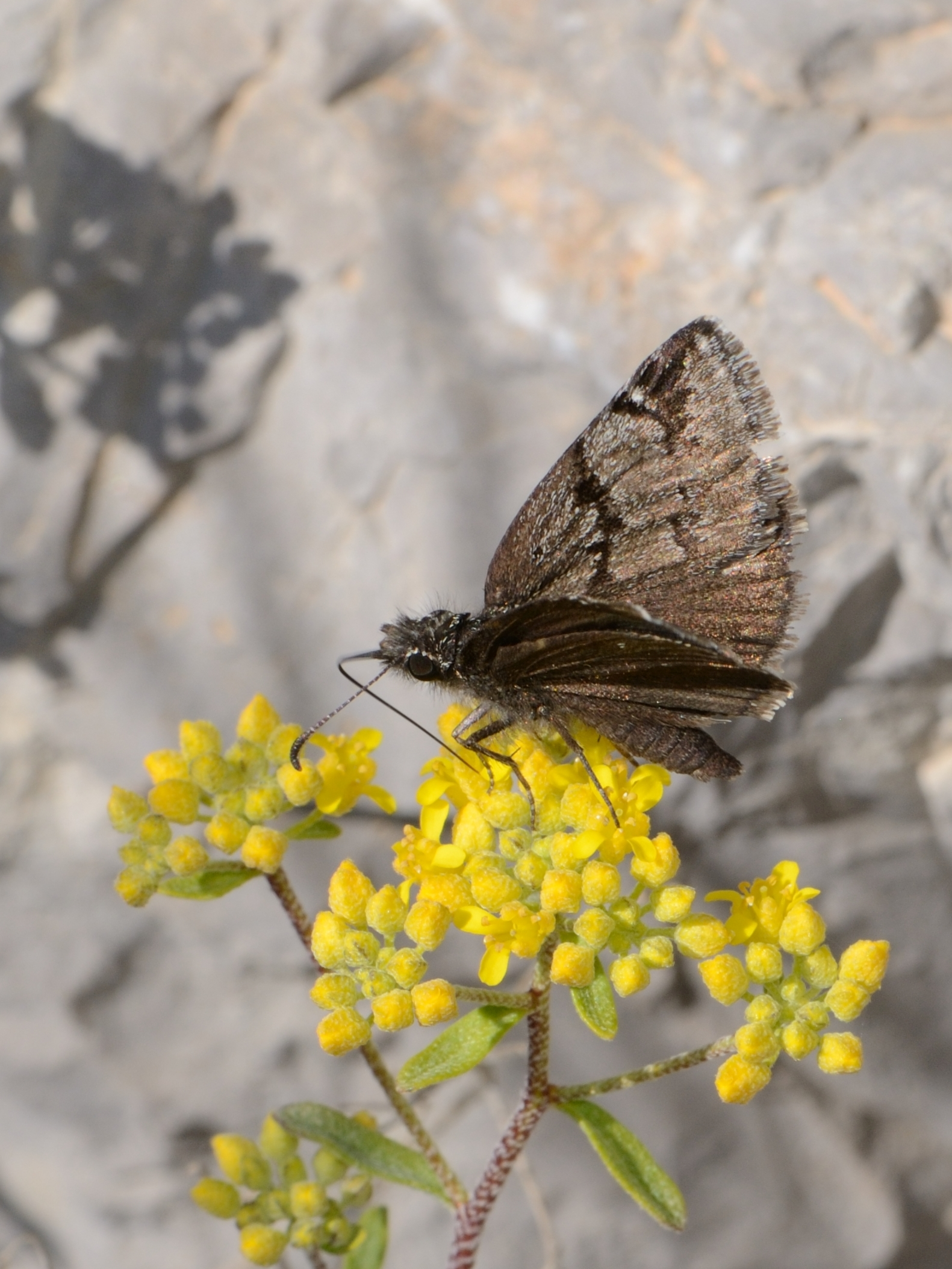

Scientific classification
- Domain: Eukaryota
- Kingdom: Animalia
- Phylum: Arthropoda
- Class: Insecta
- Order: Lepidoptera
- Family: Hesperiidae
- Genus: Erynnis
- Species: E. marloyi

Binomial name
- Erynnis marloyi Boisduval, 1834

Synonyms
- Thanaos marloyi; Thanaos sericea; Thanaos rustan

= Erynnis marloyi =

Species of butterfly

Erynnis marloyi, commonly known as the inky skipper, is a species of butterfly in the family Hesperiidae. It is found in south-eastern Europe (Greece and the Balkans) across Asia Minor to Syria, Turkey, Lebanon, southern Iran and Chitral, Pakistan.

The wingspan is 14–15 mm for males and 15–16 mm for females.

== Description in Seitz ==
Th. marloyi Bdv. (= sericea Frr., rustan Koll.) (86 d). Wings black; the forewing with two oblique black bands; fringes hardly lighter than the ground-colour. The light dots in interspaces 7 and 8 very distinctly white, especially on the underside, where there are three spots, one of them being vitreous. South Europe, Asia Minor, Syria and Persia.

== Biology ==
The habitat is dry slopes, in ravines on carbonate rocks. It is found in mountains from 600 to 2000 meters and above.

Adults are on wing from May to June.

The larvae feed on Rosaceae species.
