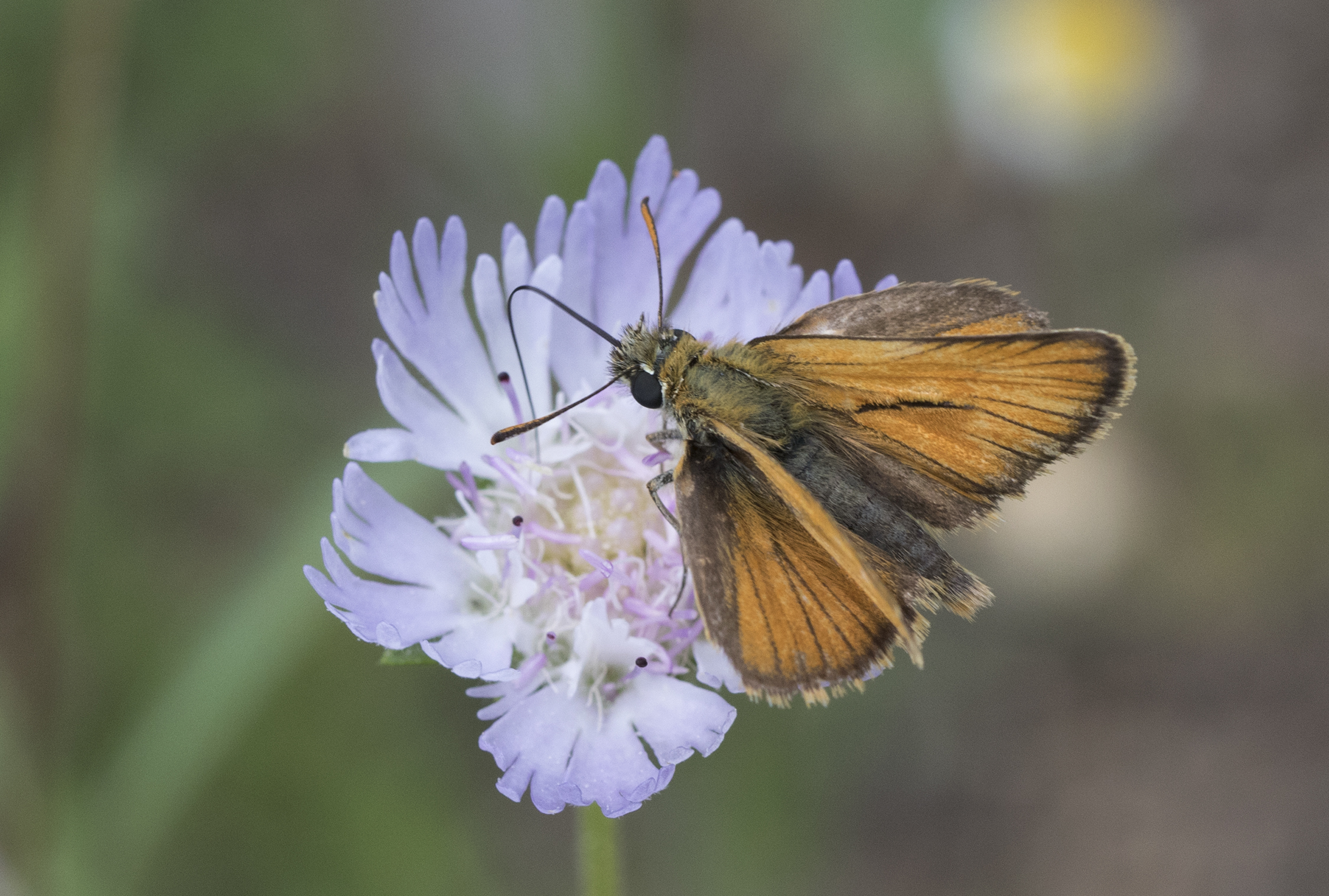

Scientific classification
- Kingdom: Animalia
- Phylum: Arthropoda
- Clade: Pancrustacea
- Class: Insecta
- Order: Lepidoptera
- Family: Hesperiidae
- Genus: Thymelicus
- Species: T. hyrax

Binomial name
- Thymelicus hyrax (Lederer, 1861)

Synonyms
- Hesperia hyrax Lederer, 1861; Adopaea pfeifferi Bytinsky-Salz & Brandt, 1937

= Thymelicus hyrax =

Levantine skipper

Species of butterfly

Thymelicus hyrax, the Levantine skipper, is a butterfly in family Hesperiidae that lives in Iran, Syria, Israel, Jordan, Armenia, Azerbaijan, the Northwest Caucasus, Turkey, Greece, Lesbos, Chios, Samos and Rhodes

== Life cycle ==
The species predominantly inhabits dry areas, otherwise open woodlands, occupying an elevation range of up to 2000 metres above sea level. The larval host plant is probably Achnatherum bromoides. Butterflies take wing from June till August in a single generation.
