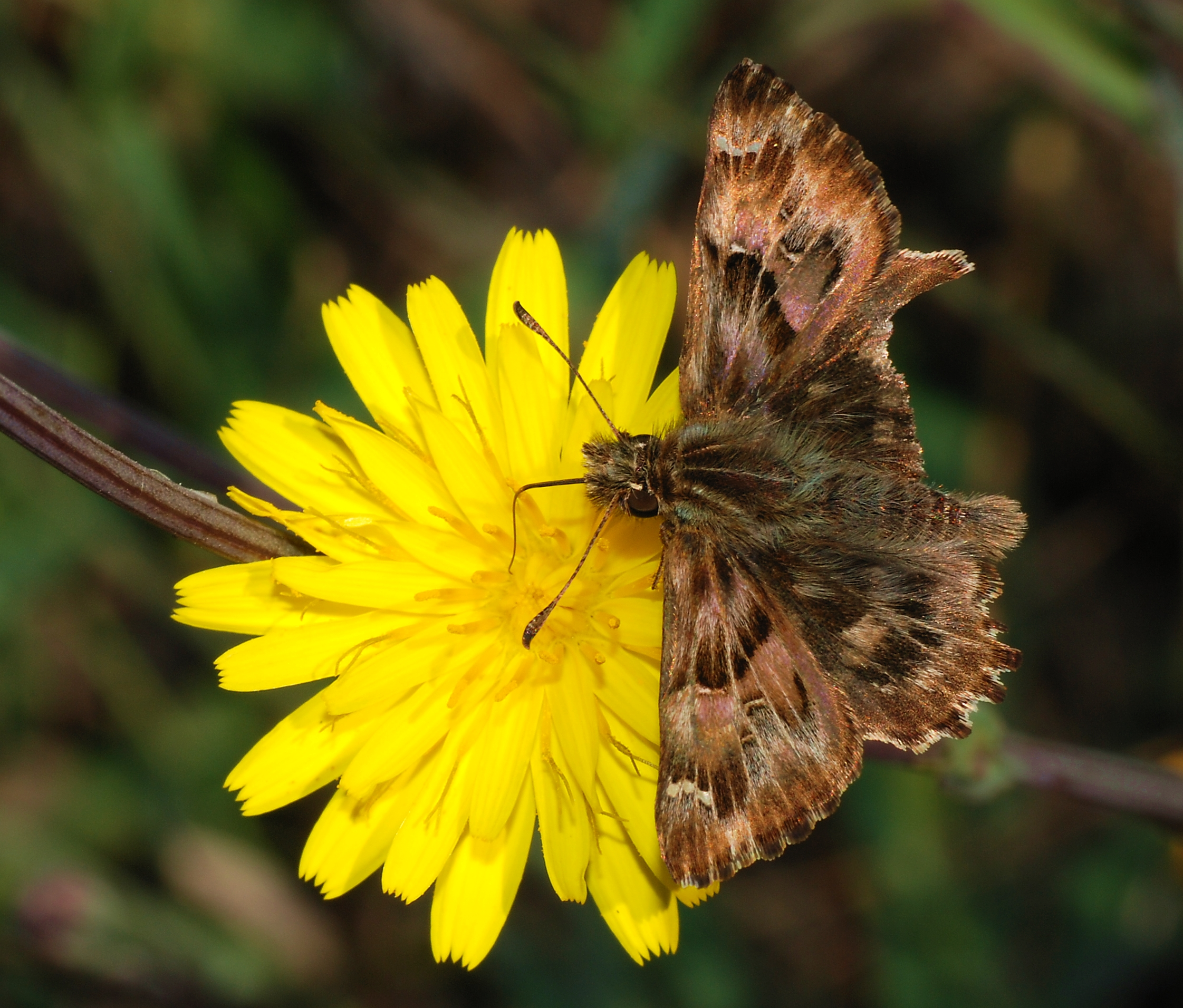

Scientific classification
- Domain: Eukaryota
- Kingdom: Animalia
- Phylum: Arthropoda
- Class: Insecta
- Order: Lepidoptera
- Family: Hesperiidae
- Genus: Carcharodus
- Species: C. tripolinus

Binomial name
- Carcharodus tripolinus (Verity, 1925)

Synonyms
- Carcharodus tripolina; Erynnis alceae tripolina Verity, 1925

= Carcharodus tripolinus =

Species of butterfly

Carcharodus tripolinus, the false mallow skipper, is a species of butterfly in the family Hesperiidae. It is found along a narrow strip along the coast of southern Portugal and Spain and across North Africa.

The wingspan is 26–34 mm. Adults are on wing from March to September.

The larvae feed on Malva sylvestris. They have also been recorded on Althaea in Egypt.
