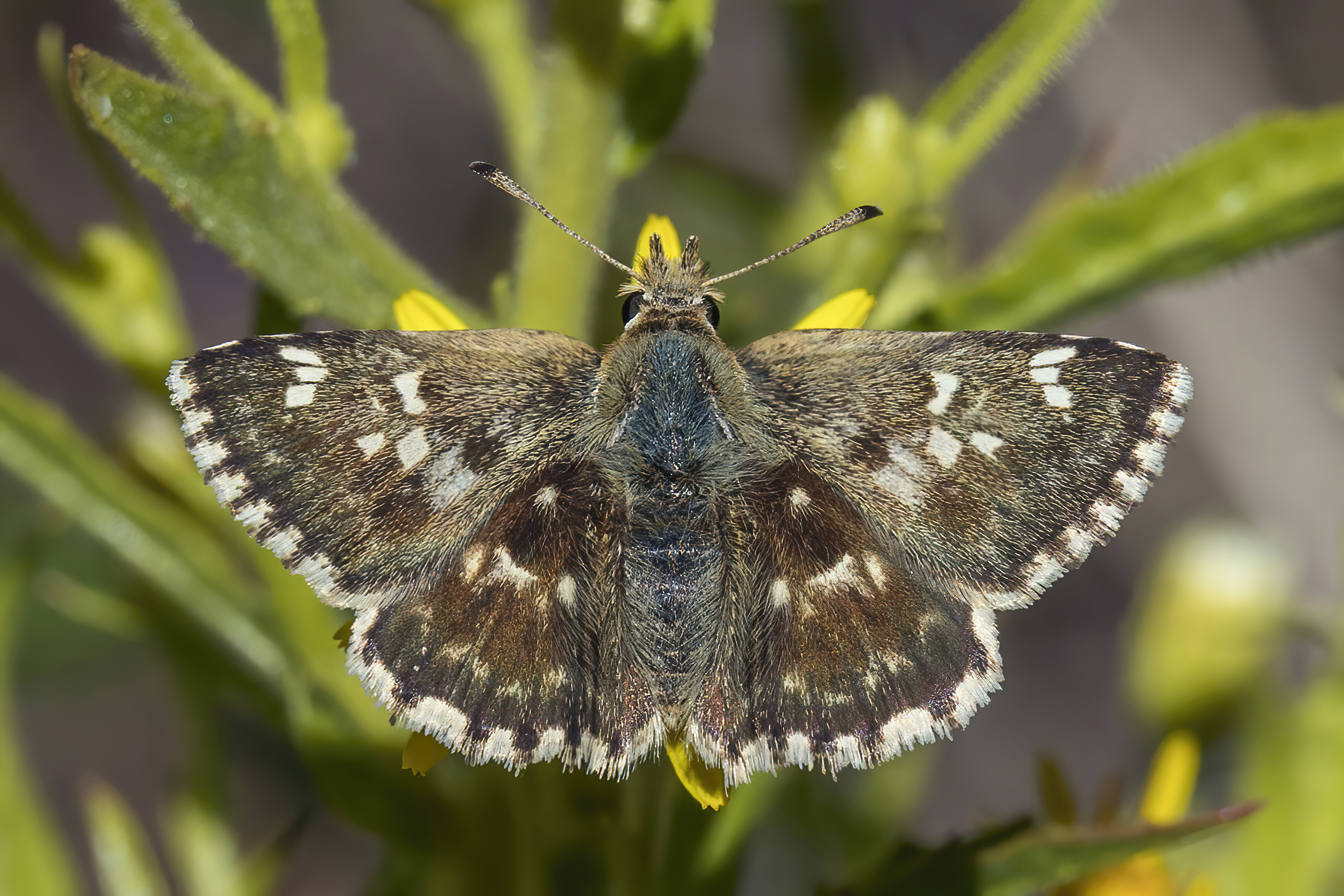
- in Corfu, Greece

Scientific classification
- Domain: Eukaryota
- Kingdom: Animalia
- Phylum: Arthropoda
- Class: Insecta
- Order: Lepidoptera
- Family: Hesperiidae
- Genus: Muschampia
- Species: M. proto

Binomial name
- Muschampia proto (Ochsenheimer, 1808)

= Muschampia proto =

Species of butterfly

Muschampia proto, the sage skipper, is a butterfly of the family Hesperiidae. It is found in Morocco, Algeria, the Iberian Peninsula and southern France.

== Description ==
The length of the forewings is 14–15 mm, although there are specimens with a forewing length of 15–17 mm in Morocco. This is a rather variable species but usually has a well-marked central spot on the forewing to distinguish it from similar species.

== Description in Seitz ==
H. proto Esp. (85 d). The interspace between veins 7 and 8 on the underside of the hindwing bears only a single spot in the centre, namely the one which is the first spot of the median band; in the marginal area a second spot, which may be united with the fringes. Upperside of the wings grey-brown; the spots but little prominent, yellowish. Hindwing beneath yellowish grey or pale reddish; beyond the median band follows a brown postmedian one, the whole marginal area beyond it being of the same colour as the ground. In each marginal cellule a dark dot, above which there is a light arched smear. South Europe, Syria, Armenia, Turkestan. — The form mohammed Oberth.[now species Syrichtus mohammed Oberthür, 1887 (85 e) differs in the large white spots of the underside of both wings, in the very distinct subterminal row of dots and in the hindwing beneath being more variegated with white. Algeria.

== Biology ==
Adults are on wing in April, May or even later in one generation.

The larvae feed on Phlomis species.

== Sources ==
- Whalley, Paul - Mitchell Beazley Guide to Butterflies (1981, reprinted 1992) ISBN 0-85533-348-0
