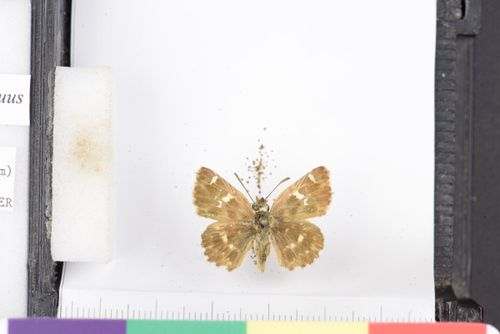

Scientific classification
- Kingdom: Animalia
- Phylum: Arthropoda
- Class: Insecta
- Order: Lepidoptera
- Family: Hesperiidae
- Tribe: Carcharodini
- Subtribe: Carcharodina
- Genus: Muschampia
- Species: M. stauderi

Binomial name
- Muschampia stauderi (Reverdin, 1913)

Synonyms
- Carcharodus stauderi Reverdin, 1913; Erynnis stauderi f. fulvissima Verity, 1925; Erynnis stauderi f. obscura Verity, 1925; Carcharodus stauderi romeii Rothschild, 1933; Reverdinus stauderi f. rungsi Picard, 1950

= Muschampia stauderi =

Species of butterfly

Muschampia stauderi, Stauder's skipper, is a butterfly of the family Hesperiidae. The species is distributed from Morocco to Asia Minor and northern Iran, including Transcaucasia.

== Description ==
The wingspan is 28–30 mm. .M. stauderi closely resembles other Muschampia but is separable by features of the underside hindwing.

== Biology ==
The species inhabits mostly mountain steppe areas, dominated by legume plants and grasses. The elevation range of the species distribution is from 1800 to 2200 metres above sea level. Most probably there are two generations per year, when the first generation flies during July (sometimes starting in late June) and the second generation in on wing from late September till mid-October.

Larval host plants are Ballota foetida, Marrubium vulgare, Phlomis aurea, and Phlomis floccosa.

This species was formerly a member of the genus Carcharodus, but was transferred to Muschampia as a result of genomic research published in 2020.

== Subspecies ==
- Muschampia stauderi stauderi
- Muschampia stauderi ambigua Verity, 1925 (Nakhichevan)
