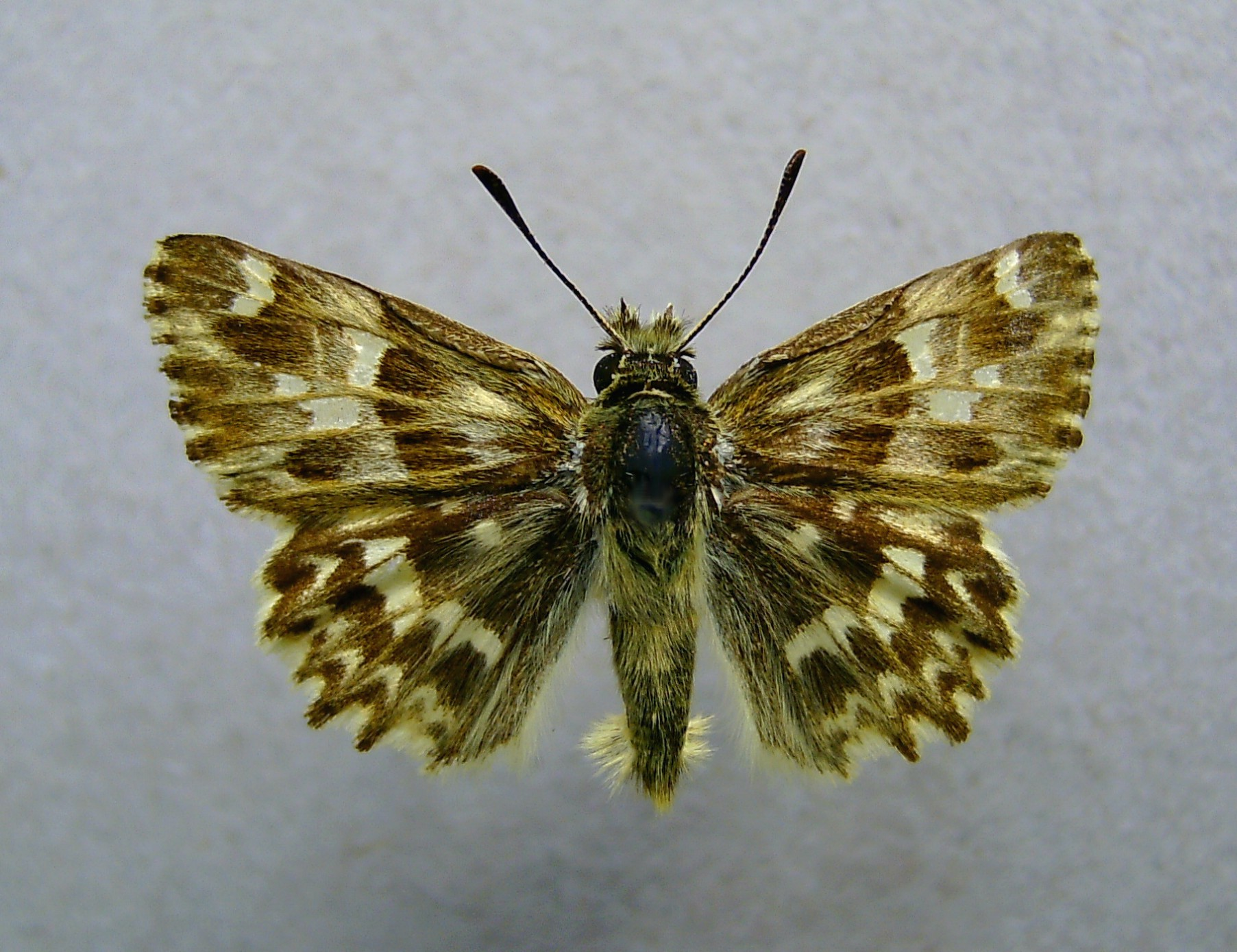

Scientific classification
- Kingdom: Animalia
- Phylum: Arthropoda
- Class: Insecta
- Order: Lepidoptera
- Family: Hesperiidae
- Genus: Muschampia
- Species: M. lavatherae

Binomial name
- Muschampia lavatherae (Esper, 1783)

Synonyms
- Carcharodus lavatherae Esper, 1783

= Muschampia lavatherae =

Species of butterfly

Muschampia lavatherae, the marbled skipper, is a butterfly of the family Hesperiidae. It is found from the Rhine Rift Valley in central Germany up to North Africa and from south-eastern France up to Anatolia.

The wingspan is 28–34 mm.

== Description in Seitz ==
C. lavatherae Esp. (85 a). Yellowish grey or ash-colour; hindwing darker, with two rows of distinct, almost white, spots. Underside of hindwing with two small grey bands in the centre. — Southern Europe, North Africa, Syria, Armenia.

== Biology ==
The butterfly gives one generation per year and flies from May to July depending on the location.

The larvae feed on Stachys recta and Sideritis scordioides in Southern Europe.

This species was formerly a member of the genus Carcharodus. As a result of genomic research published in 2020, it was transferred to the genus Muschampia.
