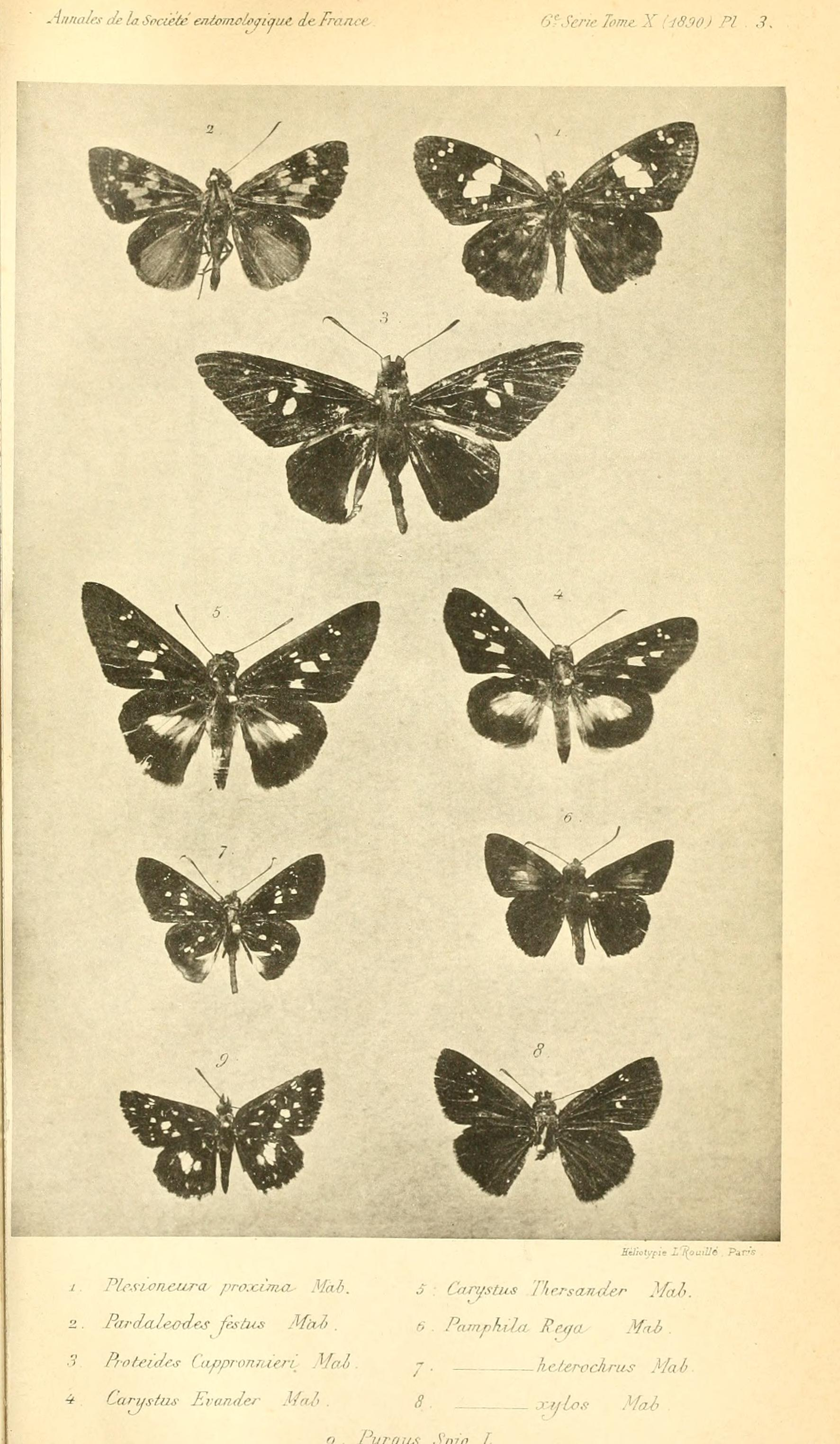

Scientific classification
- Kingdom: Animalia
- Phylum: Arthropoda
- Class: Insecta
- Order: Lepidoptera
- Family: Hesperiidae
- Genus: Spialia
- Species: S. spio

Binomial name
- Spialia spio (Linnaeus, 1764)

Synonyms
- Papilio spio Linnaeus, 1764; Syrichtus spio; Papilio vindex Stoll, 1781

= Spialia spio =

Species of butterfly

Spialia spio, the mountain sandman or Spio grizzled skipper, is a butterfly of the family Hesperiidae. It is found in tropical Africa and south-western Arabia. It is found in eastern South Africa.

The wingspan is 22–29 mm for males and 28–31 mm for females. Adults are on wing year-round in warmer areas. In South Africa it is more common in warmer months. In cooler areas adults are on wing from August to April.

The larvae feed on Lavatera arborea, Hibiscus (including Hibiscus aethiopicus, Hibiscus gossypinus and Hibiscus pusillus), Sida, Pavonia (including Pavonia burchellii, Pavonia macrophylla and Pavonia columella), Triumfetta and Hermannia species (including Hermannia diffusa, Hermannia incana, Hermannia comosa, Hermannia coccocarpa, Hermannia candicans, Hermannia pilosula, Hermannia pallius, Hermannia pollens and Hermannia cuneifolia).
