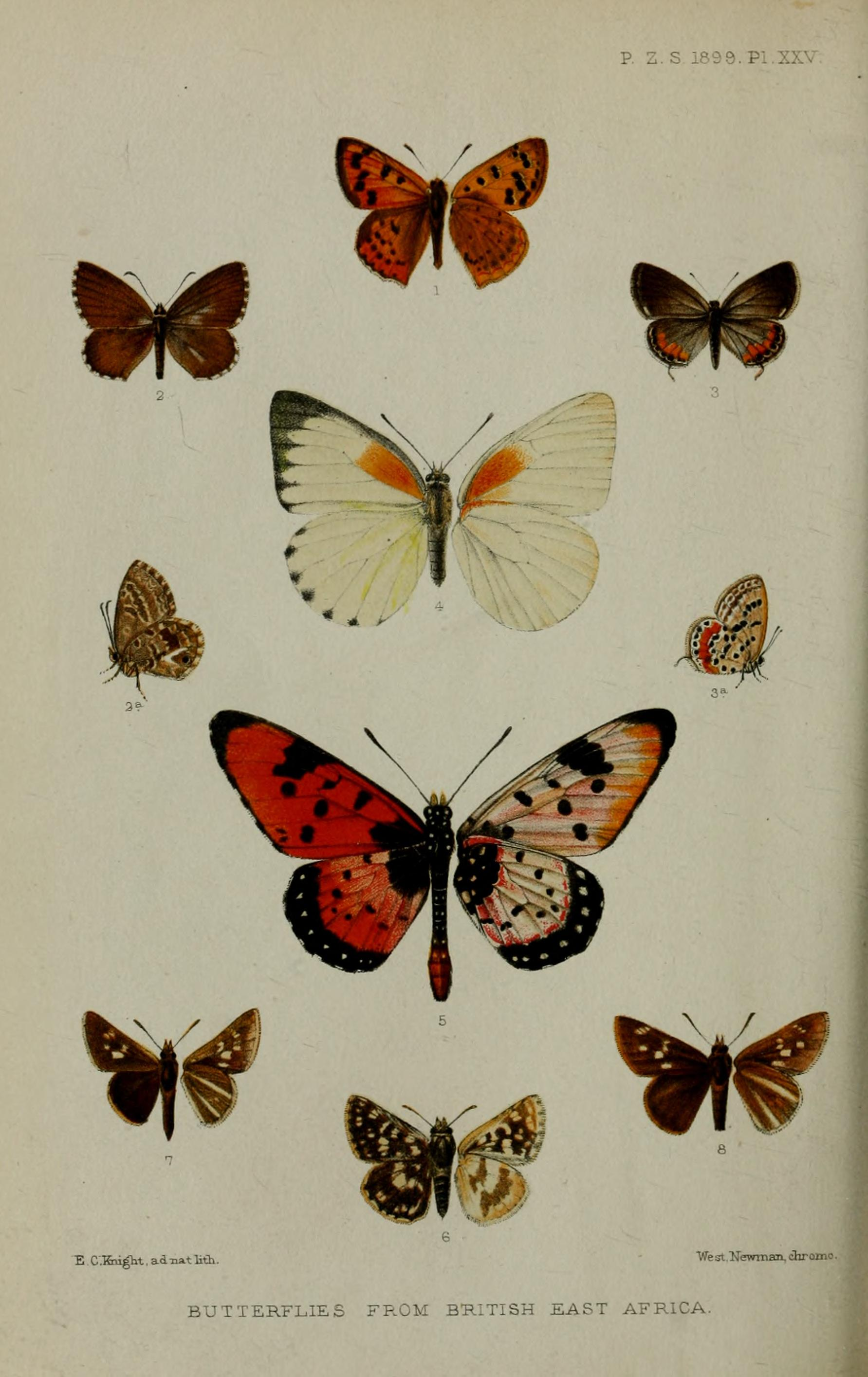
- Female, figure 6

Scientific classification
- Domain: Eukaryota
- Kingdom: Animalia
- Phylum: Arthropoda
- Class: Insecta
- Order: Lepidoptera
- Family: Hesperiidae
- Genus: Spialia
- Species: S. diomus

Binomial name
- Spialia diomus (Höpffer, 1855)

Synonyms
- Pyrgus diomus Hopffer, 1855; Syrichtus diomus; Syrichtus ferax Wallengren, 1863; Pyrgus machacoana Butler, 1899; Pyrgus abscondita Plötz, 1884; Syrichthus lacreuzei Oberthür, 1912

= Spialia diomus =

Species of butterfly

Spialia diomus, the common sandman or Diomus grizzled skipper, is a butterfly of the family Hesperiidae. It is found in tropical Africa and south-western Arabia.

The wingspan is 27–31 mm for males and 29–33 mm for females. Adults are on wing year-round in warmer areas. In South Africa it is more common in warmer months. In cooler areas adults are on wing from August to April.

The larvae feed on Hibiscus (including Hibiscus aethiopicus), Sida, Pavonia (including Pavonia burchellii), Waltheria and Hermannia species (including Hermannia diffusa, Hermannia incana, Hermannia comosa, Hermannia depressa and Hermannia cuneifolia).

== Subspecies ==
- Spialia diomus diomus (Senegal, Gambia, Guinea, Liberia, Ivory Coast, Ghana, Nigeria, Kenya, Yemen)
- Spialia diomus ferax (Wallengren, 1863) (Zambia, Mozambique, Zimbabwe, Botswana, Namibia, South Africa, Eswatini, Lesotho)
