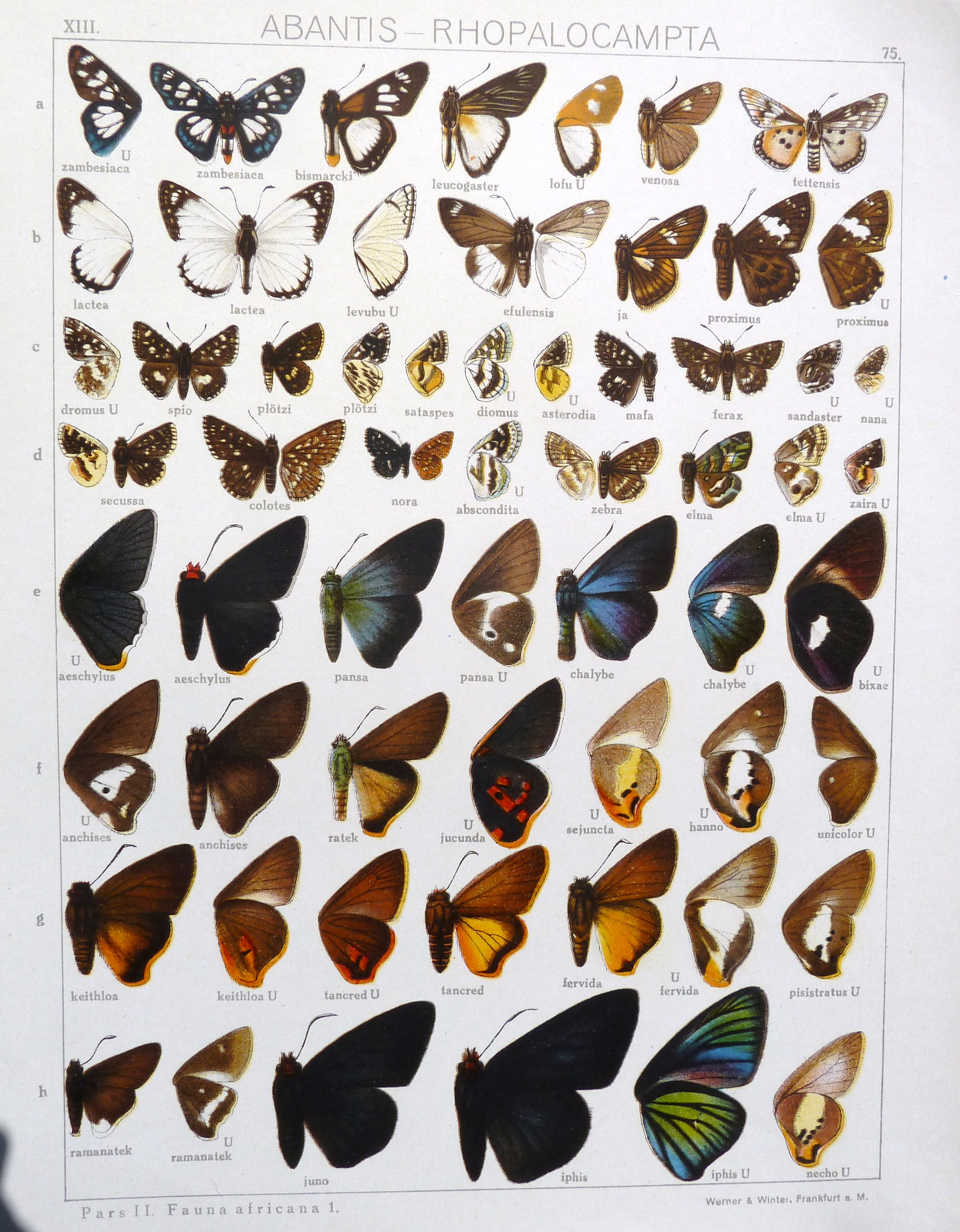

Scientific classification
- Kingdom: Animalia
- Phylum: Arthropoda
- Clade: Pancrustacea
- Class: Insecta
- Order: Lepidoptera
- Family: Hesperiidae
- Genus: Spialia
- Species: S. sataspes

Binomial name
- Spialia sataspes (Trimen, 1864)

Synonyms
- Pyrgus sataspes Trimen, 1864; Syrichtus sataspes

= Spialia sataspes =

Species of butterfly

Spialia sataspes, the Boland sandman, is a butterfly of the family Hesperiidae. It is found in South Africa, in fynbos in the western Cape and along the mountain chains of the northern Cape and along the coast to Port Elizabeth in the eastern Cape and inland to Bedford and Grahamstown.

The wingspan is 21–26 mm for males and 24–28 mm for females. There is one extended generation per year with peaks from November to January.

The larvae feed on Hermannia species, Pavonia burchelli and Hebiscus aethiopicus.
