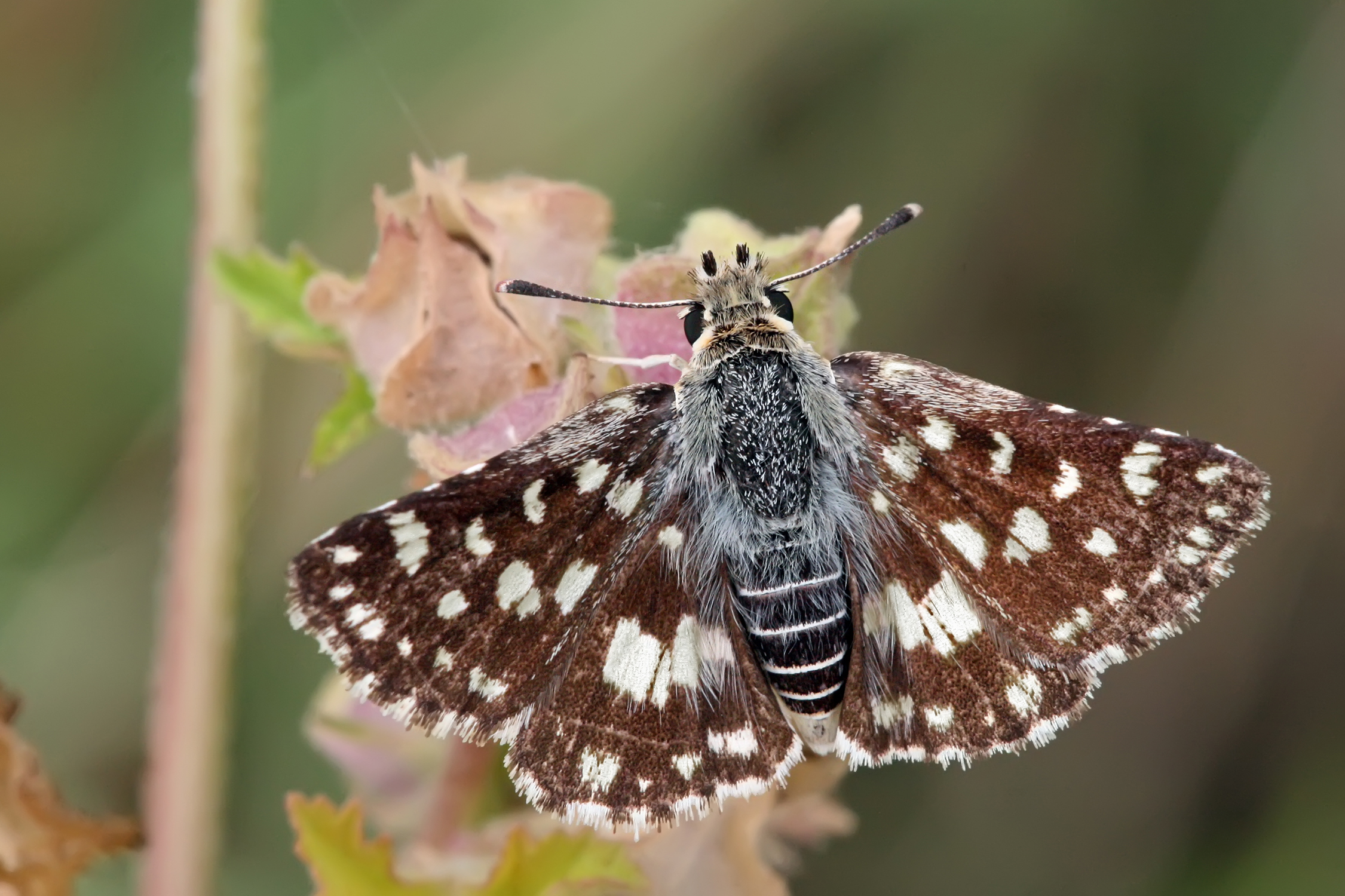
- In Ngorongoro Crater, Tanzania

Scientific classification
- Domain: Eukaryota
- Kingdom: Animalia
- Phylum: Arthropoda
- Class: Insecta
- Order: Lepidoptera
- Family: Hesperiidae
- Genus: Spialia
- Species: S. mafa

Binomial name
- Spialia mafa (Trimen, 1870)

Synonyms
- Pyrgus mafa Trimen, 1870; Hesperia oberthuri Aurivillius, 1925; Spialia aurivillii Shepard, 1935

= Spialia mafa =

Mafa sandman

Species of butterfly

Spialia mafa, the Mafa grizzled skipper or Mafa sandman, is a butterfly of the family Hesperiidae. It is found in south-western Africa, in KwaZulu-Natal, Botswana, Zimbabwe and from the Cape in South Africa to Sudan and southern Arabia.

These skippers are dark brown with white spots and both sides of the wings.

Wingspan is from 22–26 mm.

Flight period is year-round but peaks from September to April.

The larvae feed on Hermannia, Pavonia and Hibiscus species (including Hibiscus aethiopicus).

== Subspecies ==
- Spialia mafa mafa (southern Democratic Republic of the Congo, Malawi, southern and south-eastern Zambia, Mozambique, Zimbabwe, Botswana, central and northern Namibia, South Africa, Eswatini, Lesotho)
- Spialia mafa higginsi Evans, 1937 (Ethiopia, Somalia, Kenya, Tanzania, south-western Saudi Arabia, Yemen, Oman)
