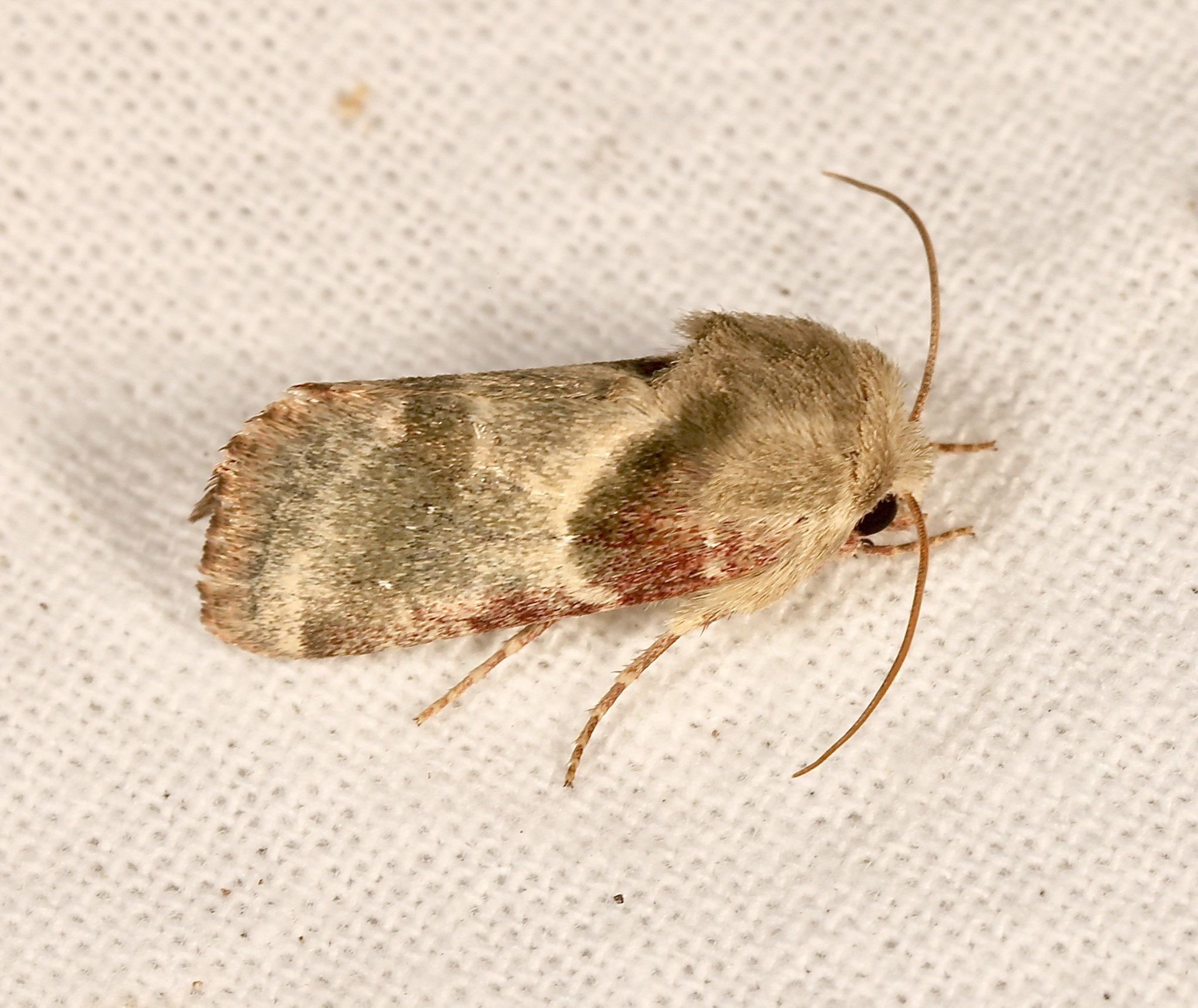

Scientific classification
- Kingdom: Animalia
- Phylum: Arthropoda
- Clade: Pancrustacea
- Class: Insecta
- Order: Lepidoptera
- Superfamily: Noctuoidea
- Family: Noctuidae
- Genus: Schinia
- Species: S. olivacea

Binomial name
- Schinia olivacea Smith, 1906

= Schinia olivacea =

Species of moth

Schinia olivacea is a species of moth in the family Noctuidae. It is found in North America, including Texas.

The wingspan is 21–24 mm.

Larvae have been recorded on Hermannia texana and Sphaeralcea lindheimeri.
