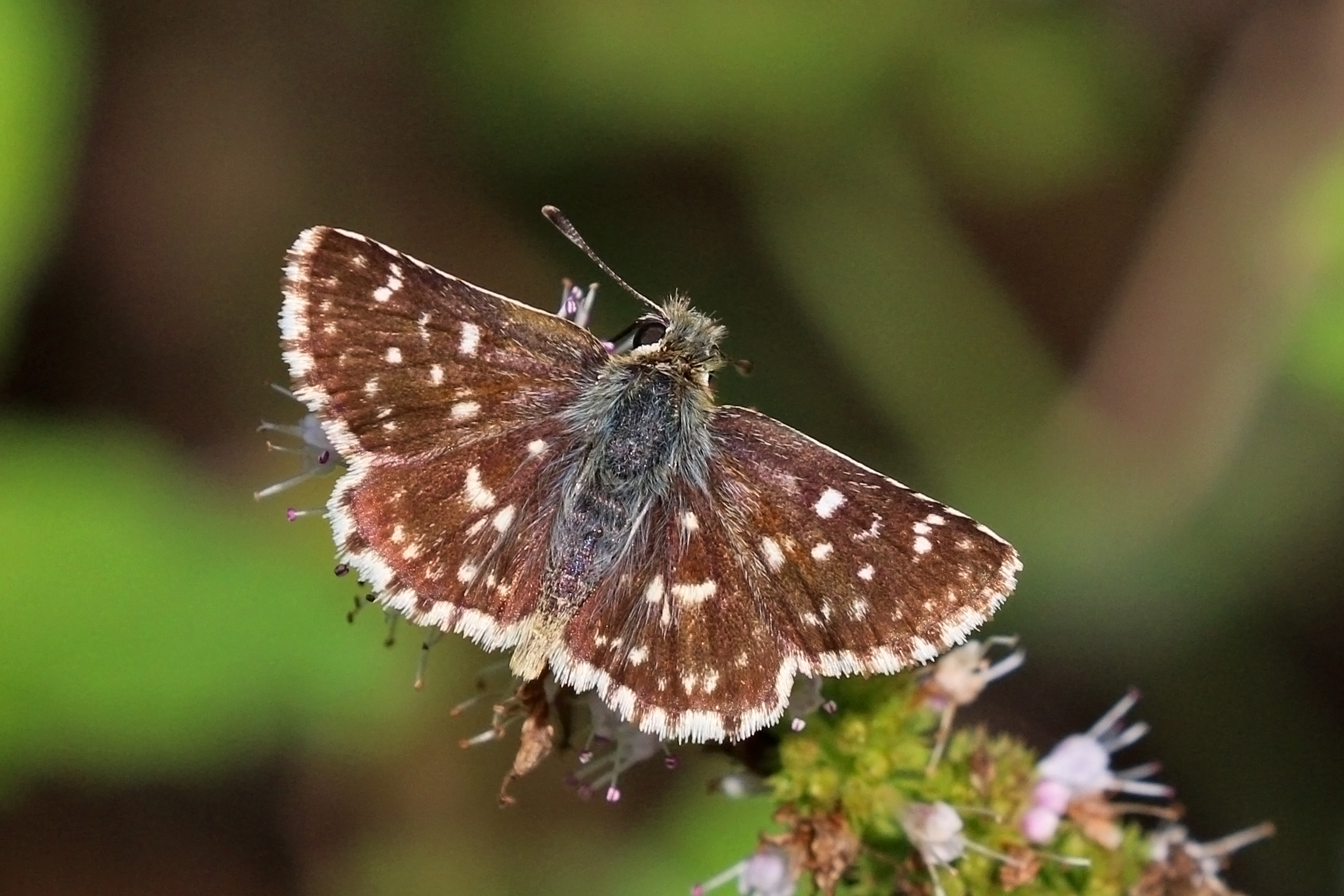
- In Portugal
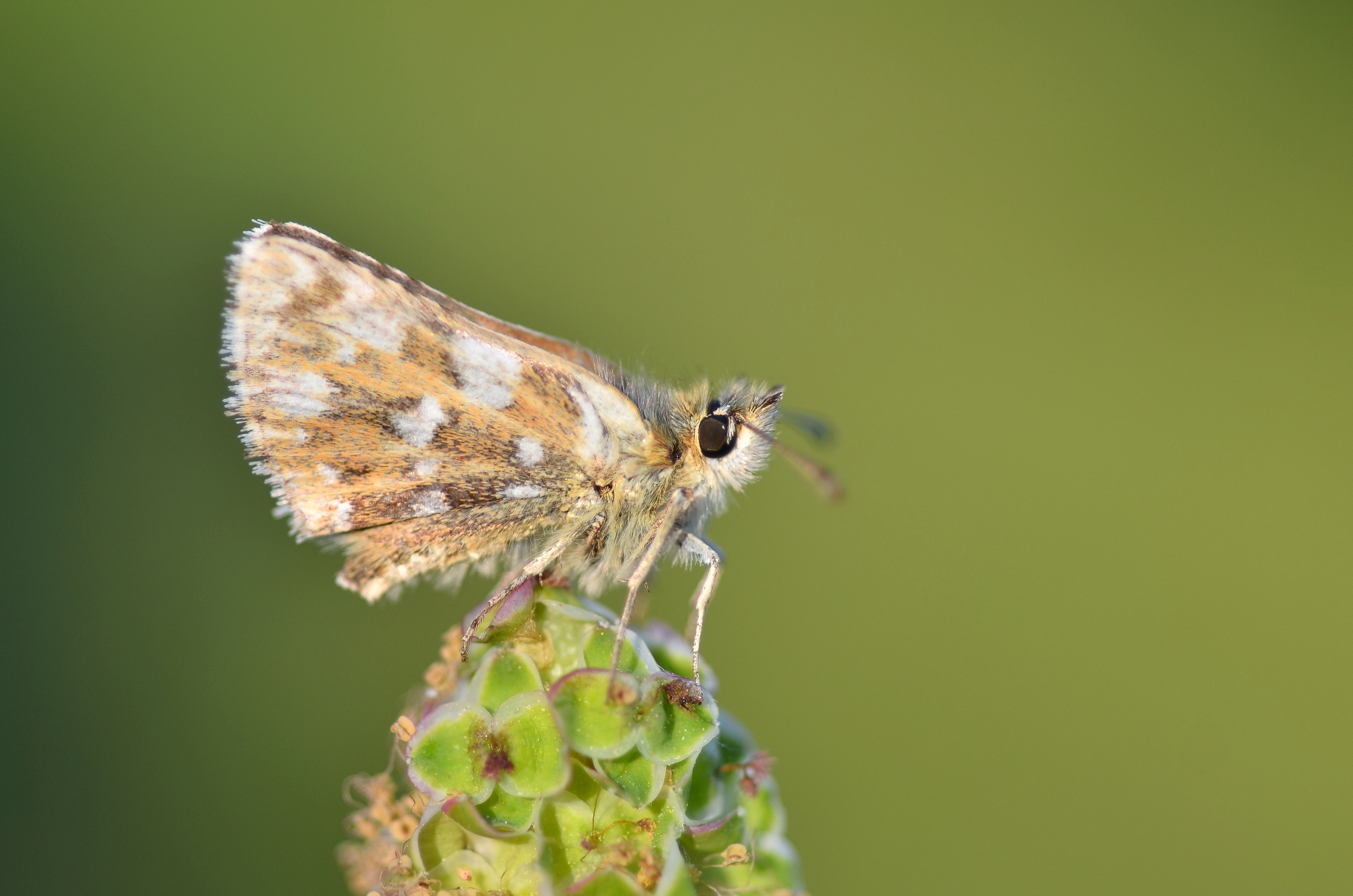

Scientific classification
- Kingdom: Animalia
- Phylum: Arthropoda
- Class: Insecta
- Order: Lepidoptera
- Family: Hesperiidae
- Genus: Spialia
- Species: S. sertorius

Binomial name
- Spialia sertorius (Hoffmannsegg, 1804)

Synonyms
- Hesperia sertorius Hoffmannsegg, 1804; Papilio sao Hübner; Spialia hibiscae Hemming, 1936; Powellia sertorius parvula Verity, 1921; Hesperia hibiscae minor Rebel, 1910; Powellia gracilis Verity, 1921; Powellia subgracilis Verity, 1912; Powellia guadarramensis Warren, 1925; Powellia gavarniensis Warren, 1926; Powellia alioides Verity, 1926; Syrichtus ali Oberthür, 1881; Syrichtus sao therapnoides Oberthür, 1910; Spialia sertorius ali f. rungsi Picard, 1950

= Spialia sertorius =

Species of insect

Spialia sertorius, commonly known as the red-underwing skipper, is a butterfly of the family Hesperiidae.

== Description ==
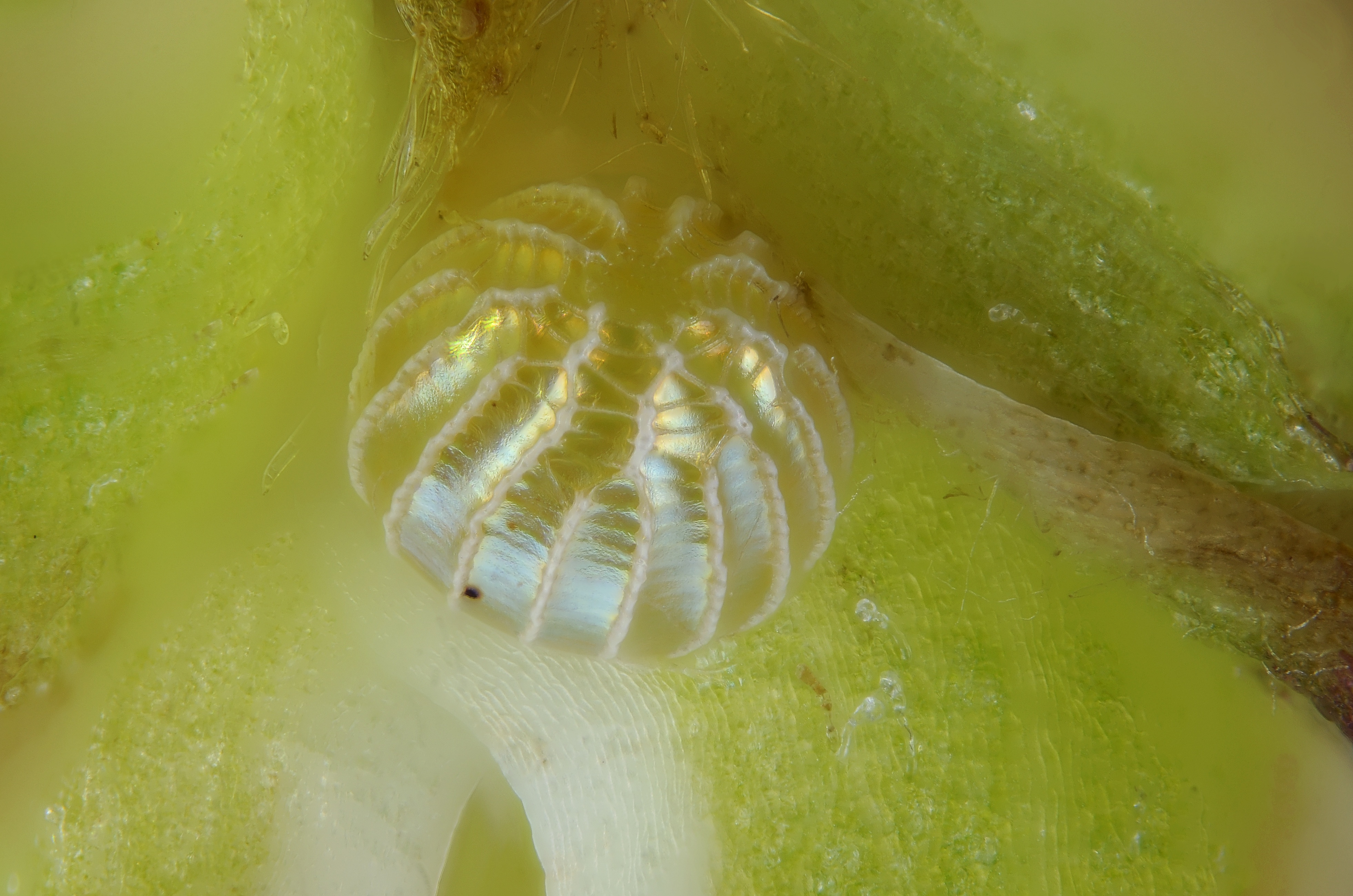
Egg

The red-underwing skipper can be confused with the species of the genus Pyrgus. The underside has a cinnamon-red to yellowish base tone, while it is primarily greenish to brownish in the Pyrgus species. Since this coloring is less evident in older butterflies (and deviations occur), the characteristic arrangement of the spots on the underside of the hind wing should always be used to determine. On the upper side of the forewing, there is a series of small, distinctly bright spots in the submarginal bandage, which runs in a regular flat curve to the front edge. The four areas of the post-discal region further towards the wing base are also in a row, while in the species of the genus Pyrgus, only three are side by side, and the fourth is disengaged. The wingspan is 22–26 mm.

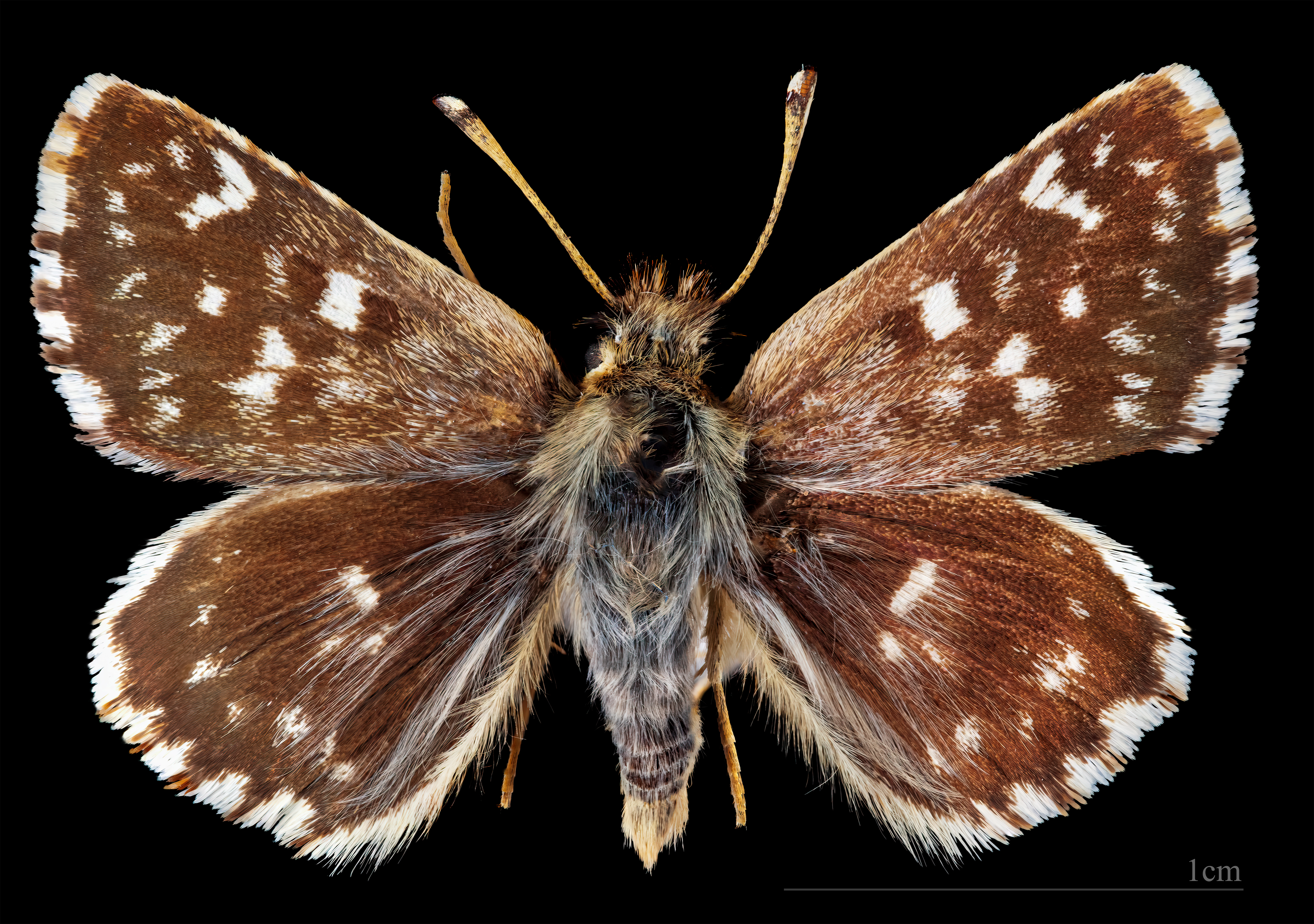
Dorsal side

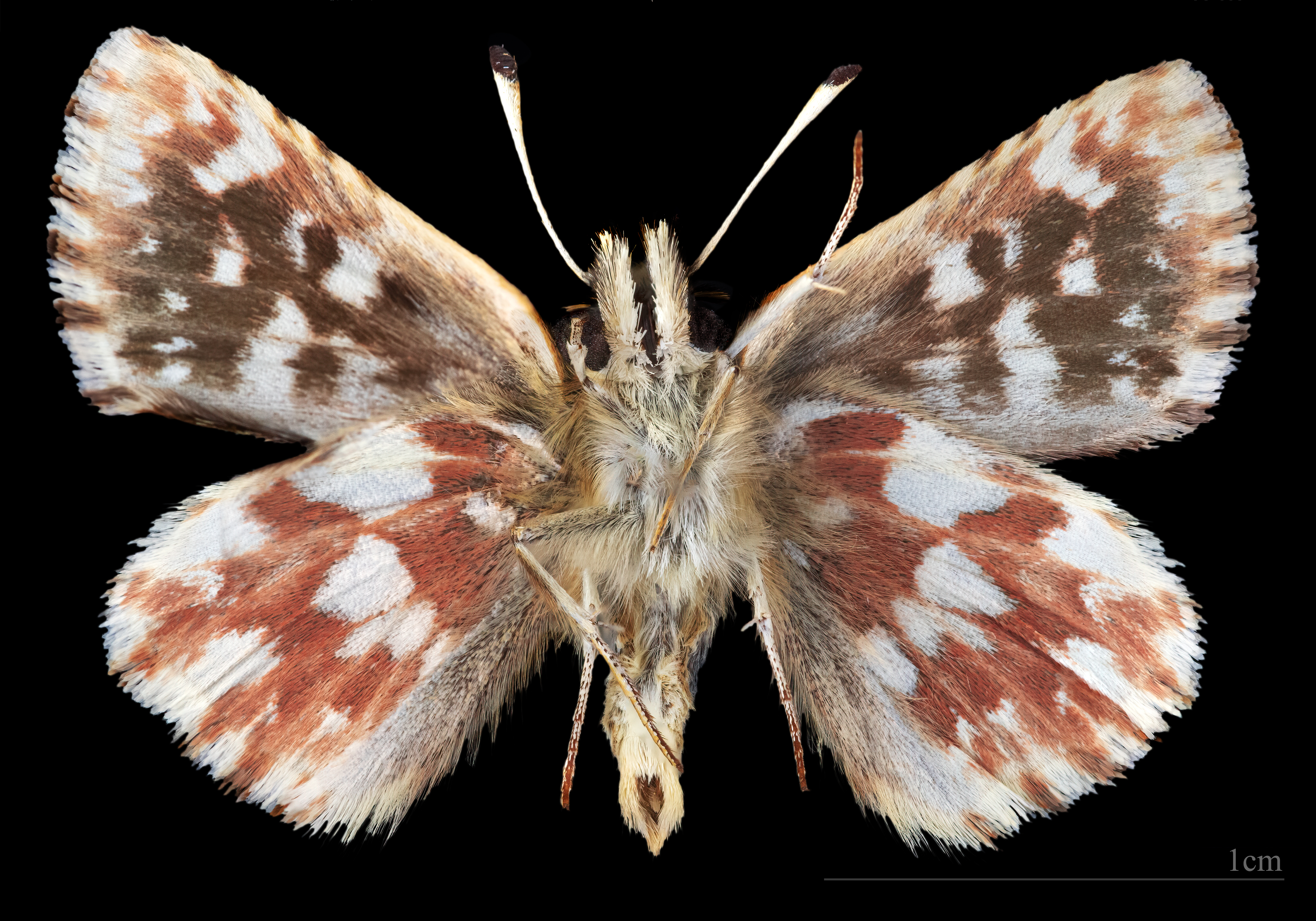
Ventral side

The identification situation in Spain is difficult, as the Spialia rosae described from there in 2016 flies together with Spialia sertorius at altitudes around 1000 m.

== Range ==
Spialia sertorius is commonly found in Western and Central Europe. To the south, the area extends over southern Europe to North Africa, and extends eastward to western Poland, the Czech Republic, Slovenia and Croatia. However, the species is absent in Scandinavia and Great Britain and is extinct in the Netherlands. In Germany, Spialia sertorius is absent in the northeastern federal states.

== Habitat ==
Due to the location requirements of Sanguisorba minor, there is a close connection between Spialia sertorius and poor grasslands on limestone or calcareous conglomerates. Even if the host plants have their main occurrence in arid grasslands or the gaps in pioneer stages of semi-dry grasslands, there is a strong preference for plants in small locations with particularly favorable thermal conditions.

In Central Europe, Spialia sertorius occurs from lower altitudes to altitudes above 1000 m, with the reports showing a clear maximum at 400–500 m, which, compared to most reports, is disproportionately high. Above 1000 m, the thermal requirements of the species are only met at locations that are particularly favorable in terms of microclimate, such as south-facing slopes. The altitudinal limit of the host plant in the Bavarian Alps is usually only a little over 1200 m. However, from the warm years after the Second World War, there are documents with altitudes around 1700m and 1700–2000 m. The butterflies had likely drifted.

== Ecology ==
The butterfly flies from April to September, depending on the location. There are usually two generations per year, with adults of the second generation being smaller than those of the first. Spialia sertorius can develop two generations in all major areas of Central Europe. The significantly lower number of reports from the second generation here suggests that they appear less frequently and not in all years. A second generation with fewer individuals from the Palatinate is also known, and is attributed to a significant part of the offspring of the spring generation no longer developing in the same year, but only pupating after the hibernation in April. The earliest Bavarian pieces come from the second half of April in the hot spring of 2007. From the turn of the month to May, the first observations are available from several other years.

The main flight period of the first generation usually begins in mid-May and reaches its maximum at the end of May, with reports then falling sharply by the end of July. From around the middle of August, there are signs of a renewed accumulation of reports that can be traced back to the appearance of the second generation. At the beginning of September, fresh butterflies were observed on the Munich plain. In the Alpine region, the reports only range from mid-May to mid-August. The data indicate that the formation of a second generation does not occur everywhere or regularly. However, few reports from heights over 1000 m are available after mid-July. This indicates that in favorable years, images of a subsequent generation occasionally appear even at such altitudes.

The red-underwing skipper only uses Sanguisorba minor as a site to lay eggs and a food source for caterpillars. The eggs of the first generation are mainly laid on the flower heads that are still closed but occasionally also on the leaves. Since Sanguisorba minor only blooms again regularly after the summer drought in arid grassland, the second-generation females in many places only have leaves available as an egg-laying medium. This is why they mainly glue their eggs to the upper side of leaflets of the pinnate leaves of the host plants. Leaves lying on the ground are preferred.

Young caterpillars hatched in flower heads feed on ripening seeds and flower parts during the first two stages; those from eggs laid on leaves initially feed on those. Later the caterpillars live in leaf bags made of leaflets from the host plant. According to field observations in Switzerland, the caterpillars spend the winter in a partial leaf of the Sanguisorba minor spun together as housing. Pupation took place on the ground in a web of leaf pieces.

The images are characterized by a very rapid flight close to the ground. The males are easiest to spot because they behave territorially and regularly visit places like Sanguisorba minor flowers. The images are not seen too often when visiting flowers. There are multiple reports of feedings on Hippocrepis comosa and Lotus corniculatus from Bavaria. These plants are also important nectar plants for Baden-Württemberg and the Palatinate. Furthermore, the species was observed on Thymus spp. in Bavaria, as well as on Globularia cordifolia, Teucrium montanum, Geranium sanguineum and Pimpinella spp. The males, in particular, like to suckle on moist soil.

== Conservation ==
The species depends on preserving poorly overgrown grasslands with a favorable microclimate. Even rock areas on dry slopes are no longer used as a reproductive habitat due to shade provided by neighboring trees. Grazing habitats between May and the end of July is problematic because of the loss of the flower heads. In the case of cattle grazing, a small amount of grazing is sufficient for creating open ground areas, especially on slopes. Intensive grazing should be avoided, as eutrophication through the feces must be avoided.

Mowing is unsuitable for maintaining the necessary habitat structures in most locations, as it encourages the development of closed, grass-dominated vegetation. Due to their less extreme site conditions, numerous habitats, such as urban wastelands or railway embankments, can hardly be preserved in the long term through biotope maintenance alone. In this case, it is essential to ensure site dynamics by deliberately relocating the succession by removing the topsoil or creating nutrient-poor gravel sites in a close spatial network.

== Taxonomy ==
Synonyms:

- Papilio sao (Huebner, 1803)
- Spialia hibiscae (Hemming, 1936)

Subspecies:

- Spialia sertorius sertorius (Europe)
- Spialia sertorius ali (Oberthür, 1881) (Morocco, Algeria, Tunisia)
