= Spialia osthelderi =

Scientific classification
- Kingdom: Animalia
- Phylum: Arthropoda
- Class: Insecta
- Order: Lepidoptera
- Family: Hesperiidae
- Genus: Spialia
- Species: S. osthelderi

Binomial name
- Spialia osthelderi (Pfeiffer, 1932)

Synonyms
- Hesperia (Ateleomorpha) osthelderi Pfeiffer, 1932; Spialia osthelder struveoides Brandt, 1939

Species of butterfly

Spialia osthelderi, Osthelder's skipper, is a butterfly in the family Hesperiidae. It is found from Asia Minor, the Middle East to Lebanon and through Iraq and Iran to Afghanistan. The habitat consists of dry stream beds and stony slopes in mountainous areas up to altitudes of 2,600 meters.

Adults are on wing from April to May, probably in two generations per year.

== Subspecies ==
- Spialia osthelderi osthelderi (Asia Minor to the Middle East, Syria, Lebanon, Iraq, western Iran)
- Spialia osthelderi gecko Evans, 1949 (Kopet-Dagh and Iran to Afghanistan, Sussamyr Mountains)
