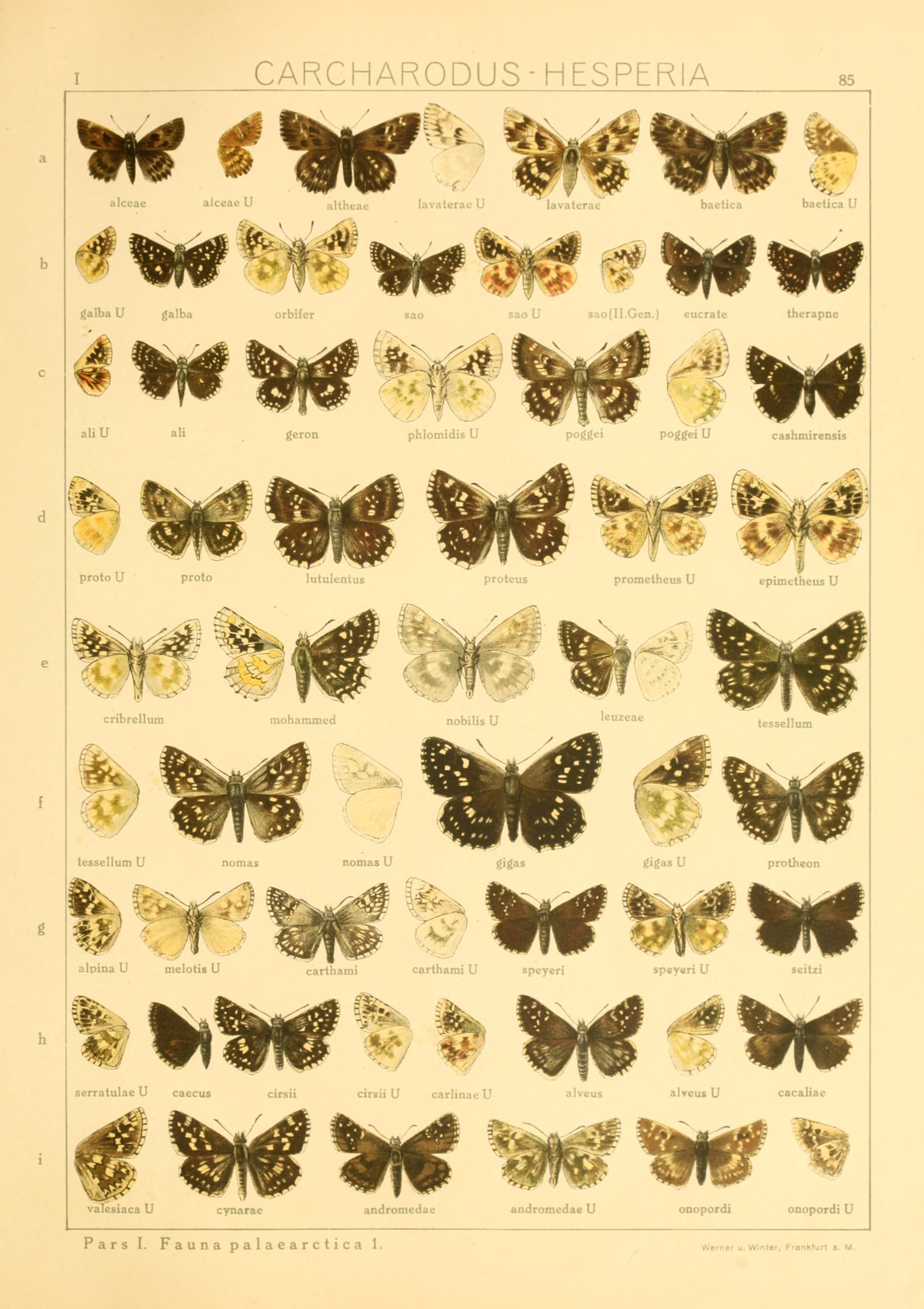
- c

Scientific classification
- Domain: Eukaryota
- Kingdom: Animalia
- Phylum: Arthropoda
- Class: Insecta
- Order: Lepidoptera
- Family: Hesperiidae
- Genus: Spialia
- Species: S. phlomidis

Binomial name
- Spialia phlomidis (Herrich-Schäffer, 1845)

Synonyms
- Hesperia phlomidis Herrich-Schäffer, 1845; Syricthus eupator Hemming, 1932; Syrichtus jason Oberthür, 1912; Spialia phlomidis kiki Higgins, 1974

= Spialia phlomidis =

Species of butterfly

Spialia phlomidis, the Persian skipper, is a butterfly of the family Hesperiidae. It is found in Albania, North Macedonia, Greece, southern Russia, Asia Minor and Iran. The habitat consists of dry steppe habitats at moderate elevations.

The length of the forewings is 14–15 mm.The median band is complete and continuous. The triangular spot between veins 6 and 7 is strongly elongated, and the one in interspace 8 continued to the angle. Adults are on wing from June to July in one generation.

The larvae feed on Convolvulus libanotica.

== Subspecies ==
- Spialia phlomidis phlomidis (Bulgaria, Greece, Turkey, southern Russia, Iran, Alai)
- Spialia phlomidis hermona Evans, 1956 (Lebanon)
