= Spialia struvei =

Scientific classification
- Domain: Eukaryota
- Kingdom: Animalia
- Phylum: Arthropoda
- Class: Insecta
- Order: Lepidoptera
- Family: Hesperiidae
- Genus: Spialia
- Species: S. struvei

Binomial name
- Spialia struvei (Püngeler, 1914)

Synonyms
- Hesperia struvei Püngeler, 1914; Spialia fetida Zhdanko, 1992

Species of butterfly

Spialia struvei is a butterfly in the family Hesperiidae. It is found from Iran to Dzungaria in north-west China . The habitat consists of dry areas on hills and low mountains at altitudes between 200 and 1,000 meters in the steppe-desert zone.

Adults are on wing from June to July.

== Subspecies ==
- Spialia struvei struvei
- Spialia struvei irida Zhdanko, 1993 (Alaisky Mountains)
- Spialia struvei fetida Zhdanko, 1992 (western Kazakhstan)
