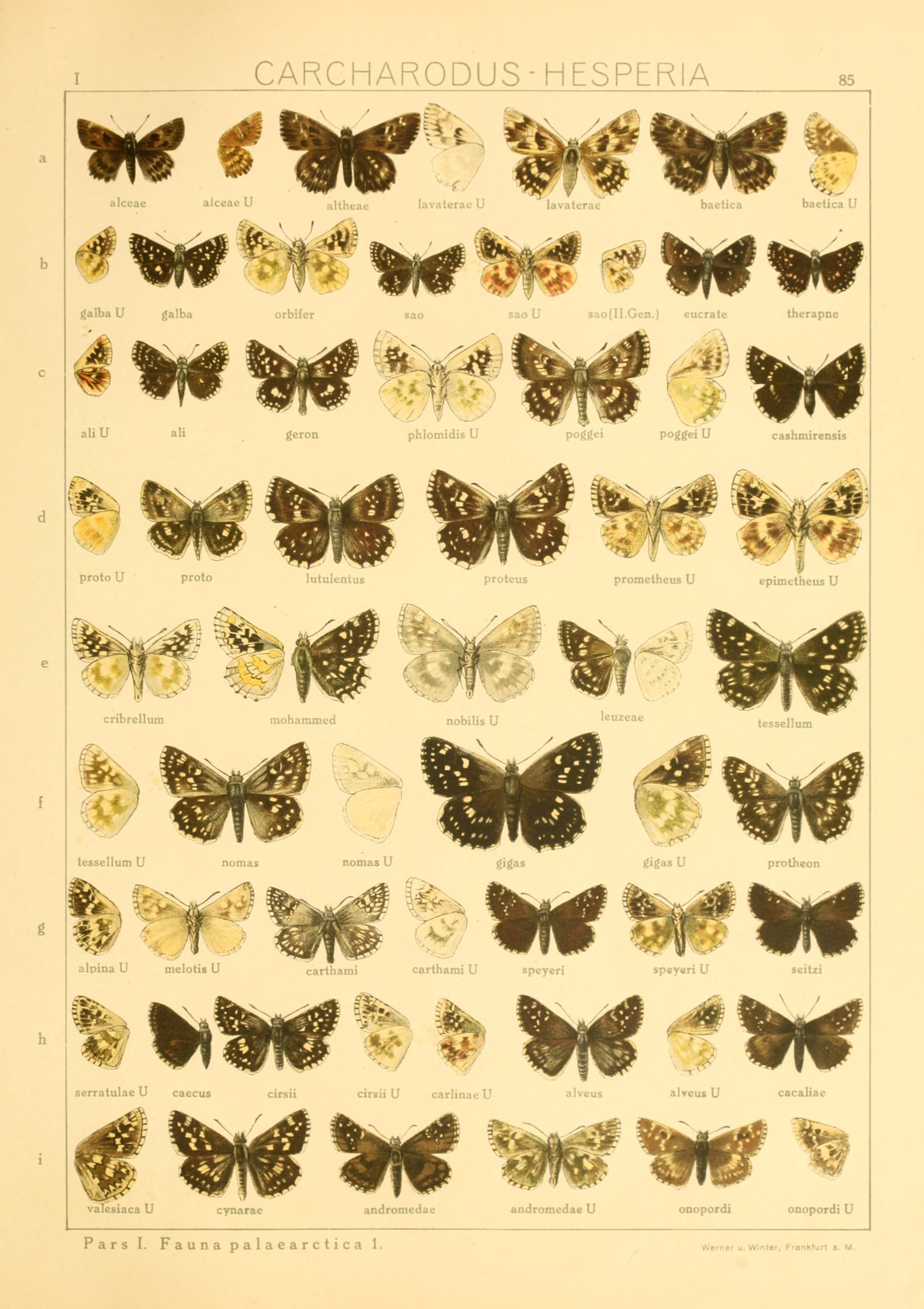
- Third butterfly in row "c"

Scientific classification
- Domain: Eukaryota
- Kingdom: Animalia
- Phylum: Arthropoda
- Class: Insecta
- Order: Lepidoptera
- Family: Hesperiidae
- Genus: Spialia
- Species: S. geron

Binomial name
- Spialia geron (Watson, 1893)

Synonyms
- Hesperia geron Watson, 1893

= Spialia geron =

Species of butterfly

Spialia geron is a butterfly in the family Hesperiidae. It is found in Afghanistan and western Pakistan.
