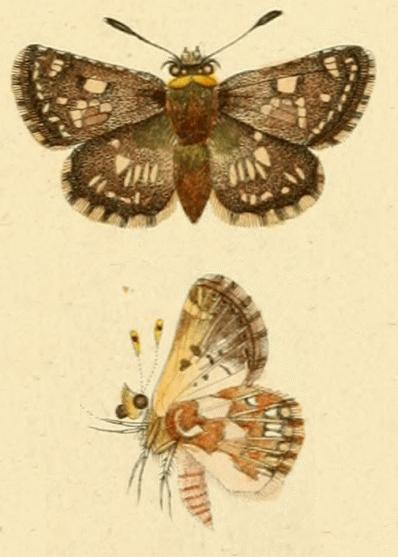

Scientific classification
- Kingdom: Animalia
- Phylum: Arthropoda
- Class: Insecta
- Order: Lepidoptera
- Family: Hesperiidae
- Genus: Spialia
- Species: S. therapne

Binomial name
- Spialia therapne (Rambur, 1832)

Synonyms
- Hesperia therapne Rambur, 1832

= Spialia therapne =

Species of butterfly

Spialia therapne, the Corsican red-underwing skipper, is a butterfly in the family Hesperiidae. It is found on the Mediterranean islands of Corsica and Sardinia.

The wingspan is 19–21 mm. The underside of hindwing is brick-red, with a white macular band, of which the discocellular spot is proximally neither dentate nor prolonged. On the underside the spots and fringes are yellowish red. Adults are on wing from April to September in multiple generations per year.

The larvae feed on Sanguisorba minor. They make a shelter of spun leaves.
