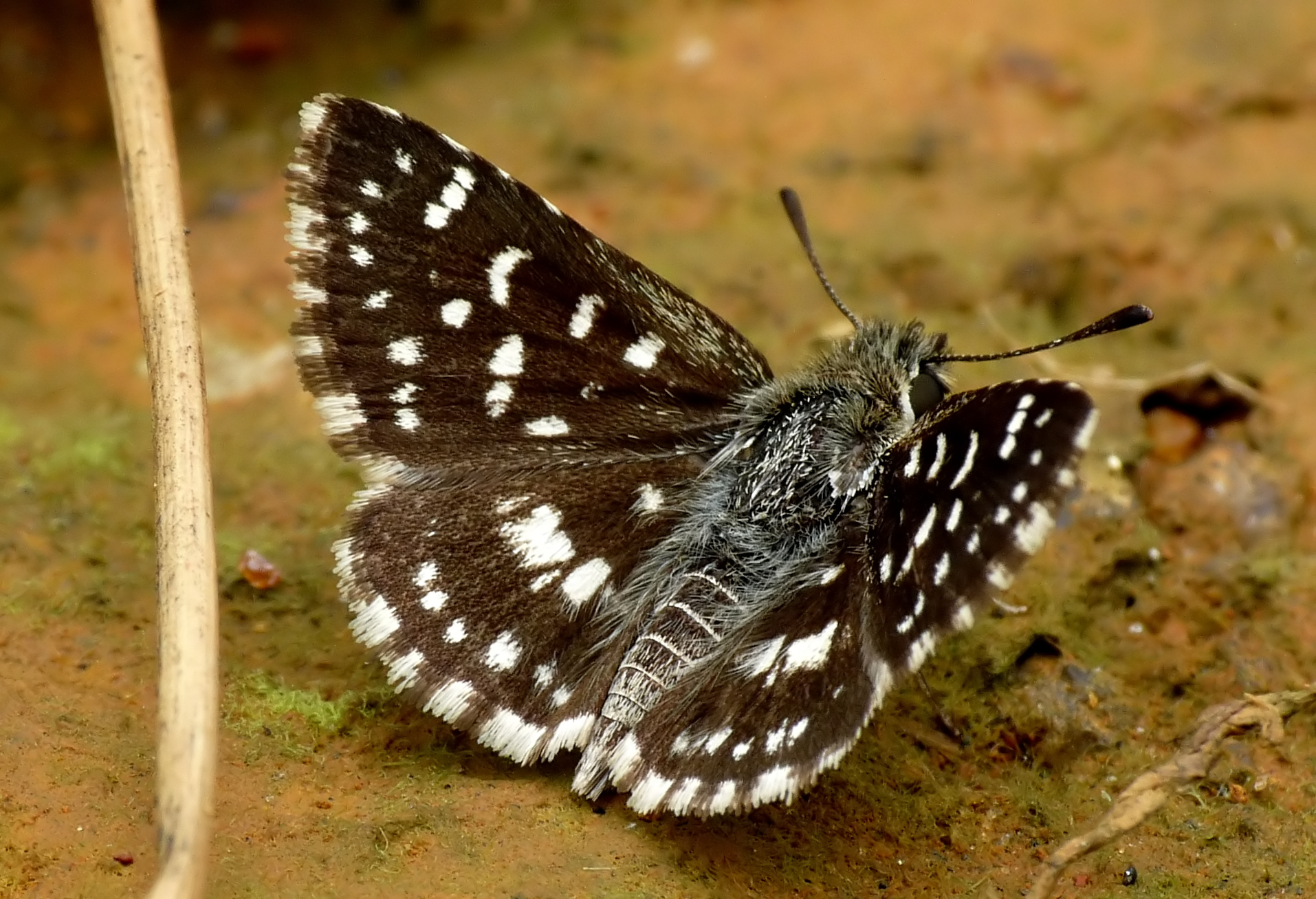
- Dorsal view
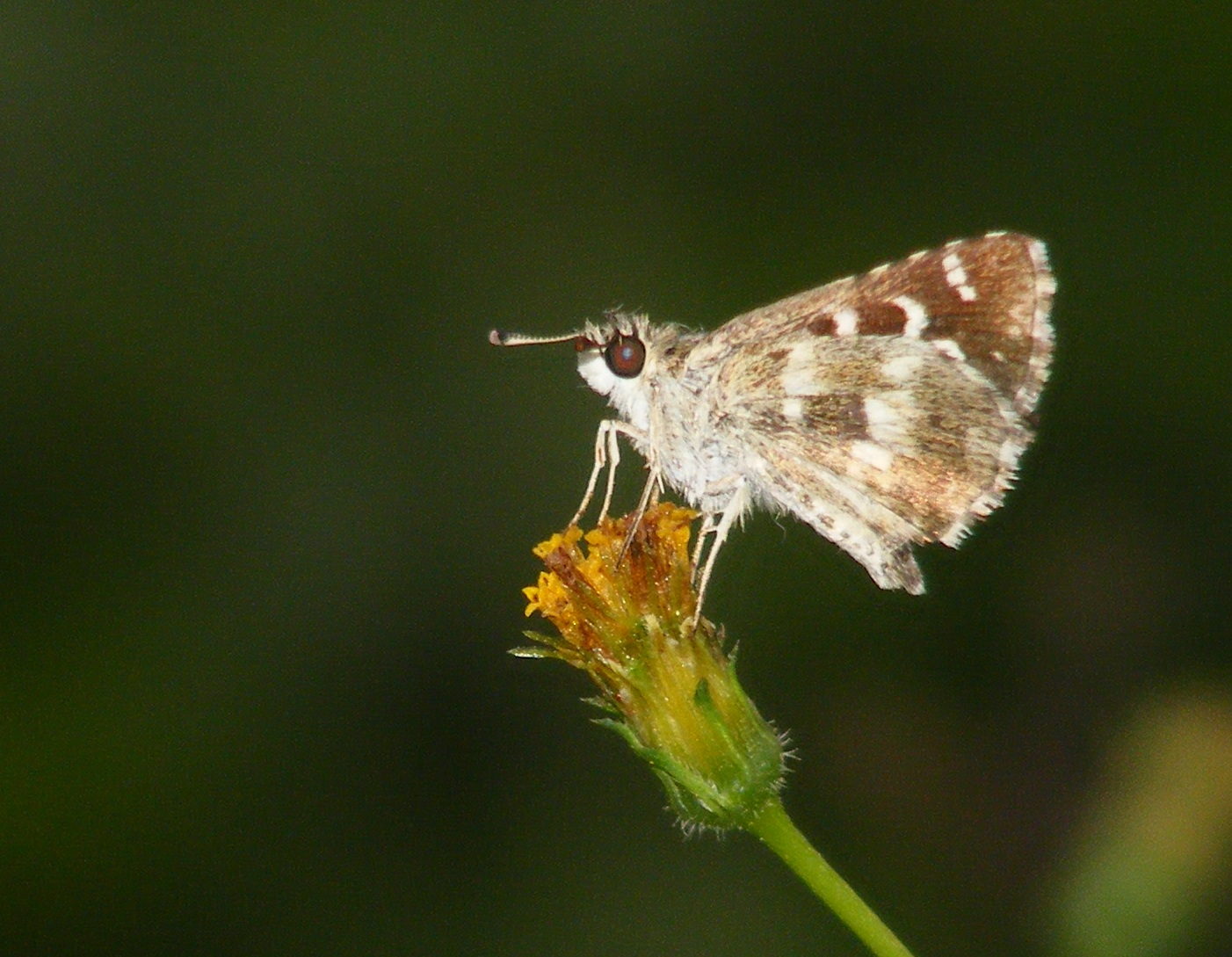
- Ventral view

Scientific classification
- Kingdom: Animalia
- Phylum: Arthropoda
- Clade: Pancrustacea
- Class: Insecta
- Order: Lepidoptera
- Family: Hesperiidae
- Genus: Spialia
- Species: S. galba

Binomial name
- Spialia galba (Fabricius, 1793)

Synonyms
- Hesperia galba Fabricius, 1793; Pyrgus superna Moore, [1866]

= Spialia galba =

Indian Grizzled skipper

Species of butterfly

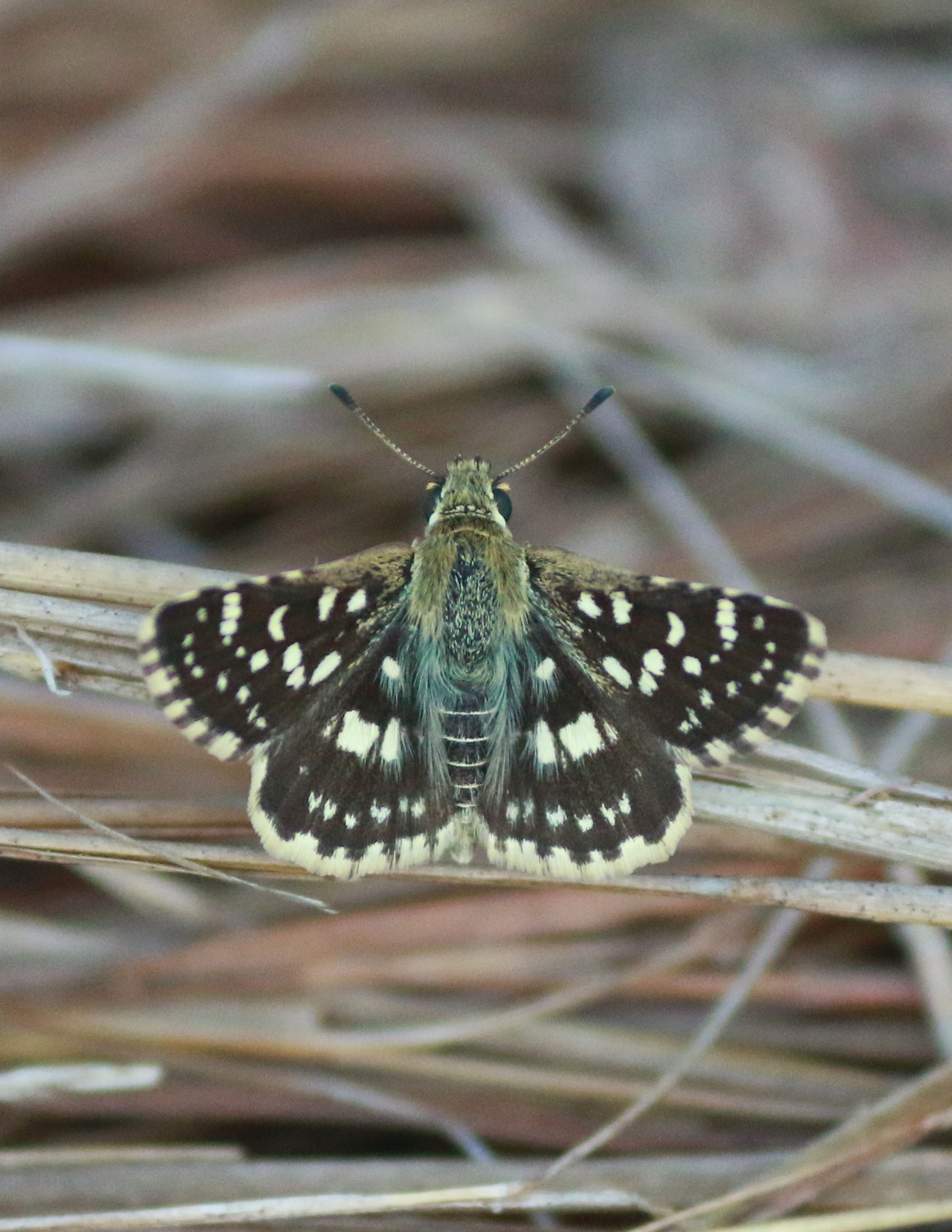
Spialia galba, Indian grizzled skipper

Spialia galba, the Indian grizzled skipper, is a hesperiid butterfly which is found in South Asia and parts of Southeast Asia.

== Distribution and status ==
The butterfly ranges from Sri Lanka, India to the Shan states in northern Myanmar, Thailand, Vietnam and Hainan.

The butterfly is very common in India up to an altitude of 1800 m.

== Subspecies ==
- Spialia galba galba (Pakistan, India, Kashmir, Nepal, Sikkim, Bhutan, Ceylon, Thailand)
- Spialia galba shanta Evans, 1956 (Burma)
- Spialia galba chenga Evans, 1956 (China: Hainan)

== Description ==
Male. Upperside black, with a slight olive tint, spotted with white. Forewing with three spots in the cell, sub-basal, medial, and terminal, a spot on the sub-median vein below the sub-basal spot, a discal series of eight spots, commencing with three that are sub-apical, close together from near the costa, then two together, the lower the larger, then two larger, more or less square conjugated spots a little inwards and a spot on the sub-median vein still inwards; a complete sub-marginal series of small spots one in each interspace; four short white streaks on the outer half of the costal line. Hindwing with a sub-basal spot in the cell, a larger somewhat quadrate spot at the end of the cell, with a smaller spot below it, and a still smaller spot above it, a sub-marginal series of small spots, one in each interspace becoming obsolete upwards. Cilia of both wings checkered, black and white. Underside grey. Forewing with the spots as above, but larger. Hindwing with the abdominal fold white, the cell spots extended, there being three sub-basal spots, the cell end spot expanded into a continuous white band, with irregular margins from the costa to the abdominal fold; the sub-marginal spots as on the upper side. Cilia of both wings checkered grey and white. Antennae with the shaft spotted with white above, pure white beneath, except the tip of the club which is dull orange; palpi, head and body above concolorous with the wings, on the underside white, legs also white. Female usually larger and darker black than the male, markings similar, the spots on the upperside often smaller.

— Charles Swinhoe, Lepidoptera Indica. Vol. X

Having a wingspan of only 24 to 27 mm, Spialia galba is identified by its unique pattern of black and white spots and its small size. The upperside is dark brown to black in colour with a light brown gloss and many small white spots. The wings have a chequered fringe. The underside is whitish. Sexes are identical.

== Habits ==
When sunny, the butterfly is found flying close to the ground and basking with the wings partly open. The forewing is partly closed while the hindwing is held fully open. It rests with wings closed. It has a swift, twisting but usually short flight. The Indian skipper visits flowers, preferring those with small flowers such as Tridax procumbens, (a common weed in India) and species of Dicplitera or Bidens. It sleeps on hanging grass blades and the tips of the branches of herbs.

== Life history ==
=== Egg ===
The egg is shiny, light green, dome shaped, ridged and fused together. The female lays her eggs anywhere and on any position of the young shoots of its food plant.

=== Caterpillar ===
The caterpillar is pale green with a wavy dark green line dorsally. It is cylindrical, but thicker in the centre and tapering towards the ends. The body is clothed with fine whitish bristles and a line of long white hair on both sides. The head of the butterfly is obscured by dark hair and the jaws are orange red and black tipped. The second segment of the early instars is dark brown and has a golden central bar on the nape. As the caterpillar matures, it develops prominent black-bordered orange markings on the neck. The caterpillar resides in a folded leaf secured from all sides except the entrance. It feeds in the late evenings and nocturnally.

=== Pupa ===
It has a thick, cylindrical, greyish-green pupa which tapers towards the abdomen. It is covered with fine dirty-white bristles near the head and eyes.

Life cycle

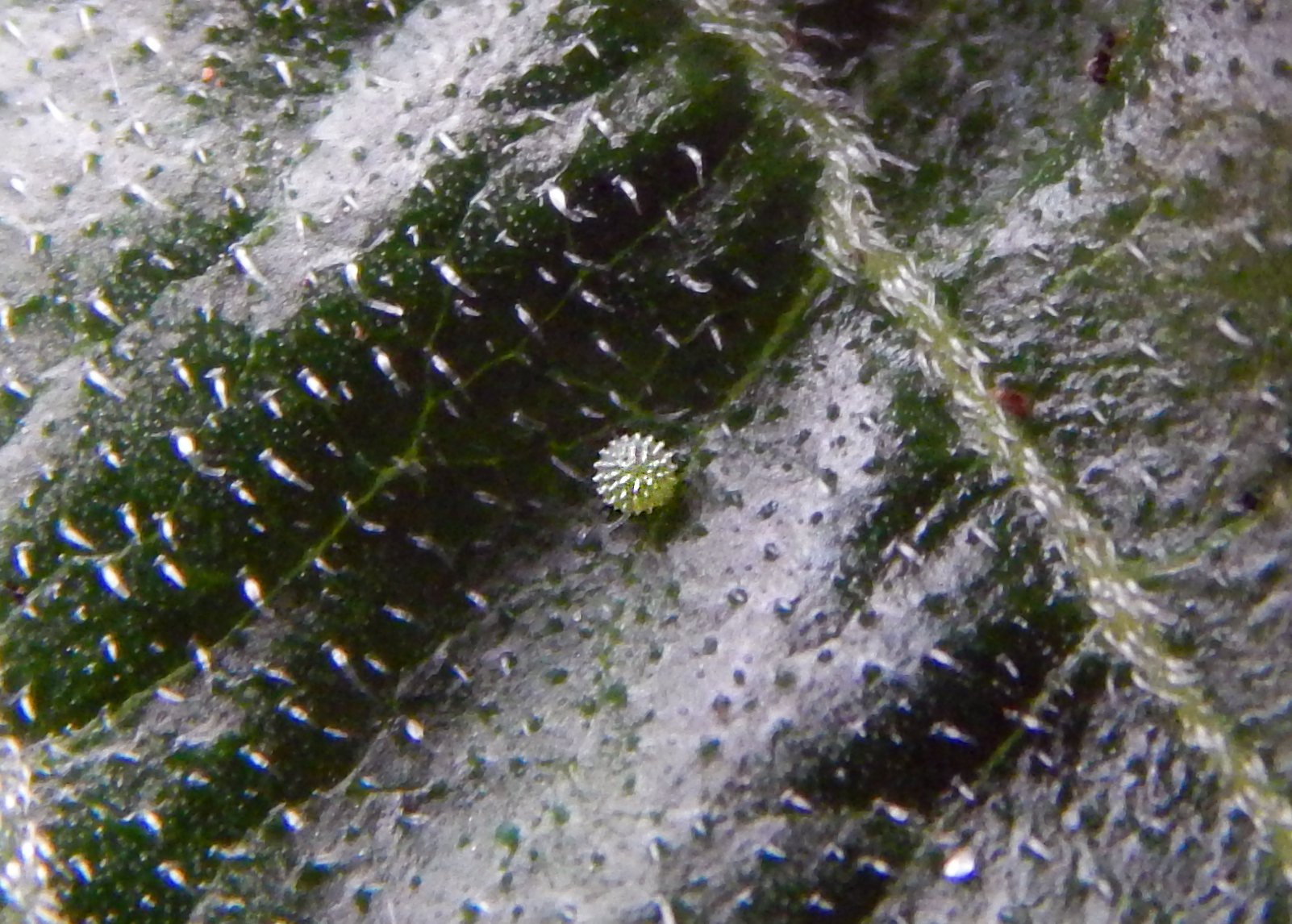
Egg

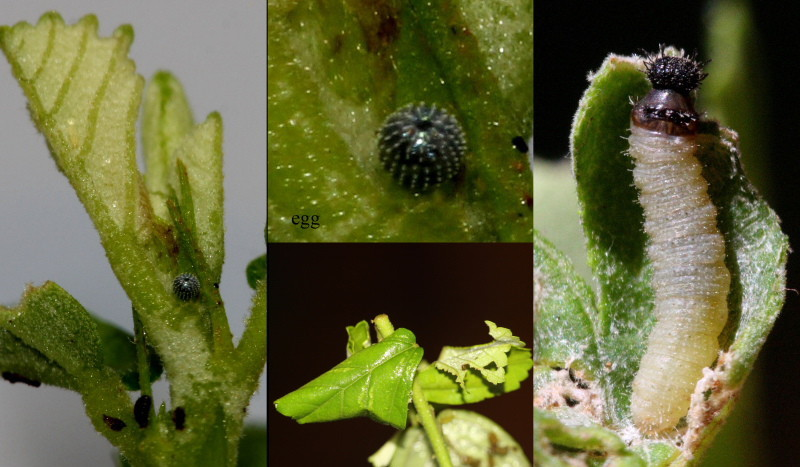
Egg and larva

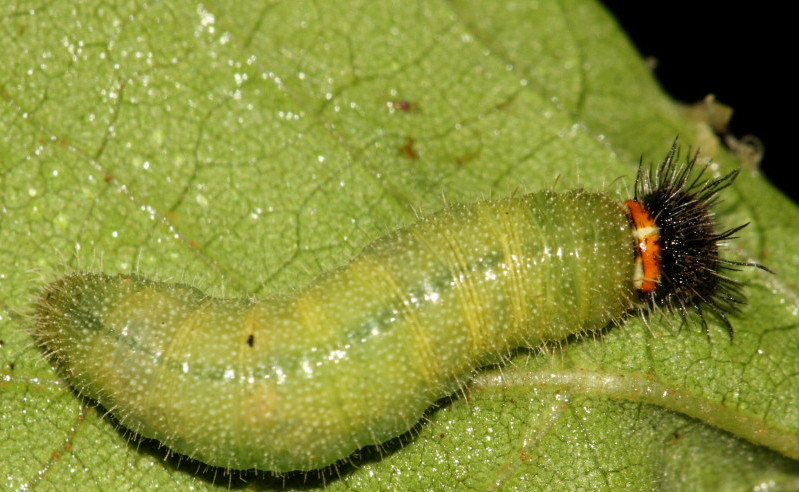
Larva

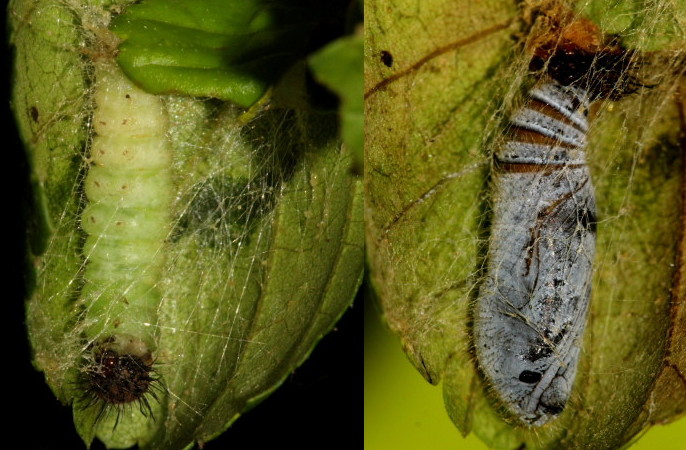
Pupating

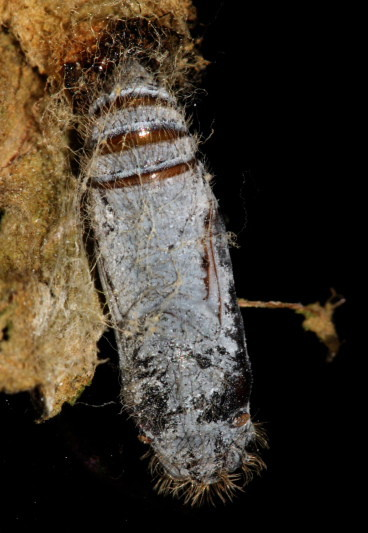
Pupa

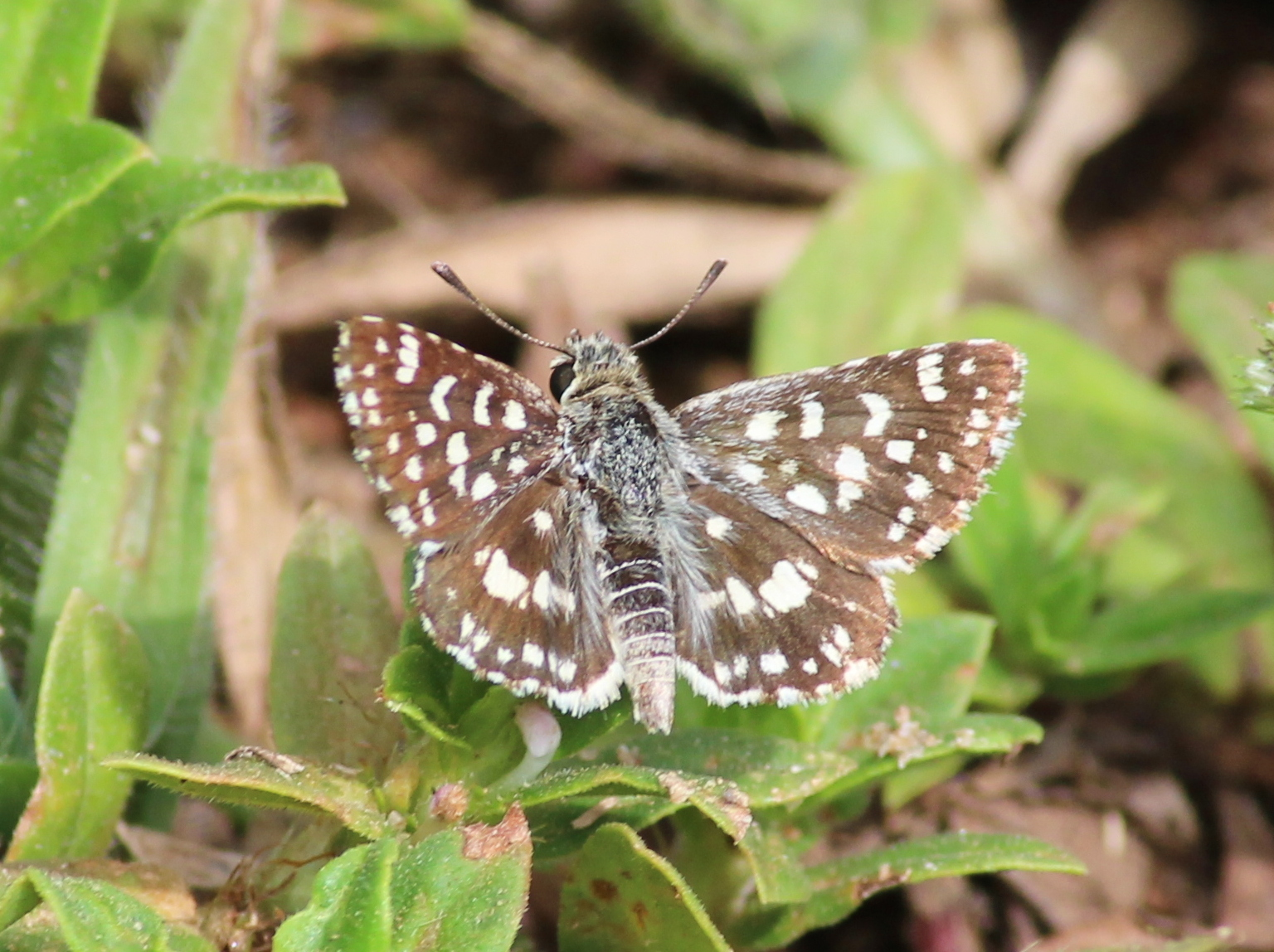
Imago (dorsal view)

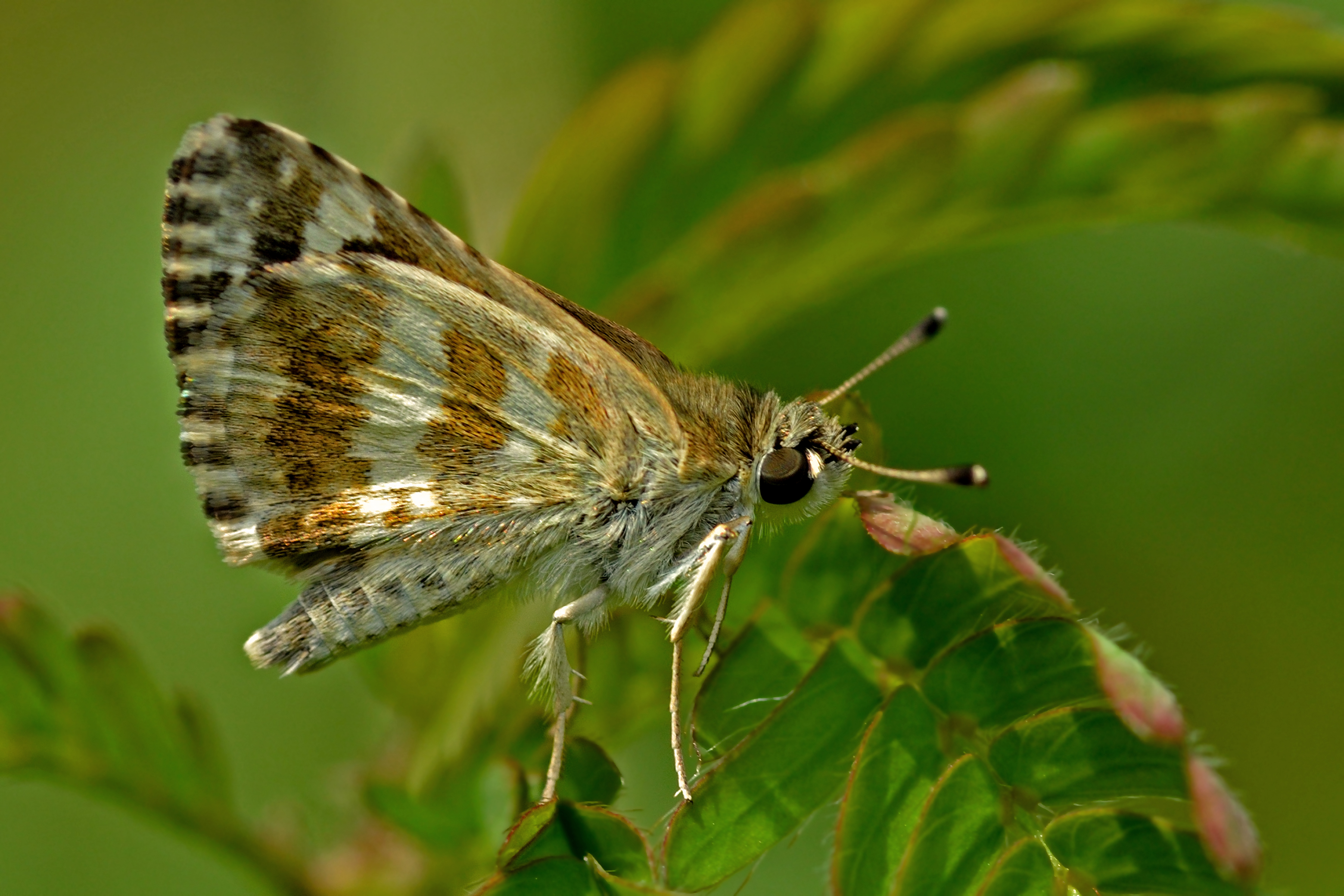
Imago (ventral view)

=== Food plants ===
- Fabaceae:
  - Soybean
- Malvaceae:
  - Alcea rosea
  - Hibiscus spp.
  - Melochia corchorifolia
  - Sida rhombifolia
  - Urena lobata
  - Waltheria indica

== See also ==
- Hesperiidae
- List of butterflies of India (Pyrginae)
- List of butterflies of India (Hesperiidae)
