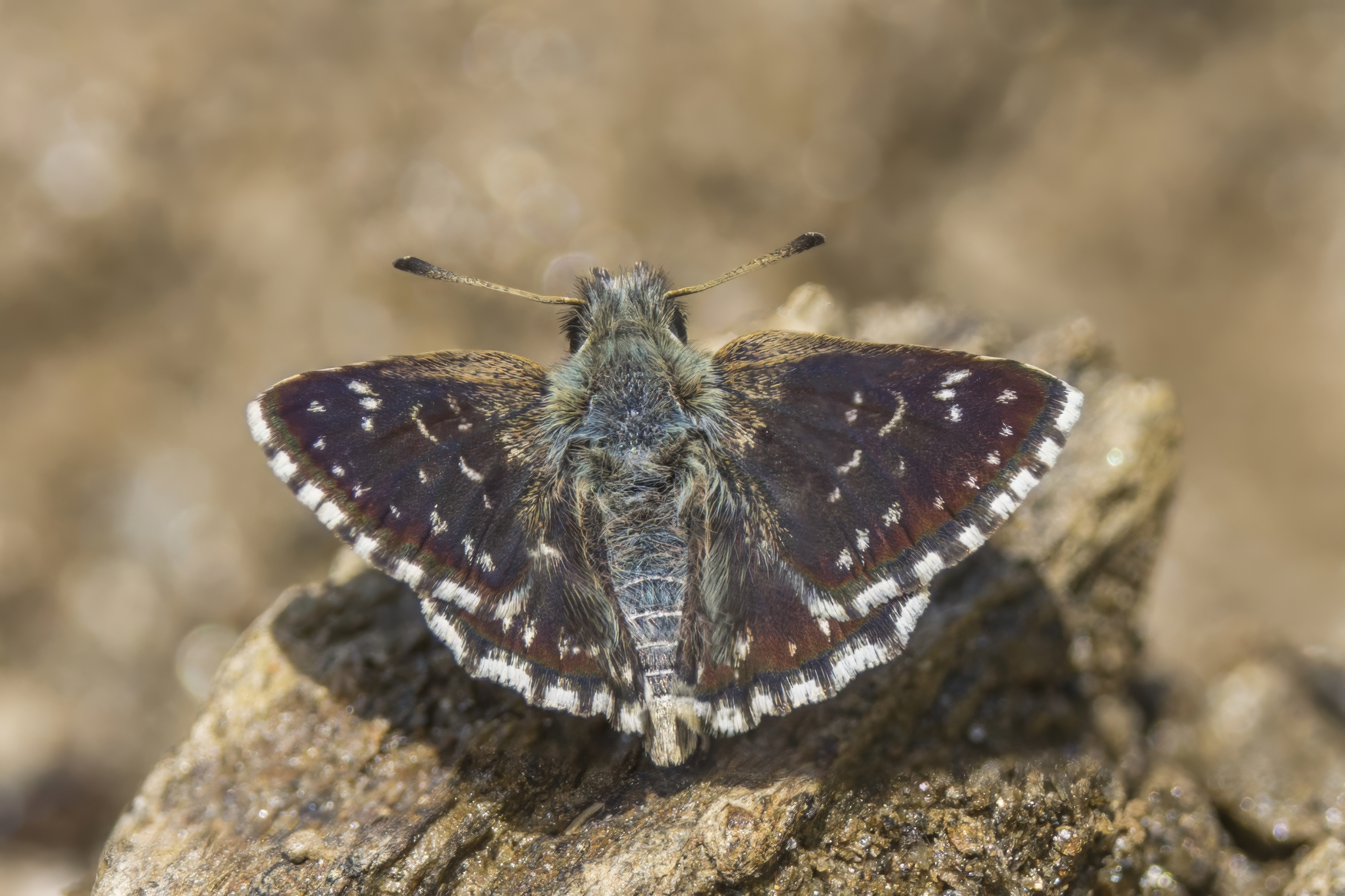

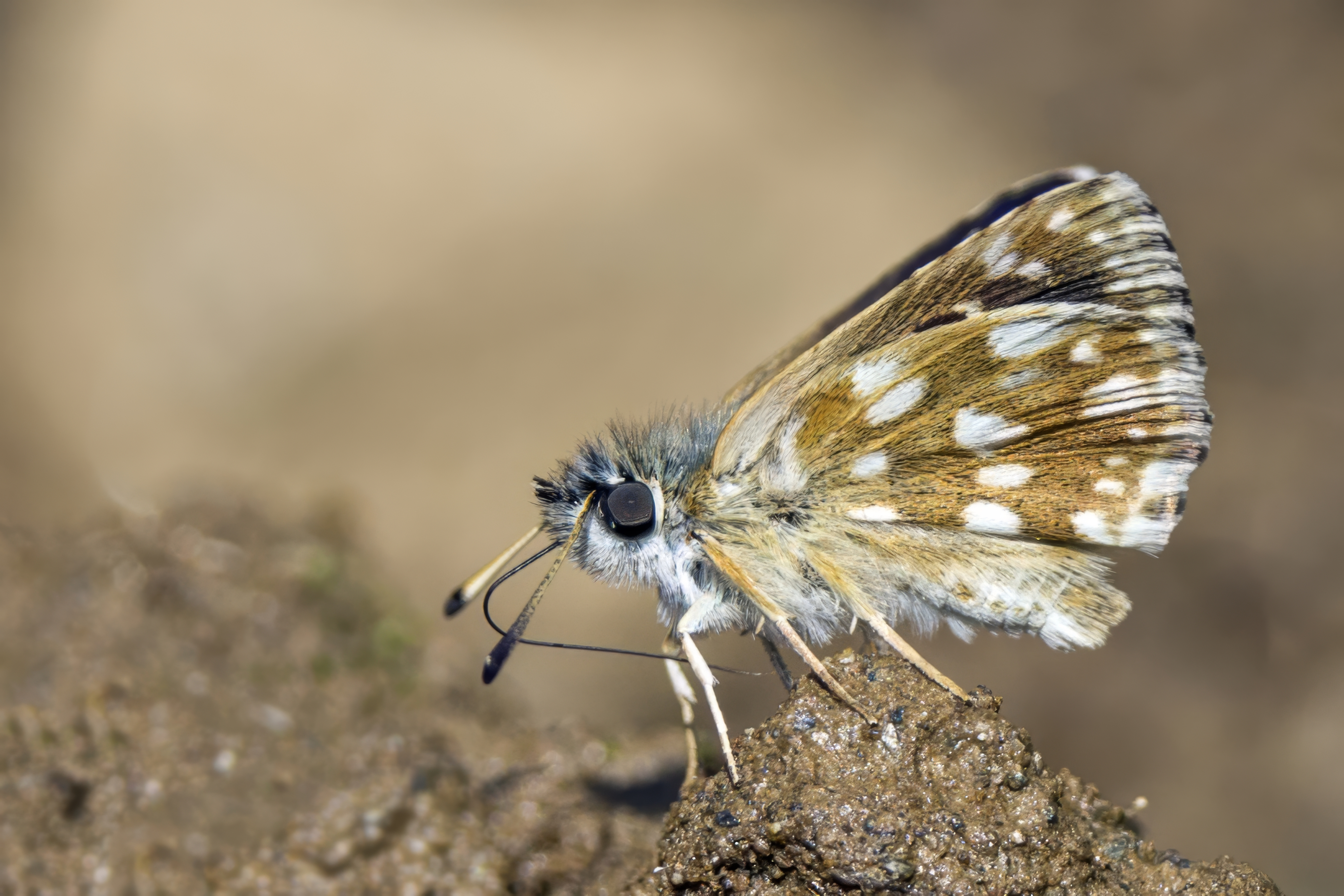
- both in Turkey

Scientific classification
- Kingdom: Animalia
- Phylum: Arthropoda
- Class: Insecta
- Order: Lepidoptera
- Family: Hesperiidae
- Genus: Spialia
- Species: S. orbifer

Binomial name
- Spialia orbifer (Hübner, [1823])

Synonyms
- Papilio orbifer Hübner, [1823]; Spialia tesselloides Herrich-Schäffer, [1845]; Spialia orbifer f. minor Rebel, 1909; Spialia posttesselloides Verity, 1938; Spialia orbifer hilaris (Staudinger, 1901); Spialia secunda Graves, 1925; Spialia orbifer carnea (Reverdin, 1927); Pyrgus orbifer var. lugens Staudinger, 1886

= Spialia orbifer =

Species of butterfly

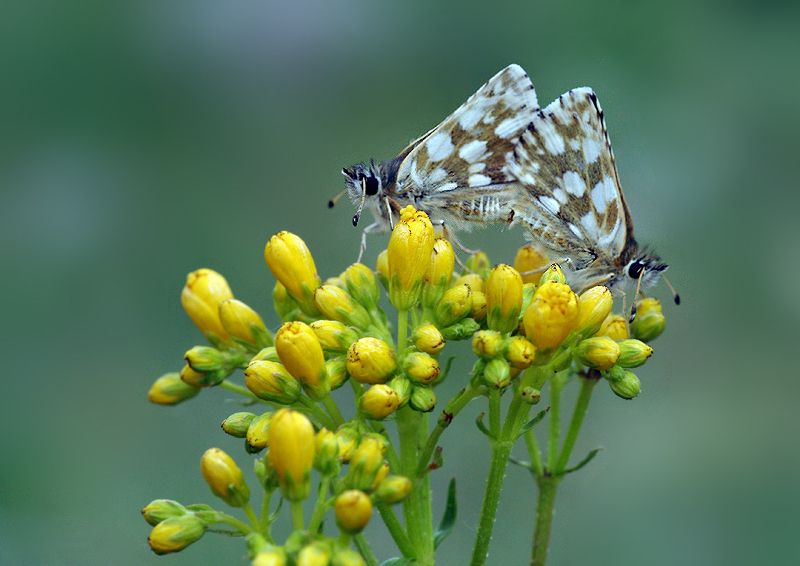
mating

Spialia orbifer, the orbed red-underwing skipper or Hungarian skipper is a butterfly of the family Hesperiidae. It is found from south-eastern Europe and temperate Asia to Korea. The habitat consists of steppe on plains and grassy slopes in the mountains.

The wingspan is 24–28 mm. Adults are on wing from April to August in one or two generations per year.

The larvae feed on Rubus idaeus, Sanguisorba officinalis, Sanguisorba minor and Potentilla gelida.

== Subspecies ==
- Spialia orbifer orbifer (South-eastern Europe to south-western Siberia, northern Iran and Sicily)
- Spialia orbifer hilaris (Staudinger, 1901) (south-eastern Turkey to Lebanon, Israel, Jordan, northern Iraq and western Iran)
- Spialia orbifer carnea (Reverdin, 1927) (Afghanistan, Baluchistan, Chitral)
- Spialia orbifer lugens (Staudinger, 1886) (Tian-Shan, north-eastern Iran, Transcaspia, southern Siberia to the Amur region)
- Spialia orbifer pseudolugens P. Gorbunov, 1995 (Altai, southern Urals)
