= Hermannia texana =

- Hermannia texana leafy stem with flowers and fruits

Scientific classification
- Kingdom: Plantae
- Clade: Tracheophytes
- Clade: Angiosperms
- Clade: Eudicots
- Clade: Rosids
- Order: Malvales
- Family: Malvaceae
- Genus: Hermannia
- Species: H. texana

Binomial name
- Hermannia texana A.Gray

Species of flowering plant

Hermannia texana, with no commonly used name, is a subshrub native to the US state of Texas, and adjacent northeastern Mexico. It belongs to the family Malvaceae.

== Description ==
In the limited distribution area where Hermannia texana is native, it stands out with its unusual flowers and fruits. Here are key features distinguishing the species:

- Its densely hairy to nearly hairless stems may lie on the ground with the tips turning upward, or stand erect, reaching up to 70 cm (28 in) long. All green parts usually bear branched, or "stellate," hairs sometimes intermixed with hairs topped with glands. Plants arise from a thickened, woody root.
- Leaves with stipules at their bases and petioles up to 27 mm (1 1/8 in) long have blades which are variously shaped, unlobed or rarely with beginnings of lobes. An image on this page shows blade margins crinkling in a manner suggesting low teeth.
- Inflorescences of 1-7 flowers arise in the axils of petioles. Flower pedicels are up to 3 mm (1/8 in) long and the flowers themselves only up to about 12 mm × 5.6 mm (1/2 in × 1/4 in) in size; their 5 sepals gradually narrow to slender tips. Corollas are yellow at first, becoming yellow-orange to red-orange or vermilion; they barely extend beyond the sepals. The petals stand erect, never spreading, with one petal edge overlapping the edge of the adjacent petal (convolute). At their bases they narrow into stalk-like "claws." The petals fall away late as the ovary matures. Long-persisting stamens opposite the petals and the ovary stand atop a stem-like gynophore up to 2.5 mm (3/32 in) tall. When fresh, the stamens' filaments are broad and flat, looking like a strangely elevated cluster of petals arising below the stalked ovary. Flowers and fruits are directed downward.
- Fruits up to 12 mm (1/2 in) tall are 5-angled capsules composed of 5 carpels, with up to 6 seeds per carpel cell. The fruit's 5 parts look like rounded, papery wings radiating from the center, and bear along their outer margins conspicuous fringes of very slender, flexible, hairy teeth up to 3.5 mm (1/8 in) high. In each carpel cell several seeds are held.

== Distribution ==
In the US, Hermannia texana occurs in southwestern Texas. In Mexico it is native to the northeastern states of Coahuila, Nuevo León, San Luis Potosí and Tamaulipas.

== Habitat ==
Hermannia texana occurs on rocky hillsides, in streambeds and canyons, in prairies, juniper and oak woodlands, Tamaulipan scrub or chaparral, and on the coastal plain at borders of salt marshes and among coastal dunes, up to 700 m (2,300 ft) above sea level.

== Pollinators ==
Hermannia texana flowers attract halictid bees, the sweatbees, and anthophorid bees, or digger bees. The large bee Centris atripes probably is an effective pollinator.

== In gardens ==
Hermannia texana appears to be little used in gardening, despite its unusual flowers and fruits. A study has found that it is highly susceptible to root rot.

== Taxonomy ==
In 1849 when Asa Gray formally described and named Hermannia texana, he was working with dried herbarium specimens. He described the flowers as "...yellow, or sometimes purple," with petals which spread widely. For the Malvaceae these were good guesses based on pressed material, but wrong for Hermannia texana.

=== Phylogeny ===
Molecular phylogenetic analysis using DNA sequencing indicates that Hermannia texana falls into the section Acicarpus, subsection Cristatae, along with Hermannia cristata, Hermannia inflata, Hermannia merxmuelleri, Hermannia palmeri, and Hermannia pauciflora. A striking feature of this section is that H. cristata and H. merxmuelleri are African species while the remaining taxa are American. Of the American taxa, H. palmeri and H. texana form a sister group. It is found likely that after Gondwanaland broke up separating the Americas from Africa, a relative of the African H. merxmuelleri crossed the Atlantic and set seed in the general area where today H. Texana occurs, and then speciated into H. texana and H. paucifolia. The African origin of other American species of the group possibly represent an independent dispersal from Africa. H. palmeri and H. texana diverged from their sister taxa about ±7.45 million years ago.

=== Etymology ===
The genus name Hermannia honors German physician and botanist Paul Hermann. The name was chosen but not published by French botanist Joseph Pitton de Tournefort.

The species name texana reflects its native distribution including part of the US state of Texas.

== Gallery ==
Flower and immature fruit

Flower from front

Flower from side

Dissected flower showing gynophore and petal-like filaments

Developing fruit atop drying stamens and gynophore

Almost mature 5-angled fruit

Reclining plant in habitat on slope below an Ashe Juniper
