= Spialia rosae =

Conservation status
- Least Concern (IUCN 3.1)

Scientific classification
- Kingdom: Animalia
- Phylum: Arthropoda
- Clade: Pancrustacea
- Class: Insecta
- Order: Lepidoptera
- Family: Hesperiidae
- Genus: Spialia
- Species: S. rosae

Binomial name
- Spialia rosae Hernández-Roldán, Dapporto, Dincă, Vicente & Vila, 2016

Species of butterfly

Spialia rosae is a butterfly of the family Hesperiidae. It is found only in Portugal and Spain.

The larvae feed on roses.
