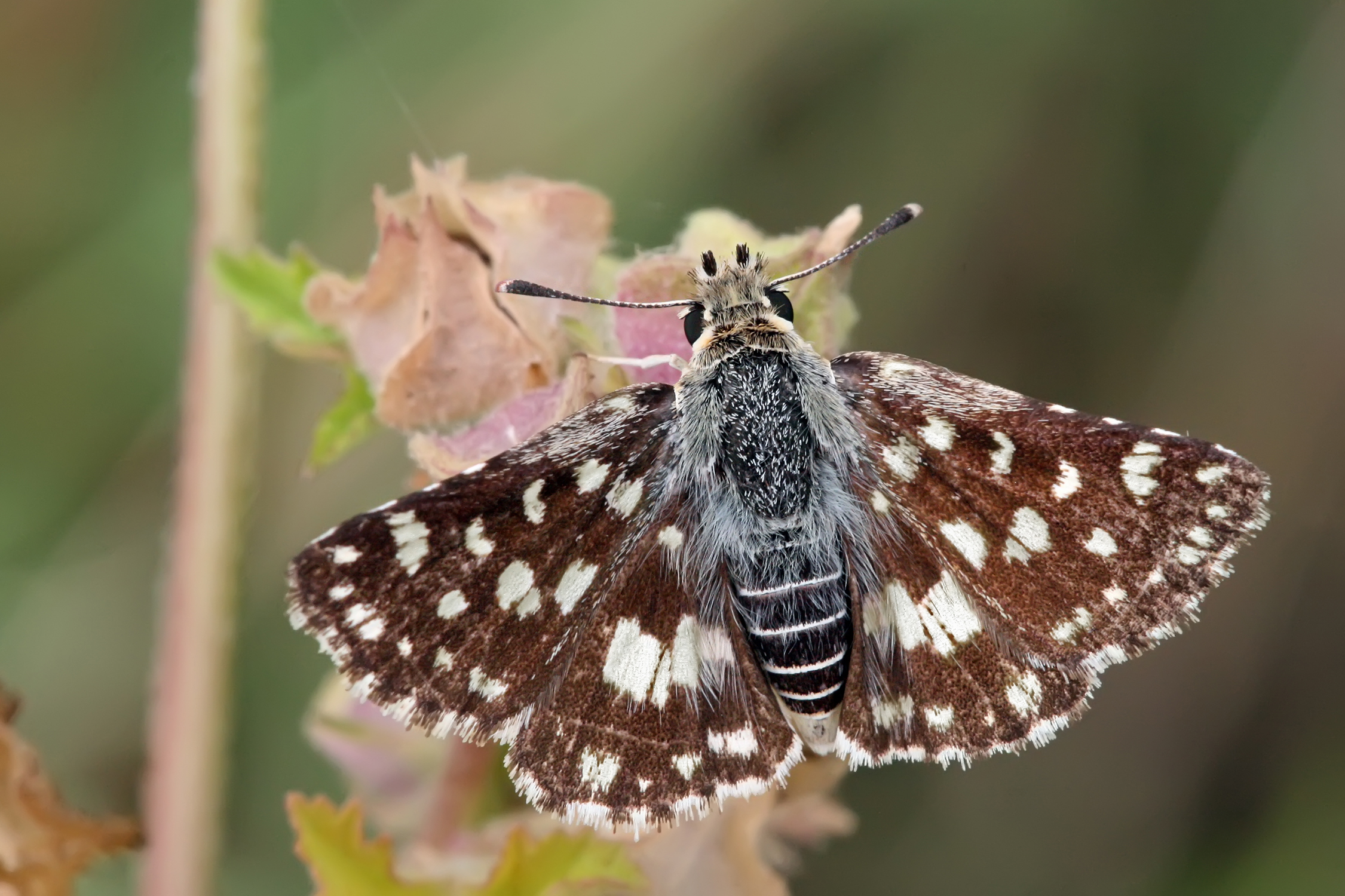
- Spialia mafa in the Ngorongoro Crater, Tanzania

Scientific classification
- Kingdom: Animalia
- Phylum: Arthropoda
- Class: Insecta
- Order: Lepidoptera
- Family: Hesperiidae
- Tribe: Carcharodini
- Genus: Spialia; Swinhoe, 1912

= Spialia =

Genus of butterflies

Spialia is a genus of skippers in the family Hesperiidae, which are mainly found in Africa and Asia. They are commonly called grizzled skippers or sandmen.

As a result of genomic research published in 2020, 3 species of Spialia were moved to the new genus Agyllia and 14 species were moved to the new genus Ernsta.

== Species ==
These species belong to the genus Spialia:

- Spialia ali Oberthür, 1881
- Spialia carnea (Reverdin, 1927)
- Spialia diomus (Hopffer, 1855) (common sandman)
- Spialia doris (Walker, 1870) (desert grizzled skipper)
- Spialia ferax (Wallengren, 1863) (ferax grizzled skipper)
- Spialia fetida Zhdanko, 1992
- Spialia galba (Fabricius, 1793) (indian skipper)
- Spialia geron (Watson, 1893)
- Spialia irida Zhdanko, 1993
- Spialia lugens (Staudinger, 1886)
- Spialia mafa (Trimen, 1870) (mafa sandman)
- Spialia orbifer (Hübner, 1823) (orbed red-underwing skipper)
- Spialia osthelderi (Pfeiffer, 1932)
- Spialia phlomidis (Herrich-Schäffer, 1845) (persian skipper)
- Spialia rosae Hernández-Roldán, Dapporto, Dinca, Vicente & Vila, 2016
- Spialia sertorius (Hoffmannsegg, 1804) (red-underwing skipper)
- Spialia spio (Linnaeus, 1764) (mountain sandman)
- Spialia struvei (Püngeler, 1914)
- Spialia therapne (Rambur, 1832) (corsican red-underwing skipper)
