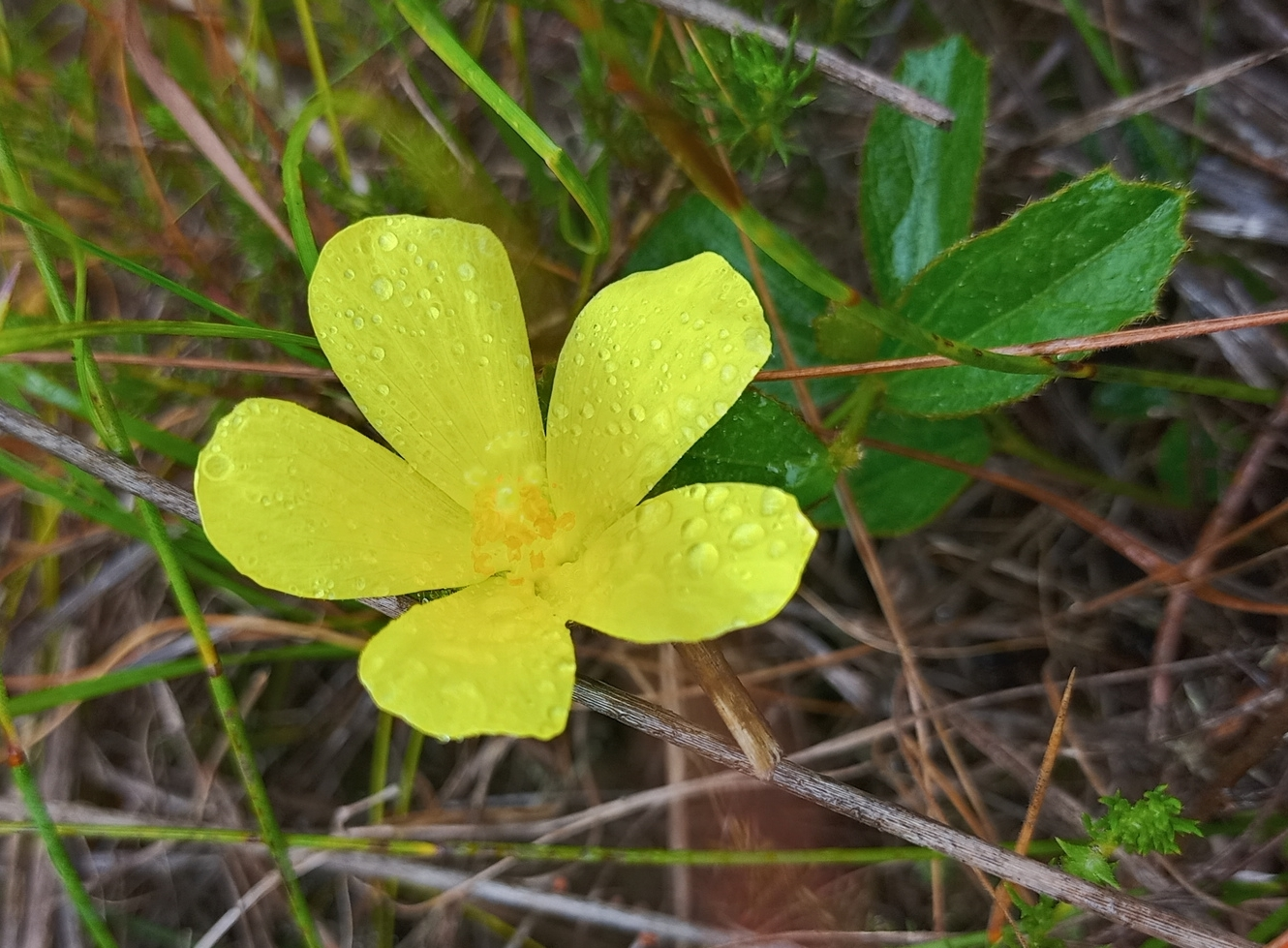

Scientific classification
- Kingdom: Plantae
- Clade: Tracheophytes
- Clade: Angiosperms
- Clade: Eudicots
- Clade: Rosids
- Order: Malvales
- Family: Malvaceae
- Genus: Hibiscus
- Species: H. aethiopicus

Binomial name
- Hibiscus aethiopicus L. (1771)

= Hibiscus aethiopicus =

Species of flowering plant

Hibiscus aethiopicus is a small, prostrate to semi-erect herbaceous perennial in the family Malvaceae, indigenous to eastern and southern Africa.

The flowers can be pale yellow to white (rarely pinkish), usually without a dark centre. The epicalyx has 10 to 12 narrow fringed bracts. The leaves are hairy and elliptic-to-oval in shape.

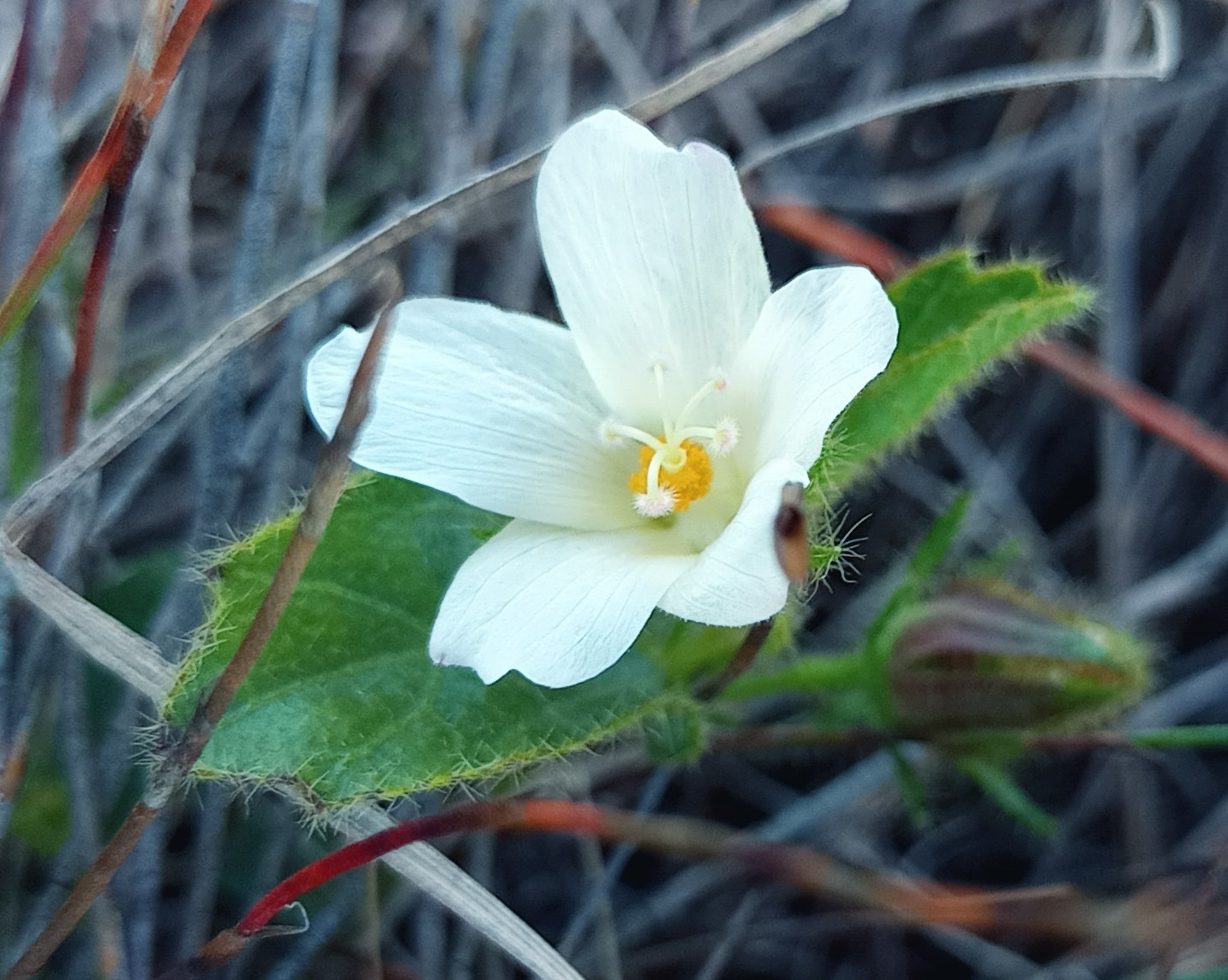
White form of Hibiscus aethiopicus, Western Cape, South Africa.

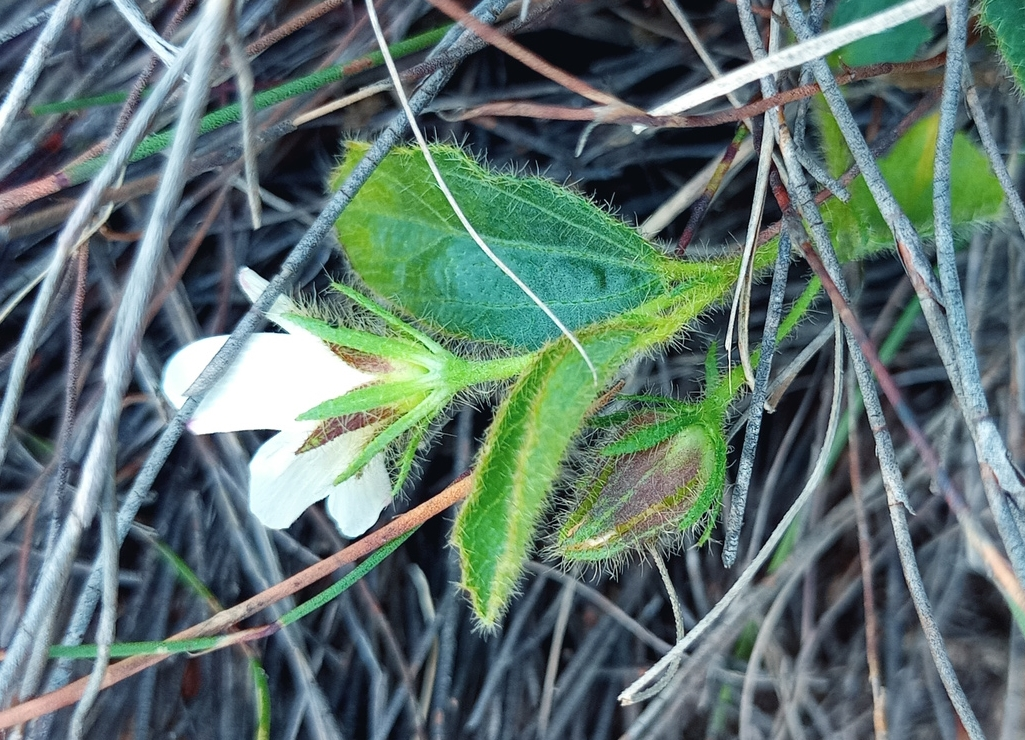
View of calyx base and bracts.
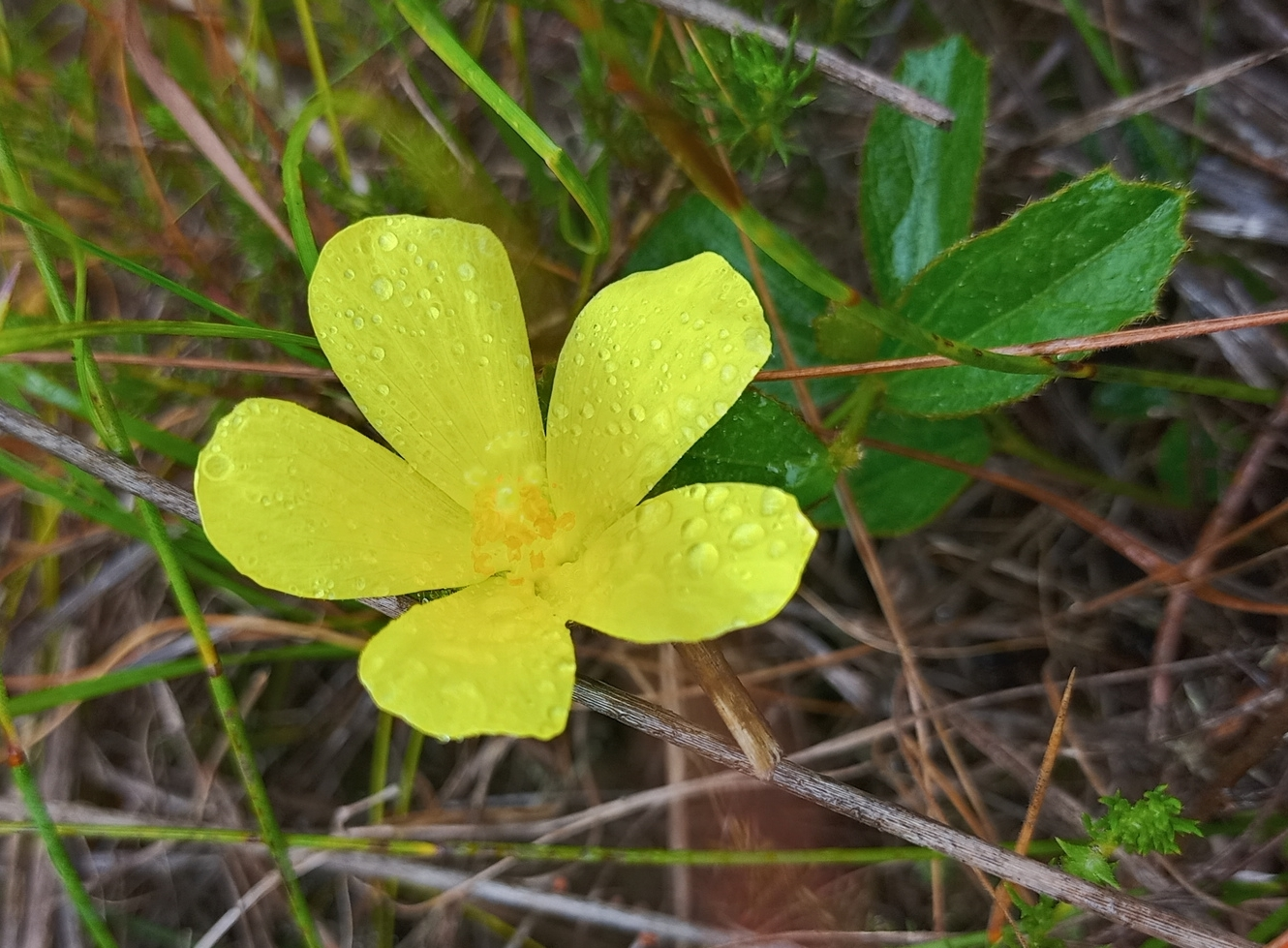
Yellow form of Hibiscus aethiopicus, Western Cape, South Africa.

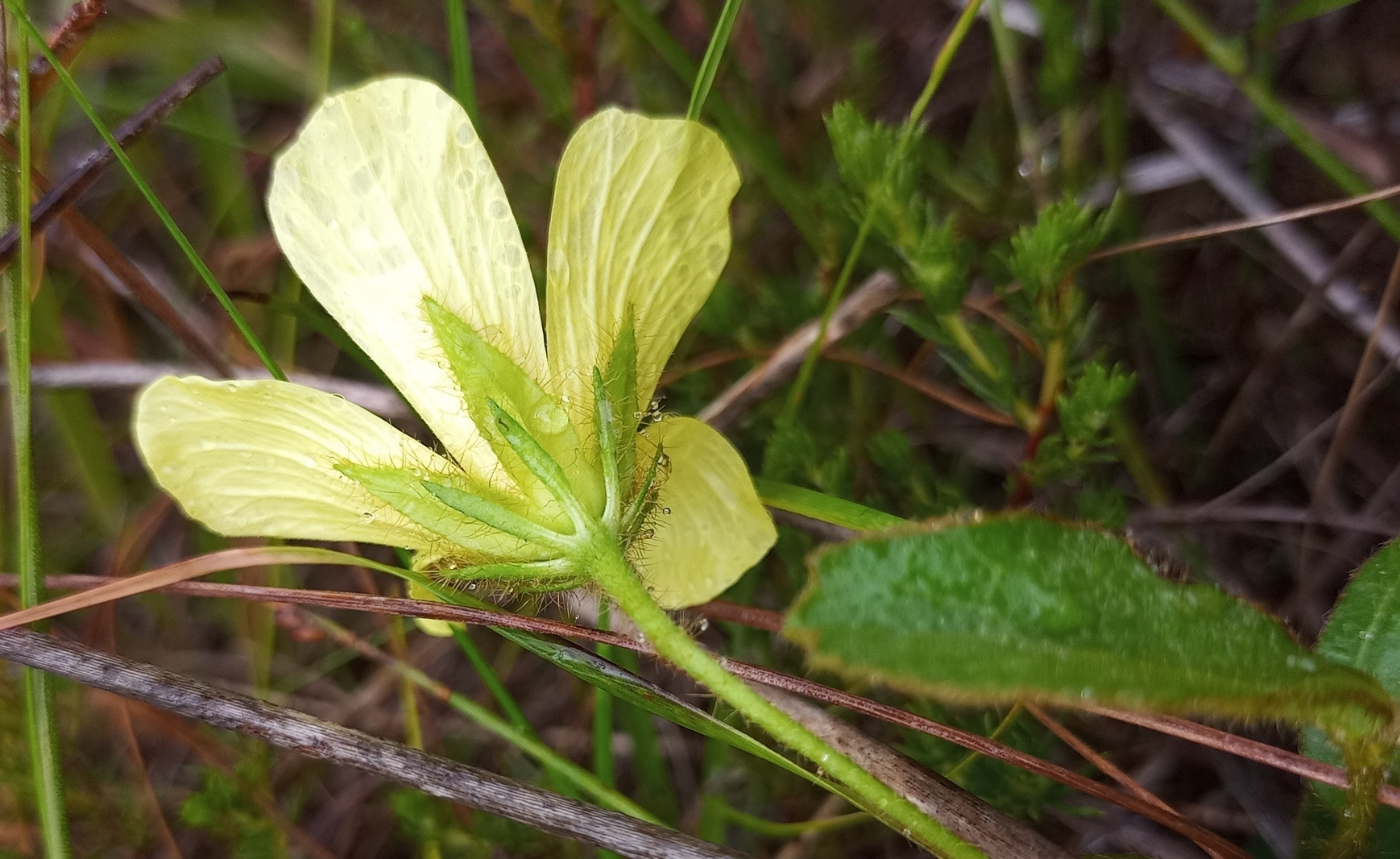
View of calyx base and bracts.
