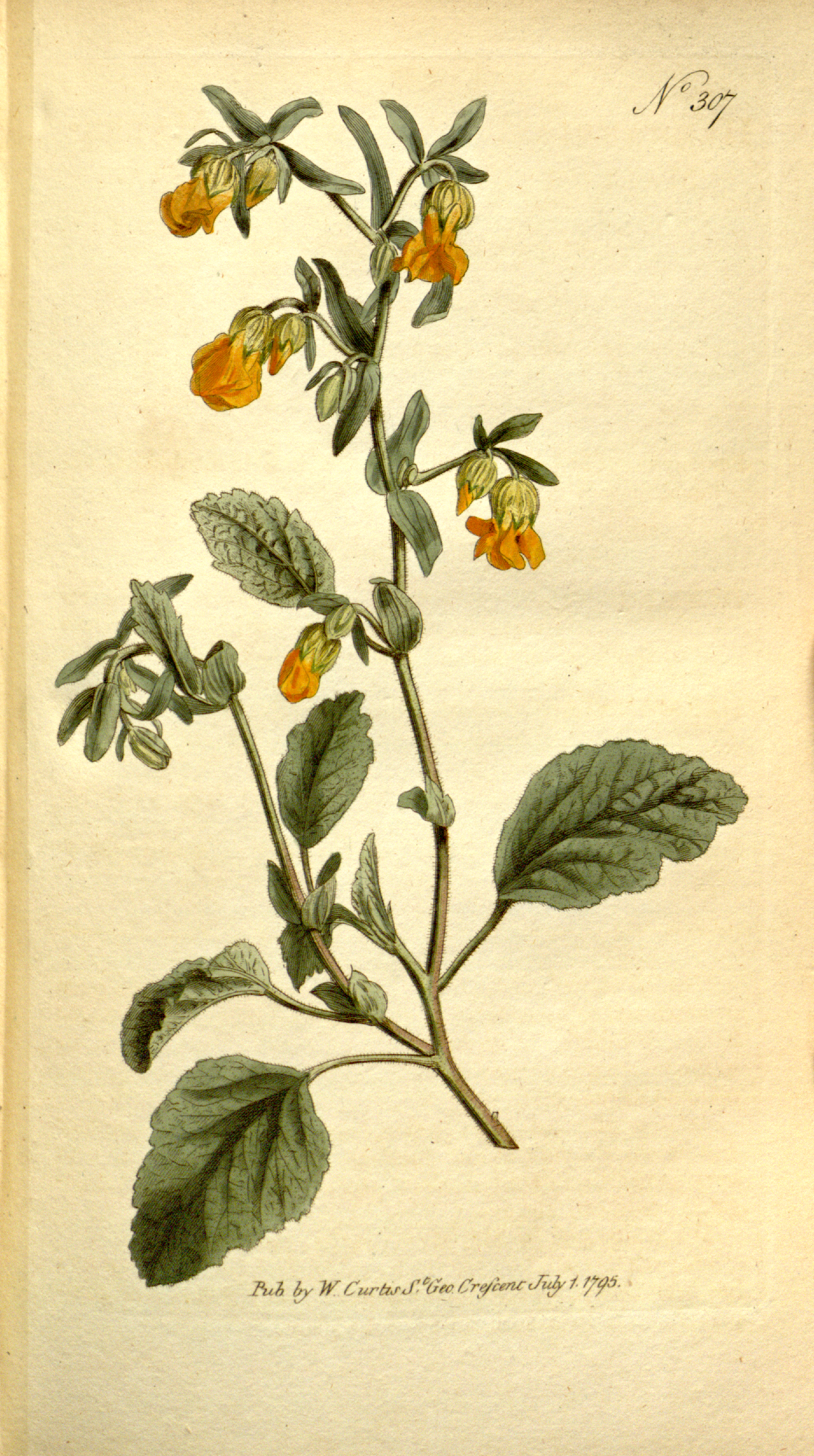
- Hermannia althaeifolia, from The Botanical Magazine, Volume 9

Scientific classification
- Kingdom: Plantae
- Clade: Embryophytes
- Clade: Tracheophytes
- Clade: Angiosperms
- Clade: Eudicots
- Clade: Rosids
- Order: Malvales
- Family: Malvaceae
- Subfamily: Byttnerioideae
- Tribe: Hermannieae
- Genus: Hermannia; L. (1753)

Species
- See text.

Synonyms
- Eurynema Endl.; Mahernia L. (Note: Mahernia is an imperfect taxonomic anagram of Hermannia.); Trichanthera Ehrenb.

= Hermannia =

Genus of flowering plants in the mallow family

Hermannia is a genus of flowering plants in the mallow family, Malvaceae. It includes 170 species.

The genus commemorates Prof. Paul Hermann (1646-1695), a German professor of botany at Leyden and one of the first collectors to visit the Cape.

The genus has a large number of species, each with very limited distribution, but they are generally common and not threatened, with little interest shown in them for horticulture or medicine.

Their distribution ranges across Southern Africa, the vast majority of species being endemic. They are also found in Madagascar and in tropical East Africa to North East Africa and Arabia. A single species, Hermannia tigrensis, is found in western, southern and North-East Africa. Three species are found in northern Mexico and adjacent regions of the United States, one species in southern Mexico, and one in Australia. Hermannia's greatest diversity is found in the Western and Northern Cape, and Namibia.

== Species ==
170 species are accepted.

- Hermannia abrotanoides Schrad.
- Hermannia affinis K.Schum. ex Schinz
- Hermannia alhiensis K.Schum.
- Hermannia alnifolia L.
- Hermannia althaeifolia L.
- Hermannia althaeoides Link
- Hermannia amabilis Marloth ex K.Schum.
- Hermannia amoena Dinter ex Friedr.-Holzh.
- Hermannia angularis Jacq.
- Hermannia antonii I.Verd.
- Hermannia argillicola Dinter ex Friedr.-Holzh.
- Hermannia aspera J.C.Wendl.
- Hermannia auricoma K. Schum.
- Hermannia bicolor Dinter & Engl.
- Hermannia boraginiflora Hook.
- Hermannia boranensis K.Schum.
- Hermannia brachymalla K.Schum.
- Hermannia brachypetala Harv.
- Hermannia bryoniifolia Burch.
- Hermannia burchellii Verd.
- Hermannia burkei Burtt Davy
- Hermannia cernua Thunb.
- Hermannia coccocarpa Kuntze
- Hermannia comosa Burch. ex DC.
- Hermannia complicata Engl.
- Hermannia concinnifolia I.Verd.
- Hermannia confusa T.M.Salter
- Hermannia conglomerata Eckl. & Zeyh.
- Hermannia cordata (E.Mey. ex E.Phillips) De Winter
- Hermannia cordifolia Harv.
- Hermannia cristata Bolus
- Hermannia cuneifolia Jacq.
- Hermannia damarana Baker f.
- Hermannia decipiens E.Mey. ex Harv.
- Hermannia decumbens Willd. ex Spreng.
- Hermannia denudata L.f.
- Hermannia depressa N.E.Br.
- Hermannia desertorum Eckl. & Zeyh.
- Hermannia dichroma T.M.Salter
- Hermannia diffusa L.f.
- Hermannia disermifolia Jacq.
- Hermannia disticha Schrad.
- Hermannia diversistipula C.Presl
- Hermannia eenii Baker
- Hermannia elliottiana K. Schum.
- Hermannia engleri Schinz
- Hermannia erlangeriana K.Schum.
- Hermannia ernesti-ruschii Dinter ex Friedr.-Holzh.
- Hermannia erodioides Kuntze
- Hermannia exappendiculata (Mast.) K. Schum.
- Hermannia filifolia L.f.
- Hermannia fischeri K.Schum.
- Hermannia flammea Jacq.
- Hermannia flammula Harv.
- Hermannia floribunda Harv.
- Hermannia fruticulosa K.Schum. ex Schinz
- Hermannia gariepina Eckl. & Zeyh.
- Hermannia geniculata Eckl. & Zeyh.
- Hermannia gerrardii Harv.
- Hermannia glabrata L.f.
- Hermannia glanduligera K.Schum. ex Schinz
- Hermannia glandulossisima Engl.
- Hermannia gracilis Eckl. & Zeyh.
- Hermannia grandiflora W.T.Aiton
- Hermannia grandifolia N.E.Br.
- Hermannia grandistipula (Buching. ex Harv.) K. Schum.
- Hermannia grisea Schinz
- Hermannia grossularifolia L.
- Hermannia guerkeana K.Schum.
- Hermannia helianthemum K.Schum.
- Hermannia helicoidea I.Verd.
- Hermannia heterophylla Thunb.
- Hermannia hispidula Rchb.
- Hermannia holosericea Jacq.
- Hermannia hyssopifolia L.
- Hermannia incana Cav.
- Hermannia inflata Link & Otto
- Hermannia involucrata Cav.
- Hermannia jacobeifolia (Turcz.) R.A.Dyer
- Hermannia johanssenii N.E.Br.
- Hermannia johnstonii Exell & Mendonça
- Hermannia joubertiana Harv.
- Hermannia juttae Dinter & Engl.
- Hermannia kirkii Mast.
- Hermannia lacera (E.Mey. ex Harv.) Fourc.
- Hermannia lancifolia Szyszyl.
- Hermannia lavandulifolia L.
- Hermannia leucantha Schltr.
- Hermannia linearifolia Harv.
- Hermannia linifolia Burm.f.
- Hermannia linnaeoides (Burch. ex DC.) K.Schum.
- Hermannia litoralis I.Verd.
- Hermannia longiramosa Engl.
- Hermannia macra Schltr.
- Hermannia macrobotrys K.Schum.
- Hermannia malvifolia N.E.Br.
- Hermannia merxmuelleri Friedr.-Holzh.
- Hermannia micrantha Adamson
- Hermannia micropetala Harv.
- Hermannia minimifolia Friedr.-Holzh.
- Hermannia minutiflora Engl.
- Hermannia modesta (Ehrenb.) Mast.
- Hermannia montana N.E. Br.
- Hermannia mucronulata Turcz.
- Hermannia muirii Pillans
- Hermannia multiflora Jacq.
- Hermannia muricata Eckl. & Zeyh.
- Hermannia oblongifolia Hochr.
- Hermannia odorata Aiton
- Hermannia oligosperma K.Schum.
- Hermannia oliveri K.Schum.
- Hermannia palmeri Rose
- Hermannia paniculata Franch.
- Hermannia parviflora Eckl. & Zeyh.
- Hermannia parvula Burtt Davy
- Hermannia pauciflora S. Watson
- Hermannia paucifolia Turcz.
- Hermannia pearsonii Exell & Mendonça
- Hermannia pfeilii K. Schum.
- Hermannia pillansii Compton
- Hermannia pinnata L.
- Hermannia prismatocarpa E.Mey. ex Harv.
- Hermannia procumbens Cav.
- Hermannia pseudathiensis Cheek
- Hermannia pseudofischeri Cheek
- Hermannia pulchella L.f.
- Hermannia pulverata Andrews
- Hermannia quartiniana A.Rich.
- Hermannia repetenda Verd.
- Hermannia rigida Harv.
- Hermannia rudis N.E.Br.
- Hermannia rugosa Adamson
- Hermannia saccifera (Turcz.) K.Schum.
- Hermannia salviifolia L.f.
- Hermannia sandersonii Harv.
- Hermannia scabra Cav.
- Hermannia scabricaulis T.M.Salter
- Hermannia schlechteriana Schinz ex K.Schum.
- Hermannia scordifolia Jacq.
- Hermannia seineri Engl.
- Hermannia setosa Schinz
- Hermannia sisymbriifolia Hochr.
- Hermannia solaniflora K.Schum.
- Hermannia spinosa E. Meyer ex Harvey
- Hermannia staurostemon K.Schum.
- Hermannia stellulata K. Schum.
- Hermannia stipitata Pillans
- Hermannia stipulacea Lehm. ex Eckl. & Zeyh.
- Hermannia stricta (E.Mey. ex Turcz.) Harv.
- Hermannia suavis C.Presl
- Hermannia sulcata Harv.
- Hermannia ternifolia C.Presl ex Harv.
- Hermannia testacea Vollesen
- Hermannia texana A. Gray
- Hermannia tigrensis Hochst. ex A.Rich.
- Hermannia torrei Wild
- Hermannia transvaalensis Schinz
- Hermannia trifoliata L.
- Hermannia trifurca L.
- Hermannia uhligii Engl.
- Hermannia umbratica I.Verd.
- Hermannia velutina DC.
- Hermannia veronicifolia (Eckl. & Zeyh.) K.Schum.
- Hermannia vestita Thunb.
- Hermannia violacea K. Schum.
- Hermannia viscosa Hiern
- Hermannia volkensii K.Schum.
- Hermannia vollesenii Cheek
- Hermannia waltherioides K.Schum.
- Hermannia woodii Schinz
