= List of butterflies of Tunisia =

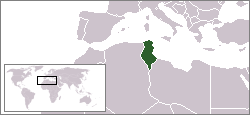
Location of Tunisia

This is a list of butterflies of Tunisia. About 84 species are known from Tunisia.

== Hesperiidae ==
- Carcharodus lavatherae
- Carcharodus stauderi
- Carcharodus tripolina
- Gegenes nostrodamus
- Gegenes pumilio
- Spialia sertorius
- Thymelicus acteon
- Thymelicus hamza

== Papilionidae ==
- Iphiclides podalirius
- Papilio machaon
- Papilio saharae
- Zerynthia rumina

== Pieridae ==
- Anthocharis euphenoides
- Aporia crataegi
- Colias croceus
- Colotis chrysonome
- Colotis evagore
- Euchloe ausonia
- Euchloe belemia
- Euchloe charlonia
- Euchloe falloui
- Gonepteryx cleopatra
- Gonepteryx rhamni
- Pieris brassicae
- Pieris napi
- Pieris rapae
- Pontia daplidice
- Pontia glauconome

== Lycaenidae ==
- Aricia cramera
- Azanus ubaldus
- Callophrys avis
- Callophrys rubi
- Celastrina argiolus
- Cigaritis myrmecophila
- Cigaritis siphax
- Cigaritis zohra
- Glaucopsyche alexis
- Glaucopsyche melanops
- Kretania allardii
- Kretania martini
- Lampides boeticus
- Leptotes pirithous
- Lycaena phlaeas
- Lysandra punctifera
- Polyommatus icarus
- Pseudophilotes abencerragus
- Satyrium esculi
- Tarucus rosacea
- Tarucus theophrastus
- Tomares ballus
- Tomares mauretanicus
- Virachola livia
- Zizeeria karsandra

== Nymphalidae ==
- Argynnis pandora
- Berberia abdelkader
- Berberia lambessanus
- Charaxes jasius
- Chazara briseis
- Coenonympha arcanioides
- Coenonympha fettigii
- Coenonympha pamphilus
- Danaus chrysippus
- Hipparchia aristaeus
- Hipparchia ellena
- Hipparchia fidia
- Hipparchia hansii
- Hipparchia statilinus
- Issoria lathonia
- Lasiommata megera
- Libythea celtis
- Maniola jurtina
- Melanargia galathea
- Melanargia ines
- Melitaea aetherie
- Melitaea deserticola
- Melitaea didyma
- Nymphalis polychloros
- Pararge aegeria
- Polygonia c-album
- Pyronia bathseba
- Pyronia cecilia
- Pyronia janiroides
- Vanessa atalanta
- Vanessa cardui

== See also ==
- Wildlife of Tunisia
