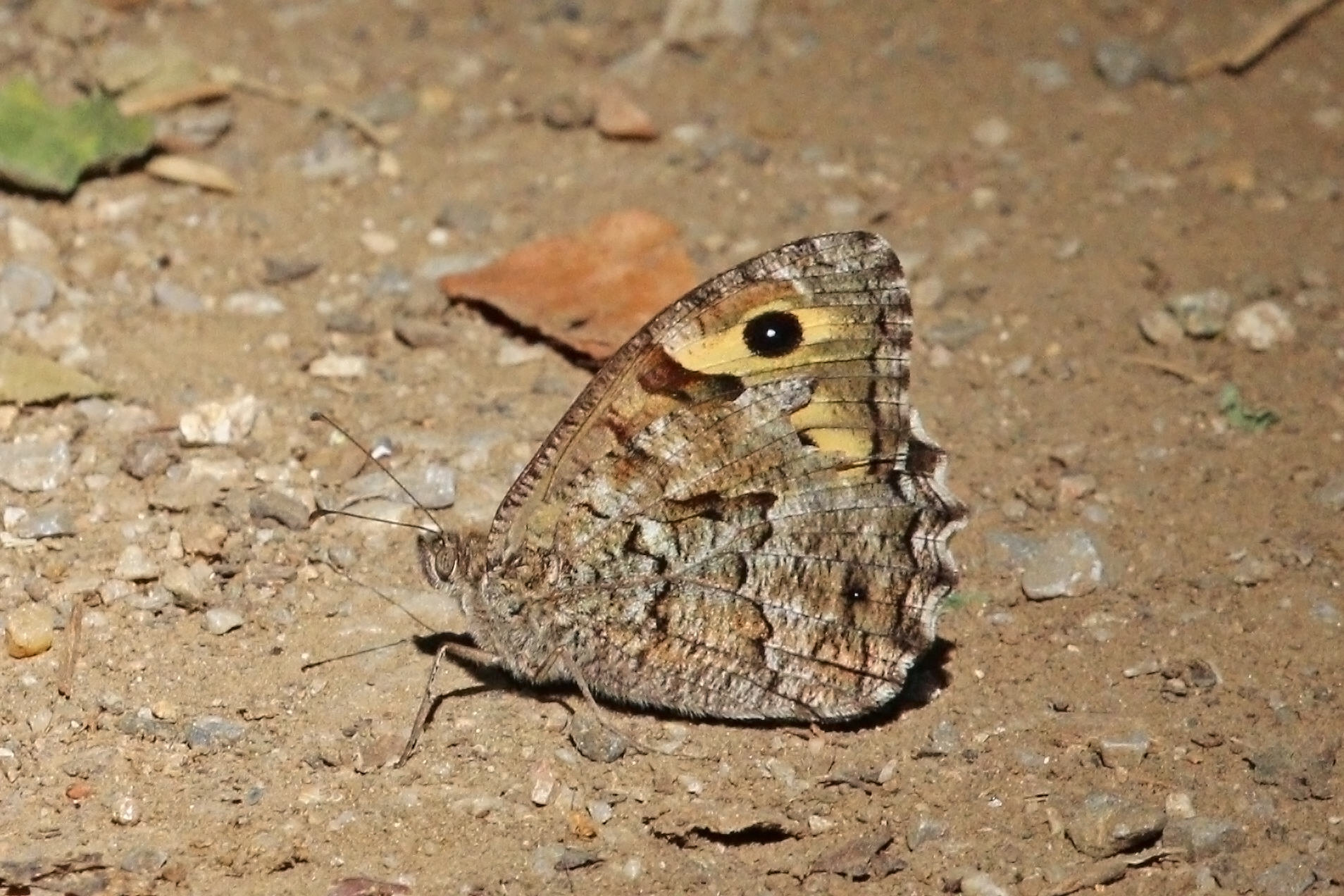
- Balkan grayling H. senthes in North Macedonia
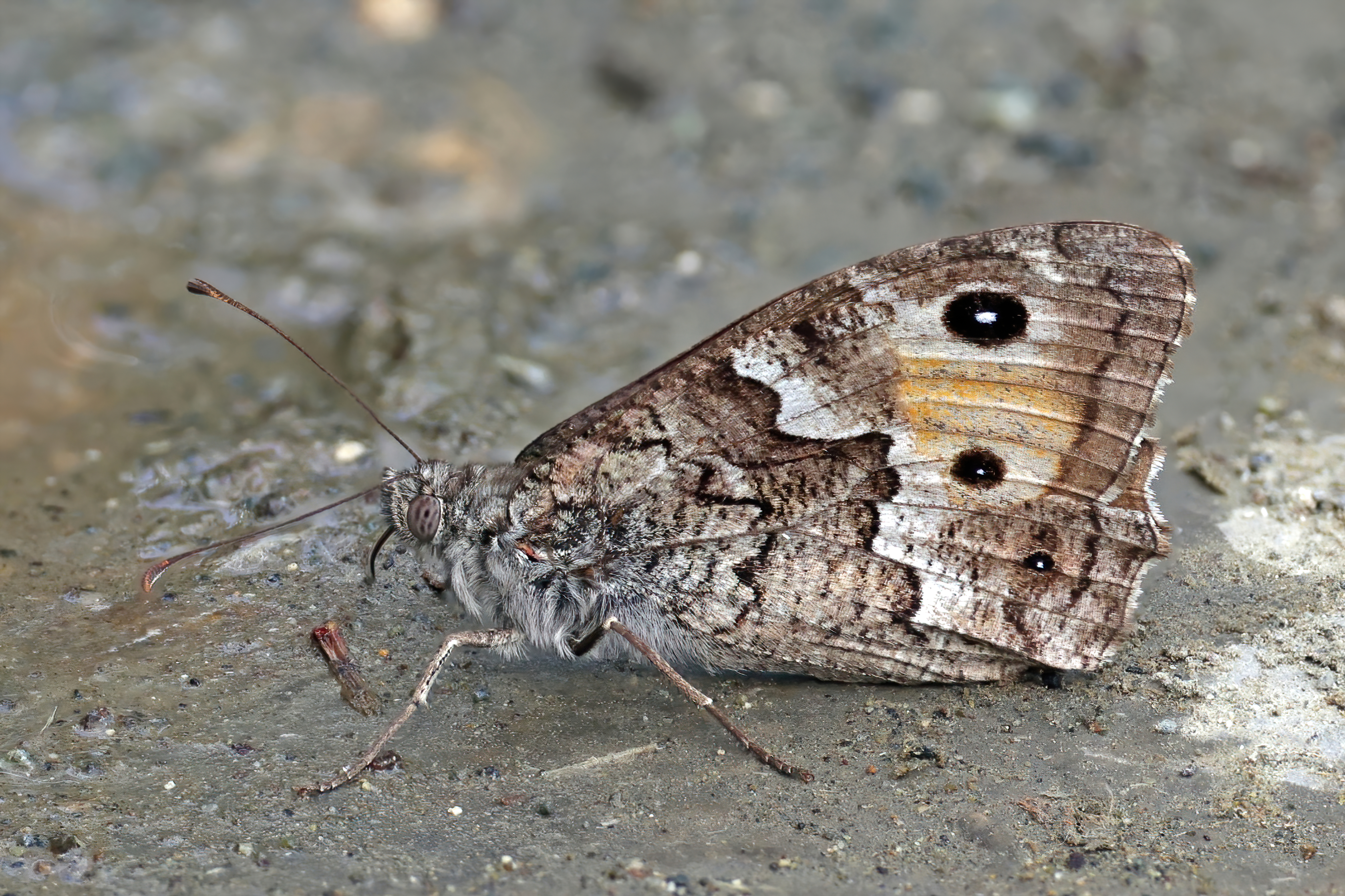
- Cyprus grayling H. cypriensis in Cyprus

Scientific classification
- Kingdom: Animalia
- Phylum: Arthropoda
- Class: Insecta
- Order: Lepidoptera
- Family: Nymphalidae
- Subtribe: Satyrina
- Genus: Hipparchia; Fabricius, 1807

Synonyms
- Eumenis Hübner, [1819]; Nytha Billberg, 1820; Melania Sodoffsky, 1837 (preocc.); Pseudotergumia Agenjo, 1947; Neohipparchia de Lesse, 1951; Parahipparchia Kudrna, 1977; Euhipparchia Kudrna, 1977

= Hipparchia (butterfly) =

Genus of butterflies

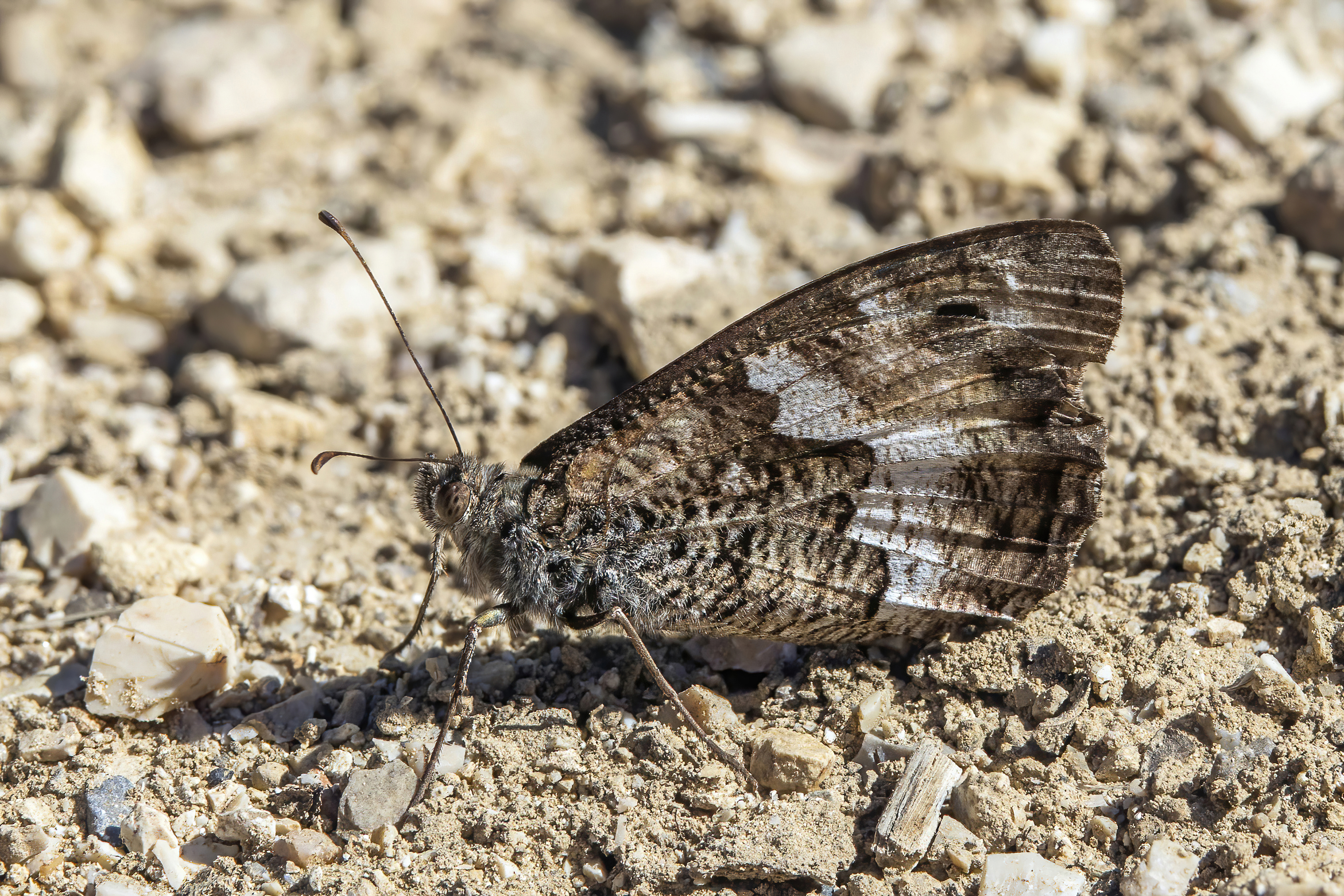
Delattin's grayling (H. volgensis) on Corfu

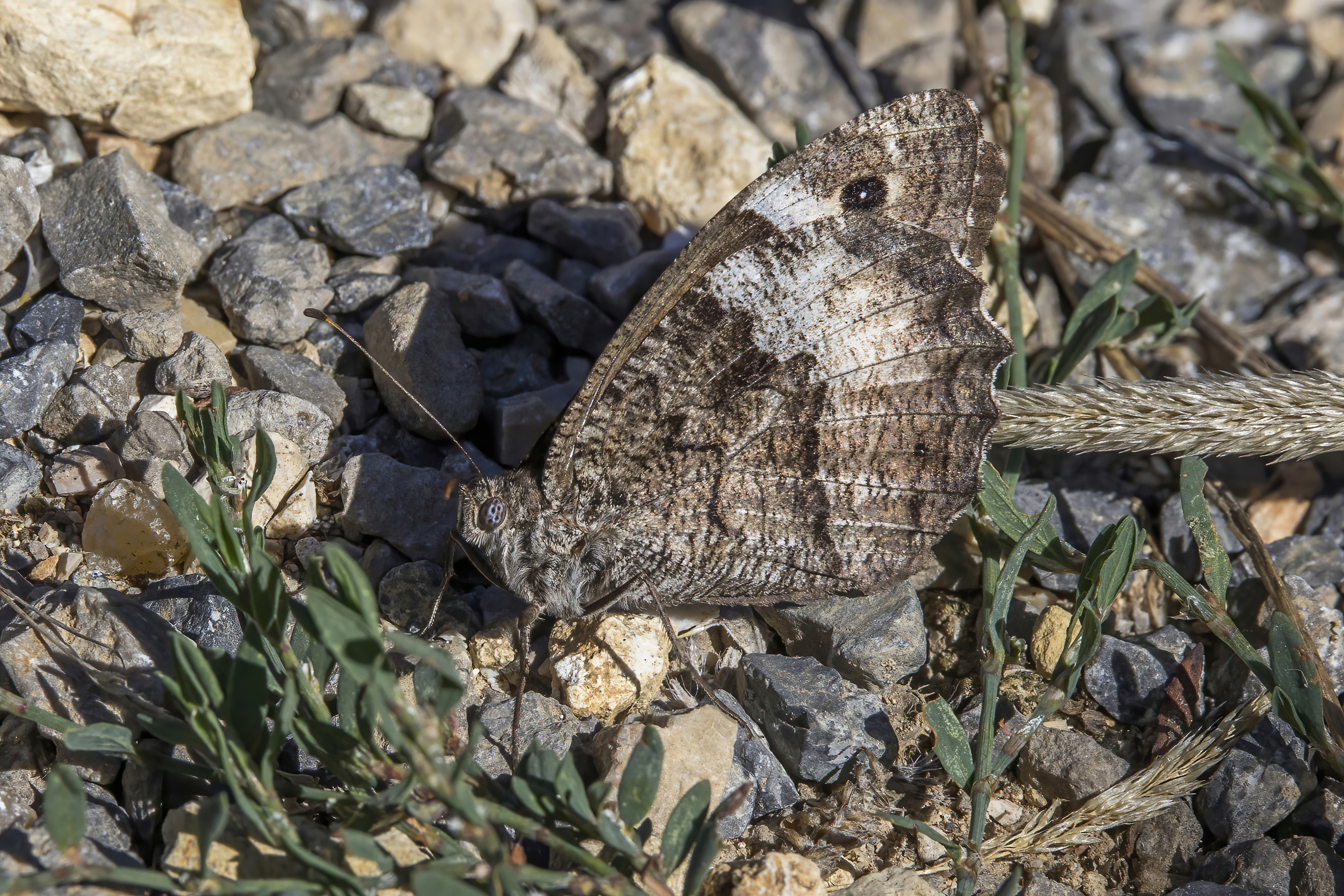
Eastern rock grayling (H. syriaca) on Corfu

Hipparchia is a genus of butterflies within the family Nymphalidae. The genus was erected by Johan Christian Fabricius in 1807.

== Species ==
- Hipparchia alcyone (Denis and Schiffermüller, 1775) – rock grayling
  - Hipparchia alcyone caroli (Rothschild, 1933) (Morocco) may be a full species Hipparchia ellena caroli
  - Hipparchia alcyone genava may be a full species Hipparchia genava Fruhstorfer, 1907 (Switzerland)
- Hipparchia aristaeus (Bonelli, 1826) – southern grayling – (North Africa, Asia Minor, southern Europe
- Hipparchia algirica or Hipparchia aristaeus algirica (Oberthür, 1876)
  - Hipparchia aristaeus algirica (Oberthür, 1876) (Morocco, Algeria, Tunisia)
  - Hipparchia aristaeus aristaeus (Corsica, Sardinia)
  - Hipparchia aristaeus blachieri (Sicily)
- Hipparchia autonoe (Esper, 1784) (southeastern Europe to northern Caucasus, southern Siberia, Amur, Korea, Tibet, northwestern China)
  - Hipparchia autonoe maxima Bang-Haas
  - Hipparchia autonoe orchomenus (Fruhstorfer, 1911) (Tibet)
  - Hipparchia autonoe sibirica (Staudinger, 1861) (Siberia)
  - Hipparchia autonoe wutaiensis Murayama
- Hipparchia azorina (Strecker, 1899) – Azores grayling – (Azores)
- Hipparchia caldeirensis (Oehmig (1981)
- Hipparchia bacchus Higgins, 1967
- Hipparchia blachieri (Frühstorfer, 1908)
- Hipparchia christenseni Kudrna, 1977 (Greece)
- Hipparchia cretica (Rebel, 1916) (Crete)
- Hipparchia cypriensis (Holik, 1949) (Cyprus)
- Hipparchia delattini Kudrna, 1975 (North Macedonia, northwestern Greece)
- Hipparchia ellena (Oberthür, 1894) (North Africa)
  - Hipparchia ellena caroli (Rothschild, 1933) (Morocco)
- Hipparchia fagi (Scopoli, 1763) – woodland grayling – (central Europe, southern Russia)
  - Hipparchia fagi tetrica Fruhstorfer, 1907
- Hipparchia fatua (Freyer, 1844) – Freyer's grayling – (Asia Minor)
  - Hipparchia fatua klapperichi (Gross & Ebert, 1975)
  - Hipparchia fatua persiscana (Verity, 1937) (Armenia)
- Hipparchia fidia (Linnaeus, 1767) – striped grayling – (North Africa, southwestern Europe)
  - Hipparchia fidia fidia
- Hipparchia genava Fruhstorfer, 1907 – lesser rock grayling
- Hipparchia gomera Higgins, 1967
- Hipparchia hansii (Austaut, 1879) (North Africa)
- Hipparchia hermione (Linnaeus, 1764) (central and southern Europe, North Africa, Asia Minor)
- Hipparchia leighebi Kudrna, 1976 or Hipparchia semele leighebi Kudrna, 1976 Sicily
- Hipparchia maderensis (Bethune-Baker, 1891) – Madeiran grayling – (Madeira)
- Hipparchia mersina (Staudinger, 1871) (Greece)
- Hipparchia miguelensis Le Cerf, 1935
- Hipparchia neapolitana (Stauder, 1921) – Italian grayling – (Italy)
- Hipparchia neomiris (Godart, 1824) – Corsican grayling – (Corsica, Sardinia)
- Hipparchia parisatis (Kollar, 1849) – white-edged rock brown – (Asia)
  - Hipparchia parisatis laeta (Christoph, 1877)
  - Hipparchia parisatis macrophthalma Eversmann, 1851 (Armenia)
  - Hipparchia parisatis xizangensis (Chou, 1994) (Tibet)
- Hipparchia pellucida (Stauder, 1924) or Hipparchia semele pellucida (Asia Minor, southeastern Europe)
- Hipparchia pisidice (Klug, 1832) (Syria, Lebanon)
- Hipparchia powelli (Oberthür, 1910) (Algeria)
- Hipparchia sbordonii Kudrna, 1984 or Hipparchia semele sbordonii Kudrna, 1984 – Ponza grayling – (Pontine Islands)
- Hipparchia semele (Linnaeus, 1758) – grayling – (Europe, southern Russia)
  - Hipparchia semele semele (Europe)
  - Hipparchia semele atlantica (northwestern Scotland)
  - Hipparchia semele cadmus Fruhstorfer, 1908 (mountains of Europe)
  - Hipparchia semele clarensis (Ireland)
  - Hipparchia semele hibernica (Ireland)
  - Hipparchia semele leighebi Kudrna, 1976 or Hipparchia leighebi (Sicily)
  - Hipparchia semele pellucida (Stauder, 1924)
  - Hipparchia semele sbordonii Kudrna, 1984 (Pontine Islands)
  - Hipparchia semele scota (coasts of Scotland)
  - Hipparchia semele thyone
- Hipparchia senthes (Fruhstorfer, 1908) or Hipparchia aristaeus senthes (Albania, North Macedonia, Bulgaria, Greece, Turkey)
- Hipparchia statilinus (Hufnagel, 1766) – tree grayling – (North Africa, Asia Minor southern and central Europe)
  - Hipparchia statilinus statilinus
  - Hipparchia statilinus sylvicola (Austaut, 1880) (North Africa)
- Hipparchia stulta (Staudinger, 1882) (Turkmenistan, Uzbekistan, Tajikistan, Afghanistan)
- Hipparchia syriaca (Staudinger, 1871) (southeastern Europe, Turkey)
- Hipparchia tewfiki (Wiltshire, 1949)
- Hipparchia tilosi (Manil, 1984)
- Hipparchia volgensis (Mazochin-Porshnjakov, 1952) (Asia Minor, southeastern Europe)
- Hipparchia wyssii (Christoph, 1889) (Canary Islands)
