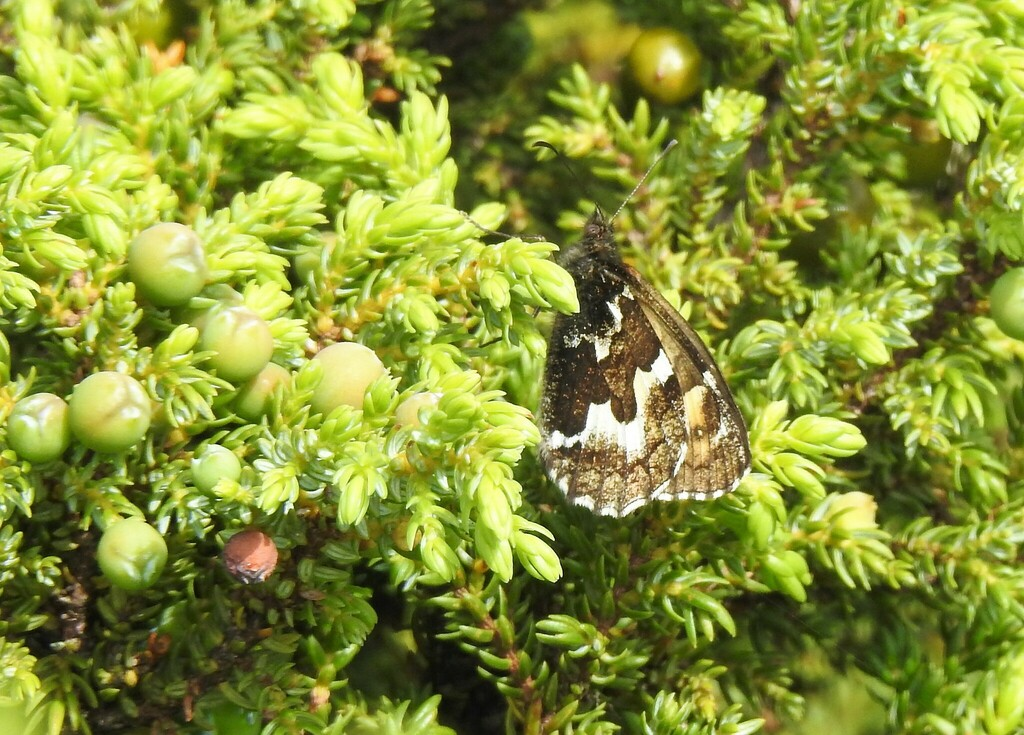

Conservation status
- Near Threatened (IUCN 3.1)

Scientific classification
- Kingdom: Animalia
- Phylum: Arthropoda
- Clade: Pancrustacea
- Class: Insecta
- Order: Lepidoptera
- Family: Nymphalidae
- Genus: Hipparchia
- Species: H. azorina

Binomial name
- Hipparchia azorina (Strecker, 1899)

Synonyms
- Hipparchia occidentalis

= Hipparchia azorina =

Species of butterfly

Hipparchia azorina, the Azores grayling, is a species of butterfly in the family Nymphalidae. It is endemic to the Azores. Its natural habitats are temperate forests and temperate grassland. It is threatened by habitat loss.

== Description in Seitz ==
S. azorinus Streck. This insect, which is unknown to me in nature, is said to be from the Azores.Dark brown; forewing with paler, yellowish, disc and a small apical ocellus; hindwing with an ill-defined yellow middle band which is strongly incurved above the anal angle and beneath the apex. Fringes chequered. Underside of hindwing with a pure white, sharply defined median band, at the basal side of which there are two white spots, one irregular near the base, the second quadrangular- below the cell. Described from a male. This form, which Strecker placed near neomiris, appears to be allied to alcyone.
