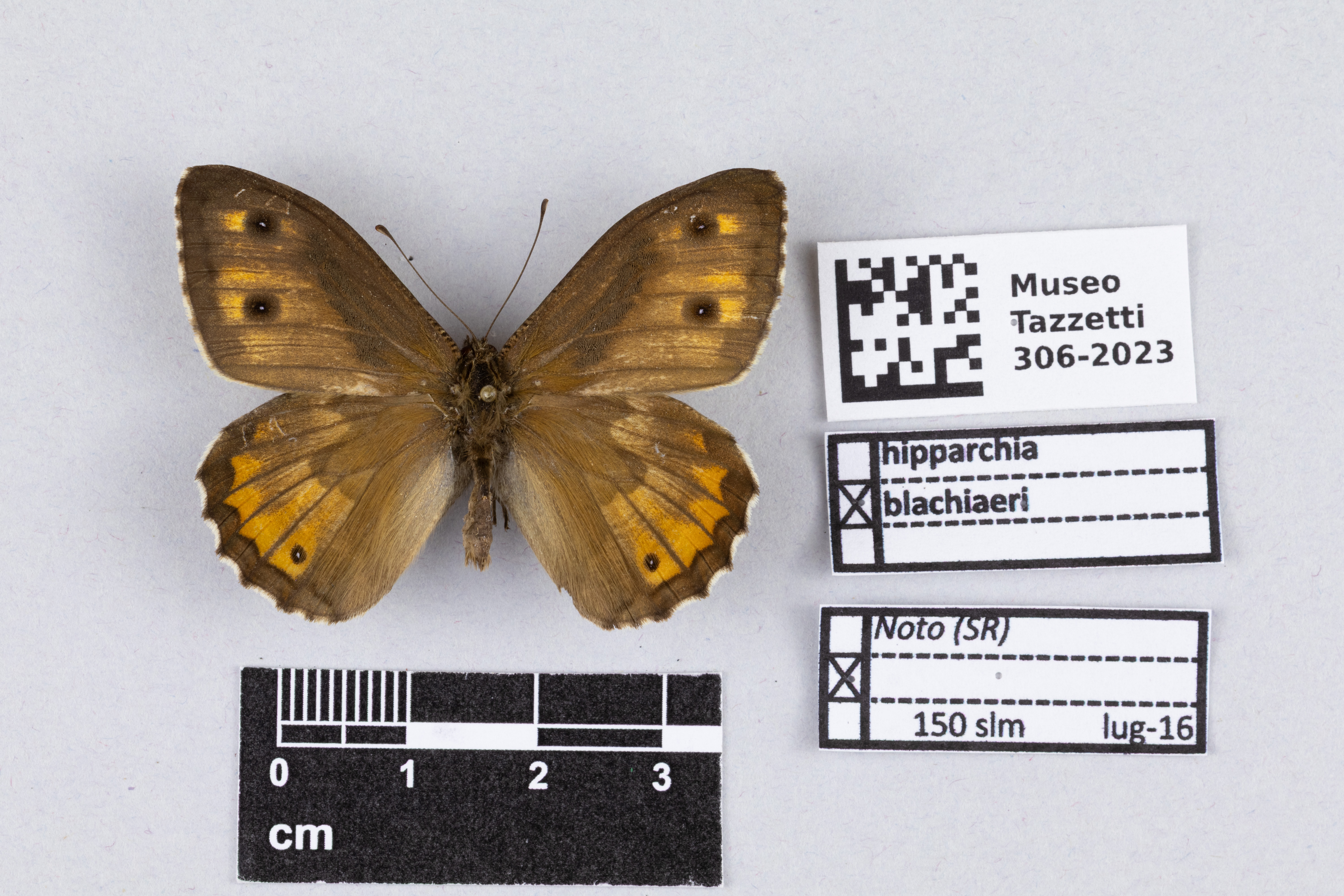

Scientific classification
- Kingdom: Animalia
- Phylum: Arthropoda
- Class: Insecta
- Order: Lepidoptera
- Family: Nymphalidae
- Genus: Hipparchia
- Species: H. blachieri

Binomial name
- Hipparchia blachieri (Frühstorfer, 1908)

Synonyms
- Satyrus semele blachieri Fruhstorfer, 1908; Hipparchia (Parahipparchia) blachieri; Hipparchia vallettai Valletta, 1971; Satyrus siciliana Oberthür, 1915; Hipparchia vallettae Kudrna, 1975

= Hipparchia blachieri =

Species of butterfly

Hipparchia blachieri is a butterfly of the family Nymphalidae. It was described by Hans Fruhstorfer in 1908. It is endemic to Sicily and Malta.

The wingspan is 58–65 mm.

== Taxonomy ==
The species is often treated as a subspecies of Hipparchia neapolitana.
