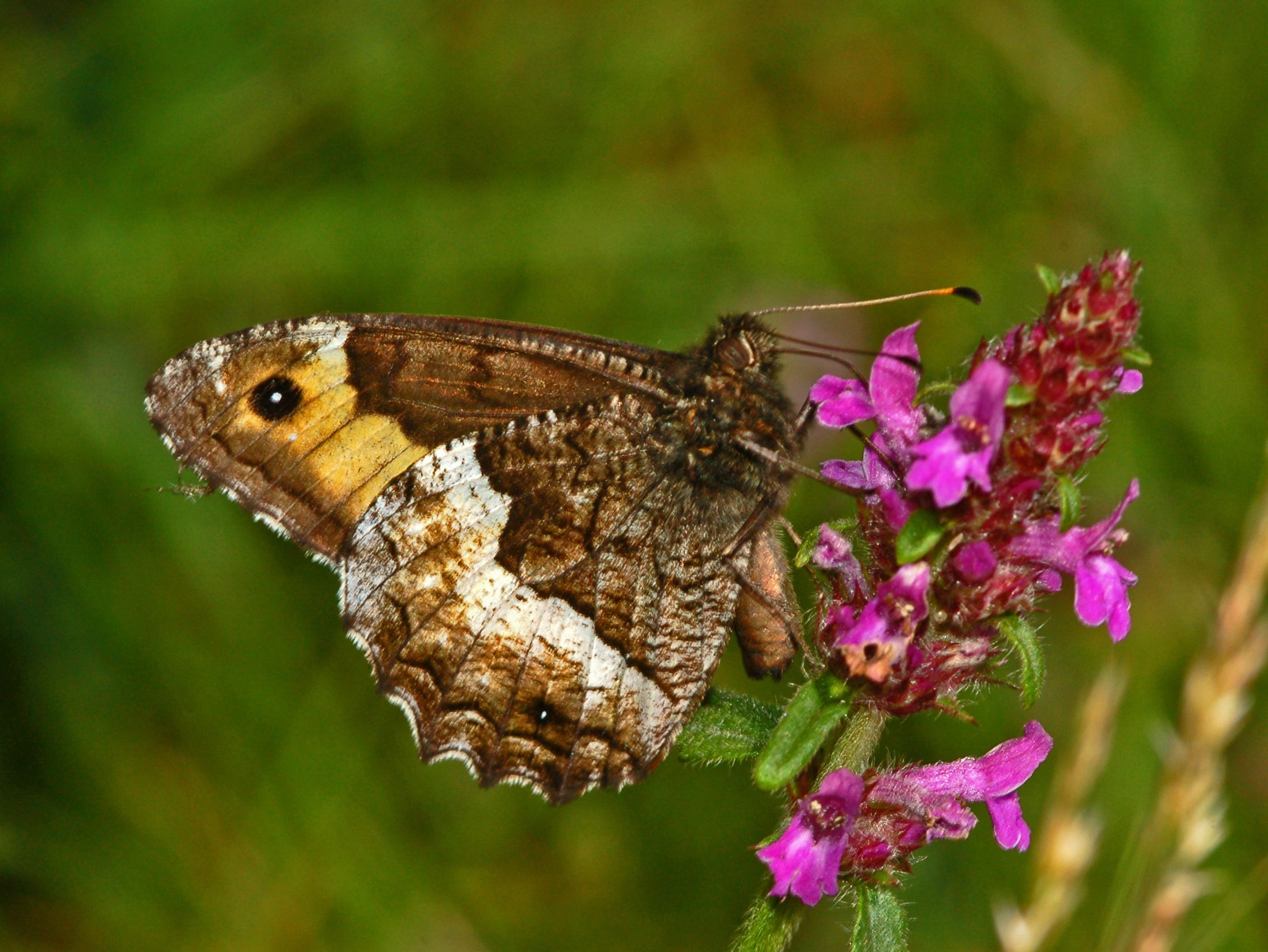

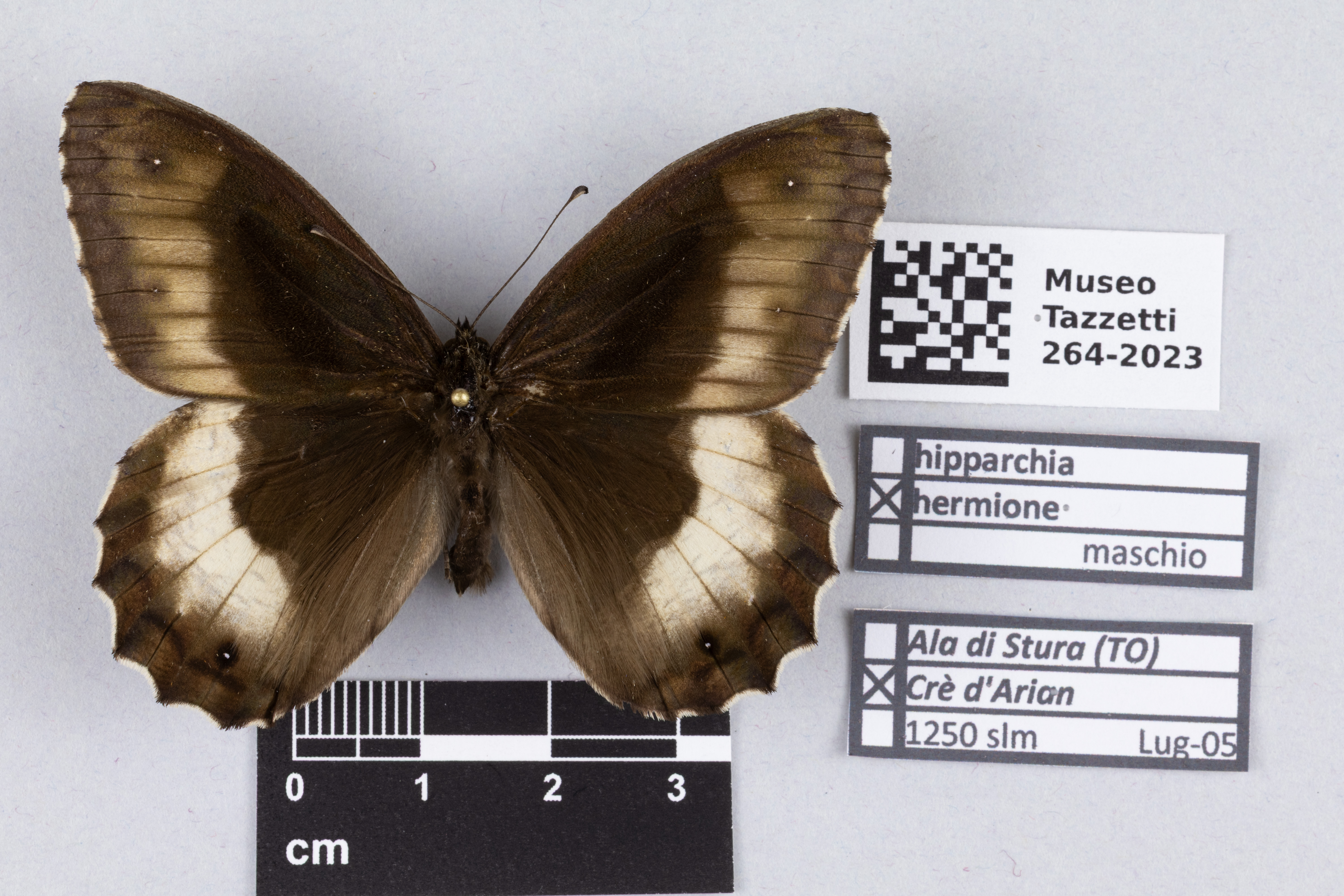
- specimen Museo Tazzetti

Scientific classification
- Kingdom: Animalia
- Phylum: Arthropoda
- Class: Insecta
- Order: Lepidoptera
- Family: Nymphalidae
- Genus: Hipparchia
- Species: H. genava

Binomial name
- Hipparchia genava (Fruhstorfer, 1908)

Synonyms
- Eumenis fagi genava Fruhstorfer, 1908; Hipparchia hermione genava (Fruhstorfer 1908)

= Hipparchia genava =

Species of butterfly

Hipparchia genava, the lesser rock grayling, is a species of butterfly in the family Nymphalidae.

== Taxonomy ==
Some authors consider this species separate from Hipparchia alcyone, mainly on the basis of larval morphology, but doubts are still raised by other authors. Some DNA study should clarify the situation.

== Distribution ==
This species can be found only in Italy, in France (Alps, Massif Central, Jura) and in southwestern Switzerland. However the distribution is poorly known.

== Habitat ==
These butterflies live in open woodland with grass, in dry grassland slopes, in nutrient-poor grasslands and in rocky areas.

== Description ==
Hipparchia genava has a wingspan of about 30 millimetres (1.2 in). The basic color of the upperside of the wings is dark brown, with a large whitish band and a white fringe. The underside of the hindwings shows a large white band with a large indent in the middle. Also the underside of the forewings has a white band, usually with an indent below an apical eyespot.

This species is rather similar to Hipparchia fagi and Hipparchia alcyone. These three species can be separated on the basis of their different distribution or by an inspection of the genitalia of the male. In particular, it is necessary to examine the Jullien's organs, a structure located at the end of the abdomen of the male, close to the genitalia, comprising a series of small black batons. Hipparchia genava have 7-12 black batons. Hipparchia fagi from 2 to 4, Hipparchia alcyone from 15 to 25.

== Biology ==
Adults fly from June to August. The caterpillars feed on grasses (Poaceae) (Festuca ovina, etc.). This species hibernates as a caterpillar. Larvae are mature in May and June.

== Bibliography ==
- LepIndex: The Global Lepidoptera Names Index. Beccaloni G.W., Scoble M.J., Robinson G.S. & Pitkin B.
