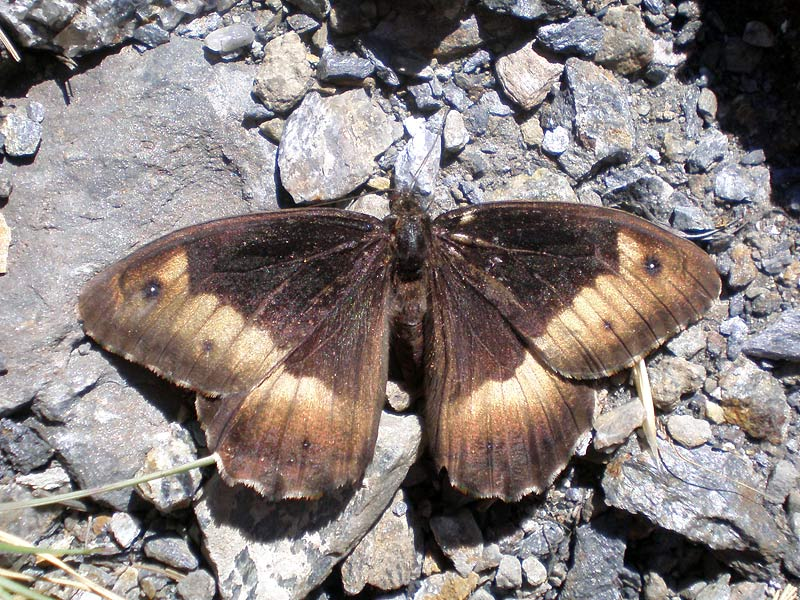
- in Andorra
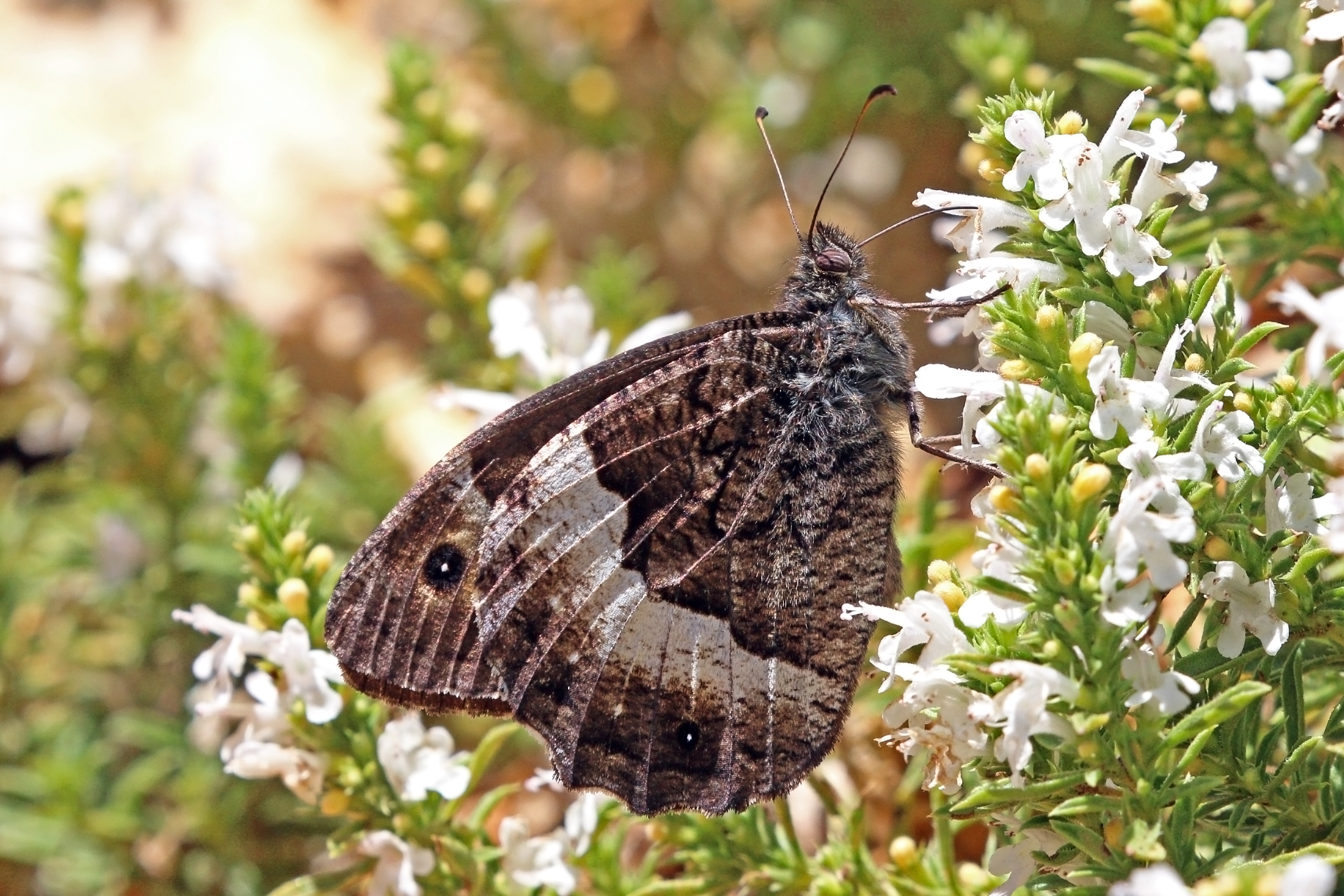
- male, Republic of North Macedonia

Conservation status
- Least Concern (IUCN 3.1)

Scientific classification
- Kingdom: Animalia
- Phylum: Arthropoda
- Clade: Pancrustacea
- Class: Insecta
- Order: Lepidoptera
- Family: Nymphalidae
- Genus: Hipparchia
- Species: H. fagi

Binomial name
- Hipparchia fagi (Scopoli, 1763)

Synonyms
- Papilio fagi Scopoli, 1763

= Hipparchia fagi =

Species of butterfly

Hipparchia fagi, the woodland grayling, is a butterfly of the family Nymphalidae.

== Etymology ==
The Latin species name fagi, meaning of "beech" (=fagus), refers to the prevailing species of trees in the relating biotope.

== Subspecies ==
There are tree subspecies:

- Hipparchia fagi fagi Scopoli, 1763
- Hipparchia fagi sicula (Schwingenschuss, 1942)
- Hipparchia fagi tigridia Agenjo, 1969

== Distribution and habitat ==
This species is widespread in southern half of Europe, from south of Belgium to central Germany, southern Poland, and to western Siberia (Yekaterinburg region east of the Urals). It occurs on broad-leaved deciduous forests, coniferous woodland, grassy vegetation, in woodland glades and woodland rides from sea level to 1,500 m–2,000 m elevation.

== Description ==
Hipparchia fagi has a wingspan of 66–76 mm (2.6–3.0 in). These large butterflies have dark brown uppersides of the wings, with a fringed margin, a white submarginal band more evident in the females and one black eyelet at the apex of each forewings. In the males the white band has a single very small eyelet on each hindwing, sometimes showing a white pupil, while in the females it shows one or two ocelli.

The underside of the forewings is rather similar to the upperside: The hindwings are marbled of brown and white with a broad white band. The white band on the internal edge of the underside hindwings is curved, while the white band on the underside forewings is often without a significant indent.

The colouration and pattern of these butterflies are an excellent camouflage on the bark of the trunks where the butterfly usually rests, with the eyespots hidden by the closed wings. It is rather similar to Hipparchia alcyone, Hipparchia syriaca and Hipparchia genava.

The caterpillar has a pale brown head with four darker streaks. Body is light brown with a bifid posterior end, a dark brown dorsal band and brownish lateral bands.

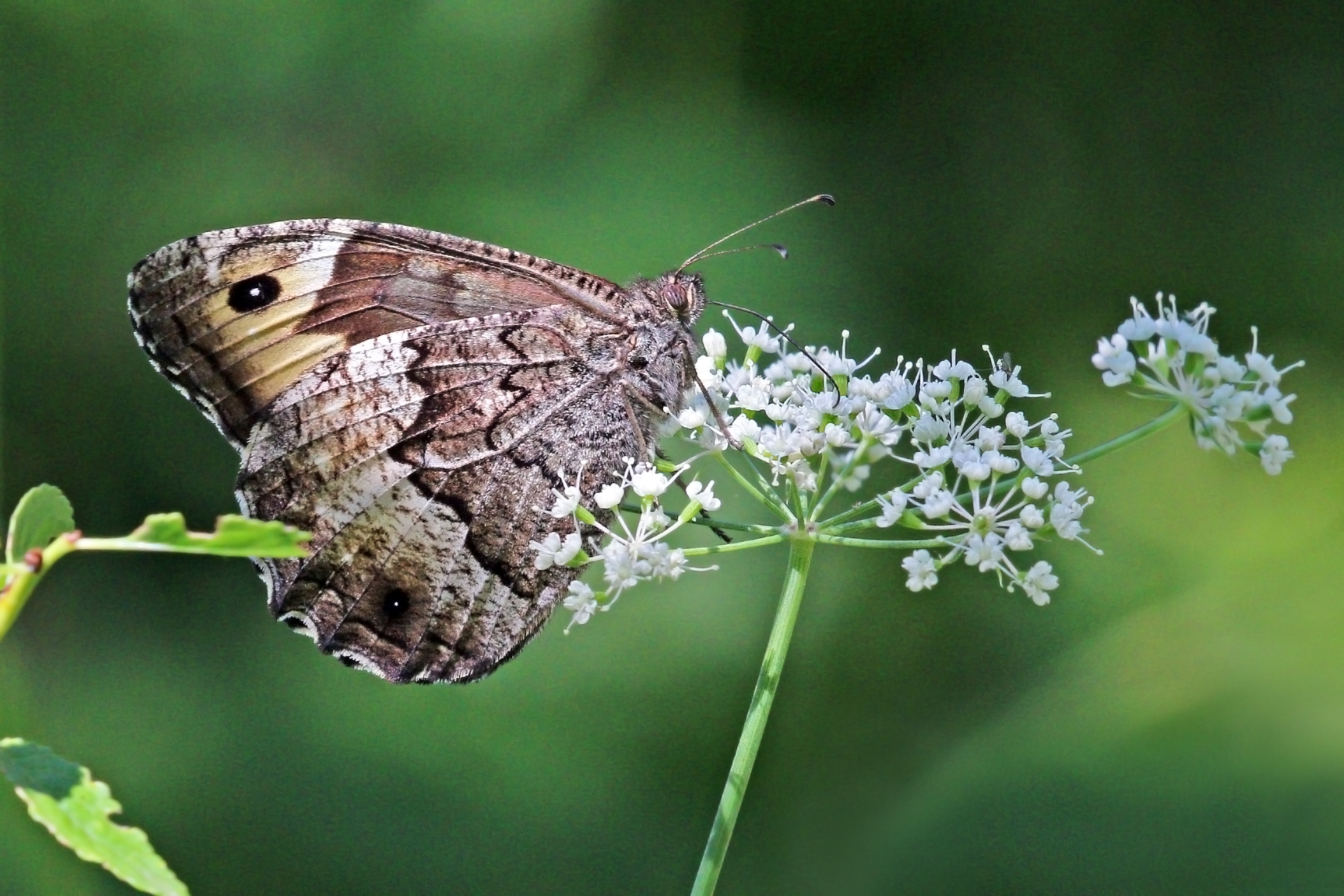
Female

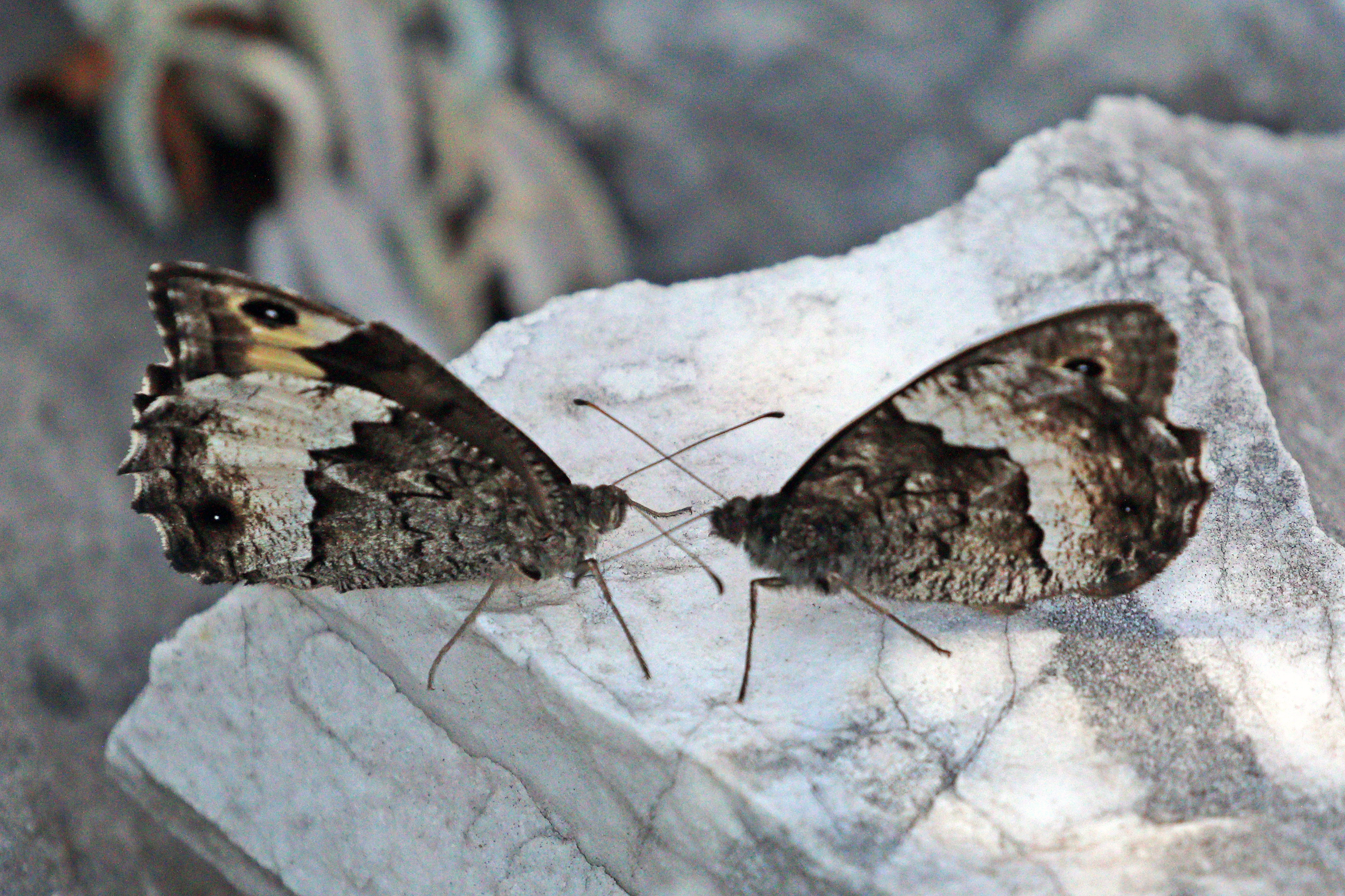
Courting – female on the left

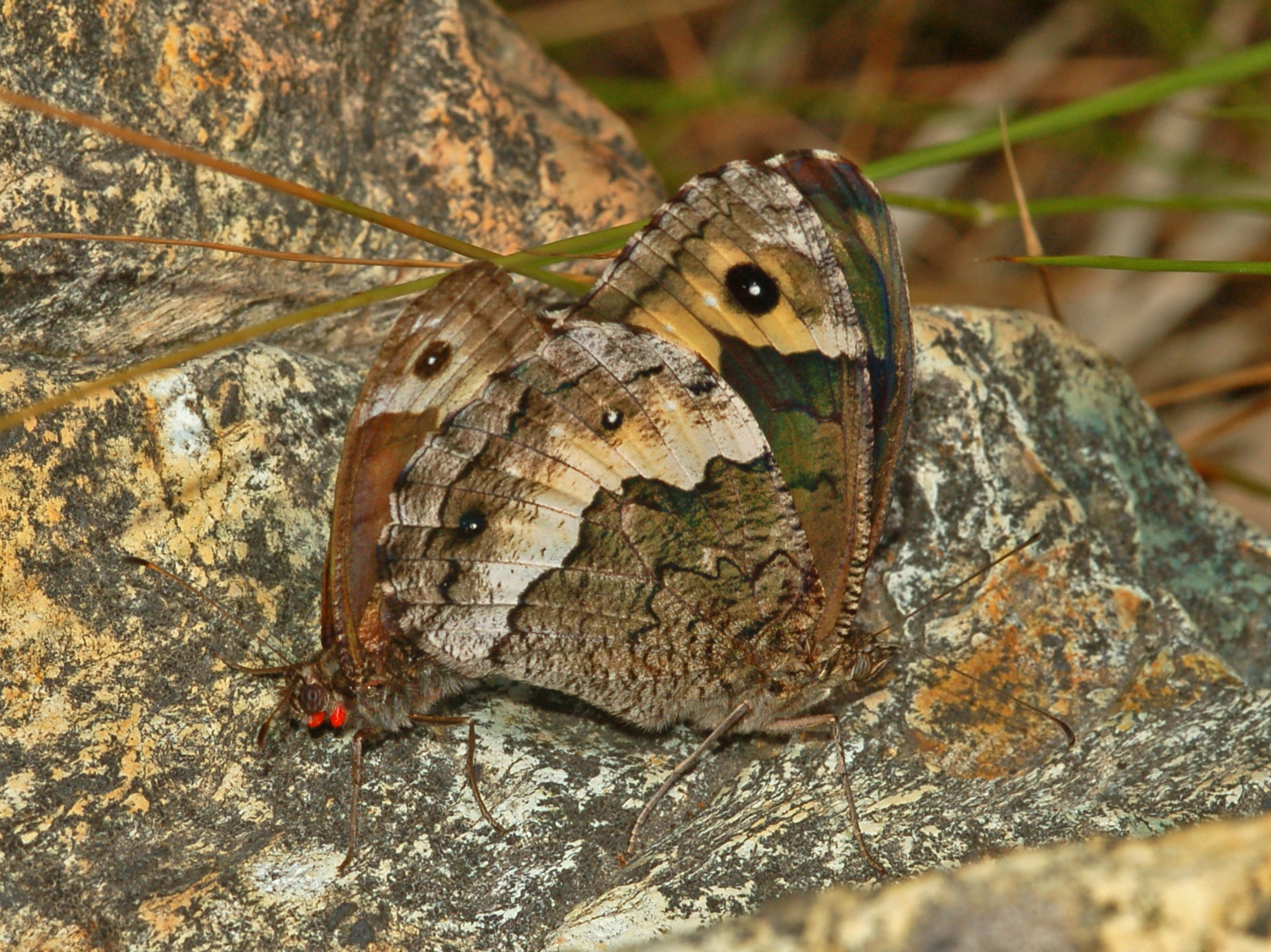
Mating – female on the right
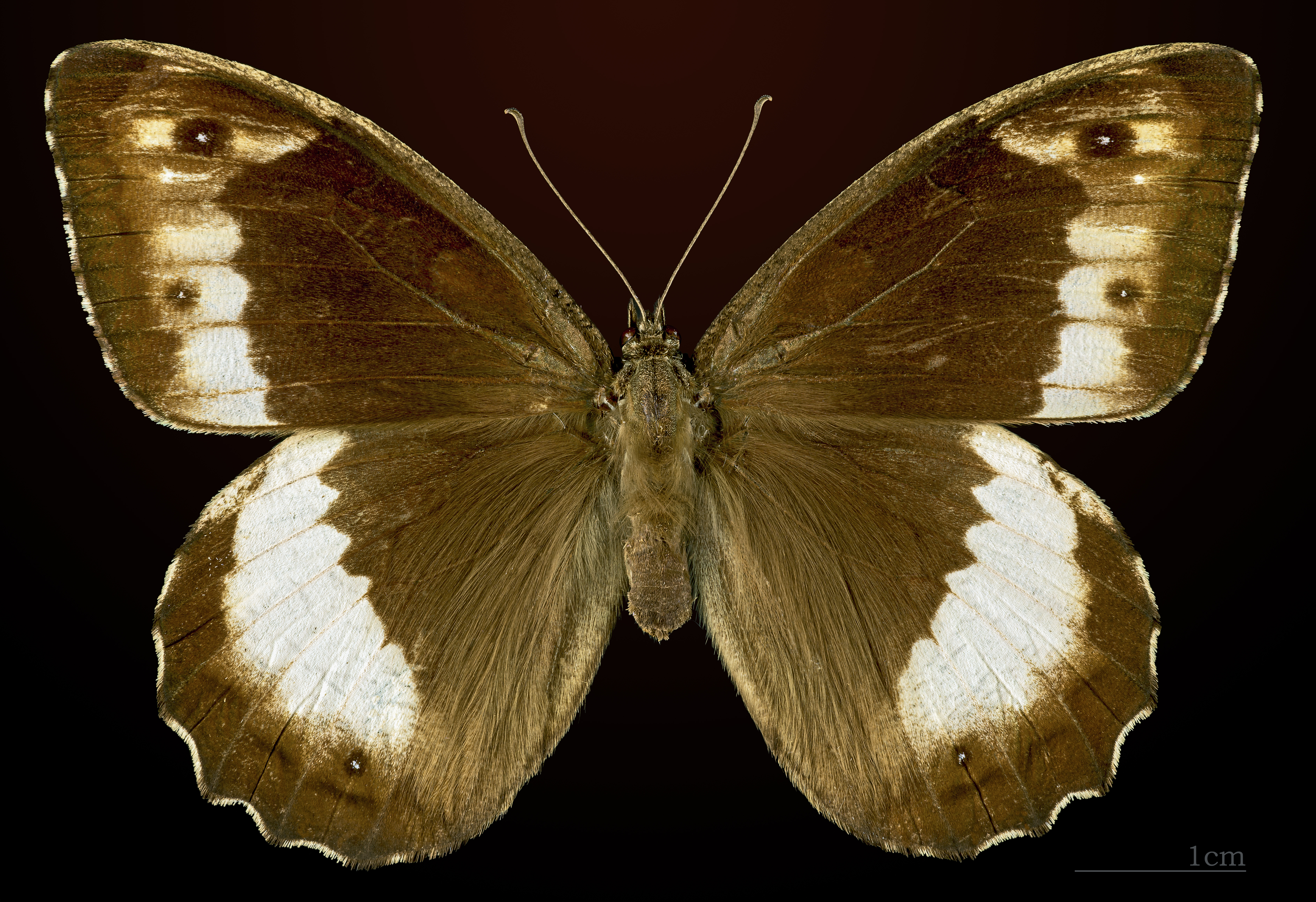
Female

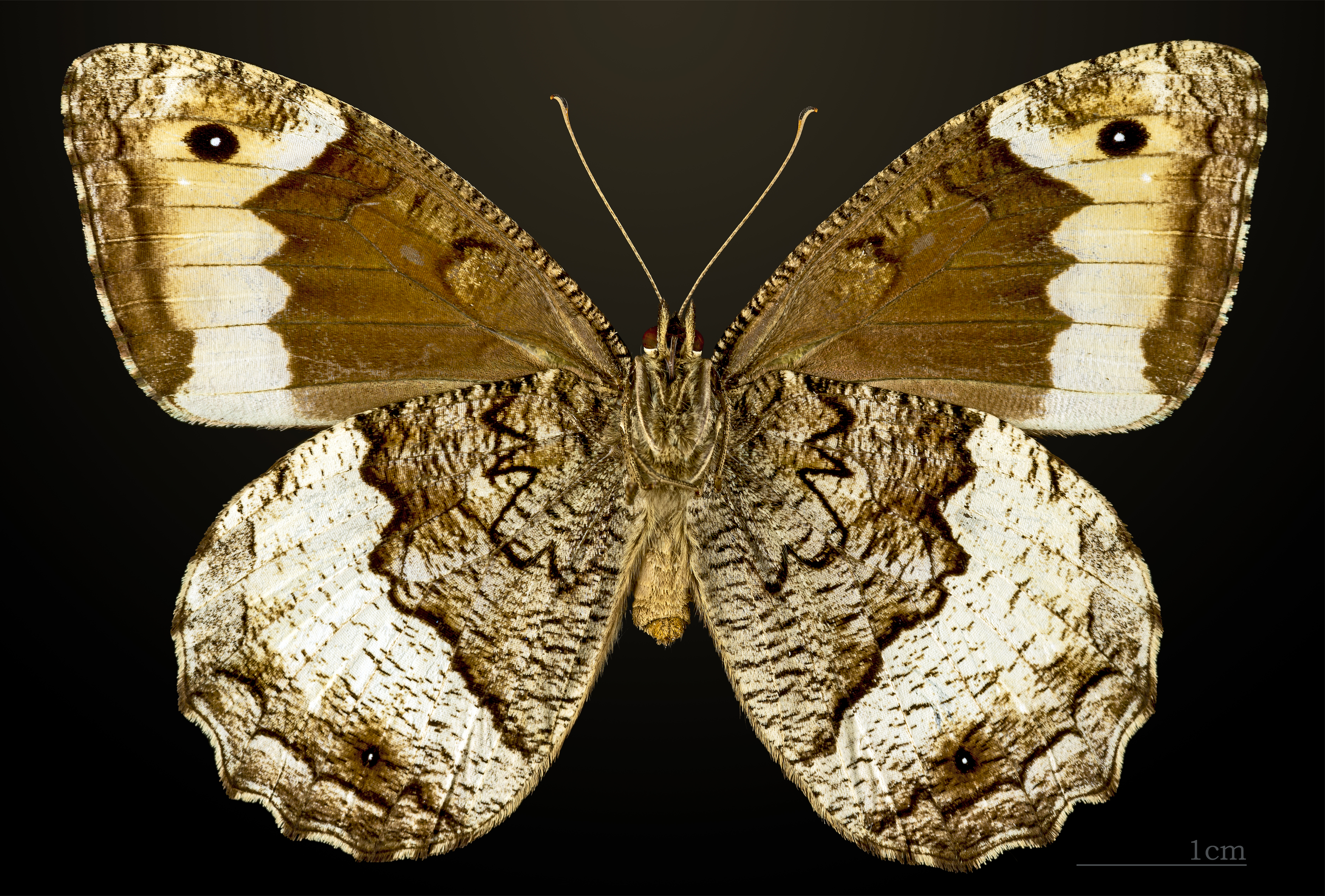
Female underside

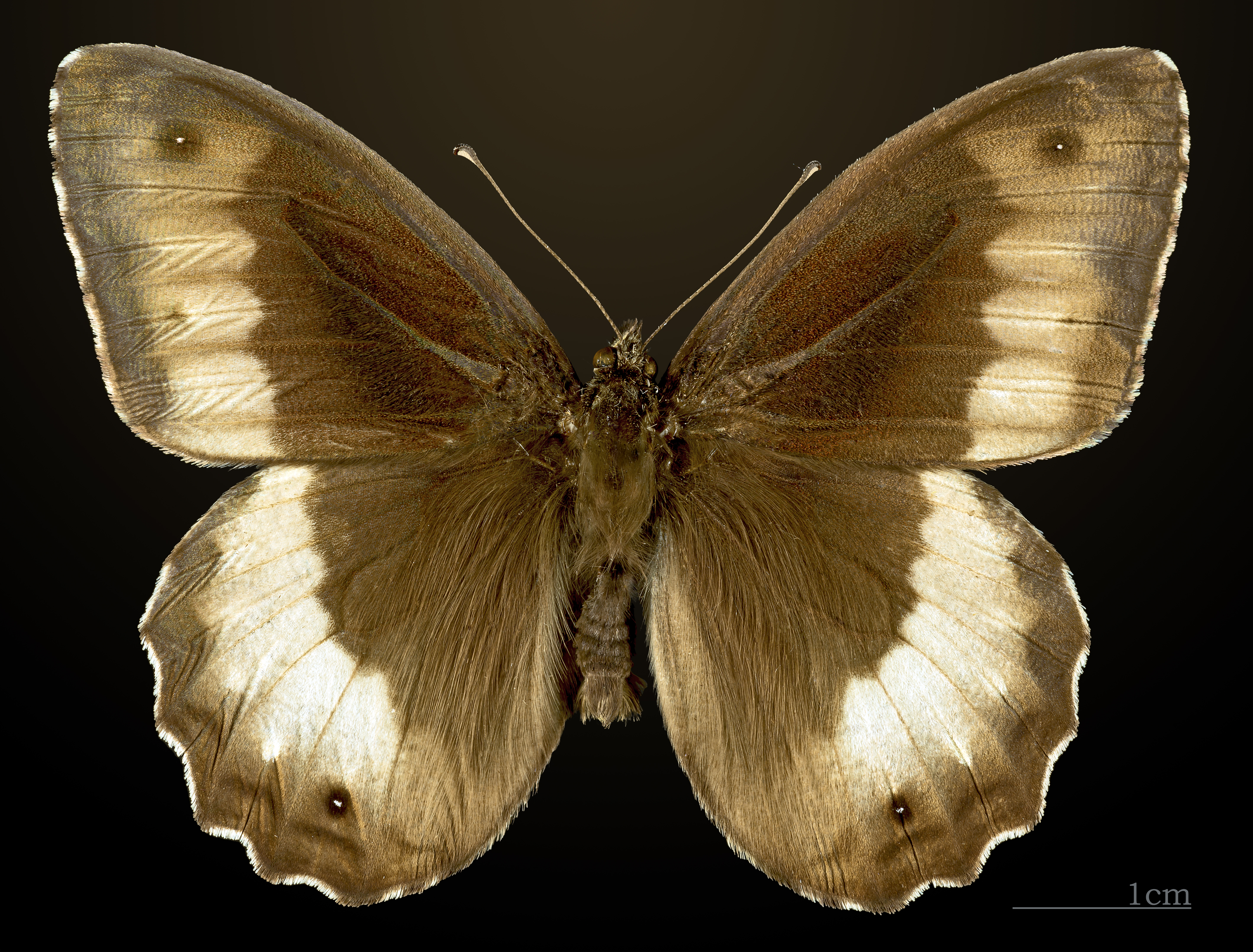
Male

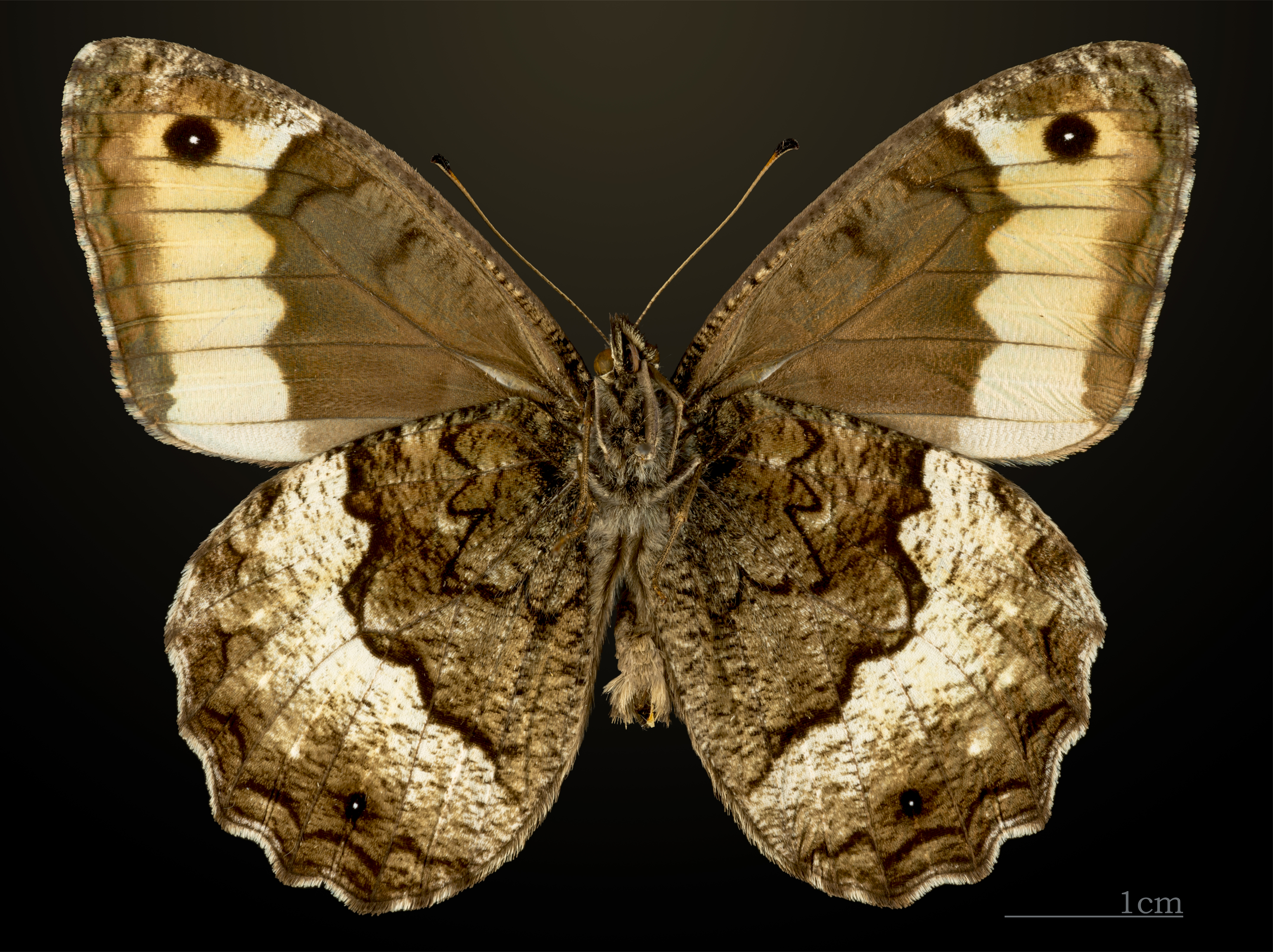
Male underside

== Biology ==
Adults fly from June to September, or even to October. This species has one generation a year. The caterpillars overwinter. The larvae feed on various types of grass, such as Brachypodium pinnatum, Bromus erectus, Festuca rubra, Holcus lanatus and Holcus mollis.

== Bibliography ==
- Kudrna, O. (1977): A Revision of the Genus Hipparchia Fabricius. — 300 S., Faringdon – London
- Kudrna, O., Harpke, A., Lux, K., Pennerstorfer, J., Schweiger, O., Settele, J. & M. Wiemers (2011): Distribution atlas of butterflies in Europe. – 576 S.; Halle a.d. Saale
- Lionel G. Higgins et Norman D. Riley, Guide des papillons d'Europe, Delachaux et Niestlé, 1988, (Lausanne).
- Tom Tolman, Richard Lewington, Guide des papillons d'Europe et d'Afrique du Nord, Delachaux et Niestlé, (ISBN 978-2-603-01649-7).
