= Hipparchia miguelensis =

Conservation status
- Near Threatened (IUCN 3.1)

Scientific classification
- Kingdom: Animalia
- Phylum: Arthropoda
- Class: Insecta
- Order: Lepidoptera
- Family: Nymphalidae
- Genus: Hipparchia
- Species: H. miguelensis

Binomial name
- Hipparchia miguelensis (Le Cerf, 1935)

Synonyms
- Satyrus azorinus miguelensis

Species of butterfly

Hipparchia azorina, commonly known as Le Cerf's grayling, is a species of butterfly in the family Nymphalidae. It is endemic to São Miguel Island in the Azores. It is sometimes considered a synonym of the related Hipparchia azorina, but is generally treated as a separate species.
