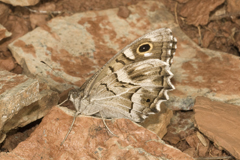

Scientific classification
- Kingdom: Animalia
- Phylum: Arthropoda
- Clade: Pancrustacea
- Class: Insecta
- Order: Lepidoptera
- Family: Nymphalidae
- Genus: Hipparchia
- Species: H. fidia

Binomial name
- Hipparchia fidia Linnaeus, 1767

Synonyms
- Pseudotergumia fidia

= Hipparchia fidia =

Species of butterfly

Hipparchia fidia, the striped grayling, is a butterfly of the family Nymphalidae. It is found on the Iberian Peninsula, the Balearic Islands and in south-eastern France and the bordering parts of Italy and North Africa.

== Description in Seitz ==
S. fidia L. (44 d). Above similar to the preceding [ fatua ], but the underside much more variegated and brighter: the ocelli of the forewing large, broadly bordered with yellow, there being before them white smears which are proximally bordered by a black line. On the underside of the hindwing the exterior black discal line projects behind the apex of the cell as a broad tooth; it is externally broadly white and beyond it there are moreover strong white smears extending towards the distal margin.

== Description ==
The wingspan is 48–56 millimetres (1.9–2.2 in).

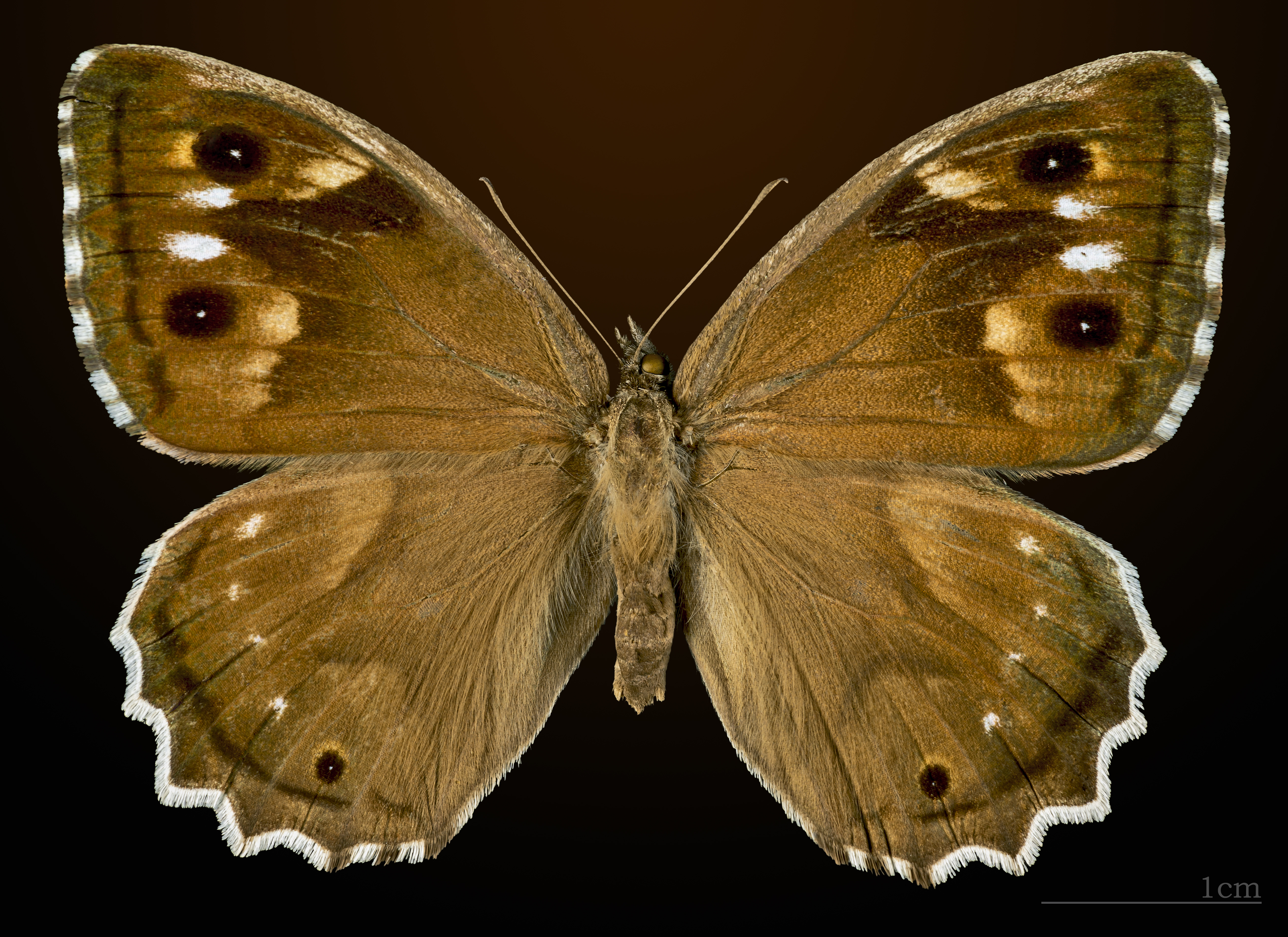
Female

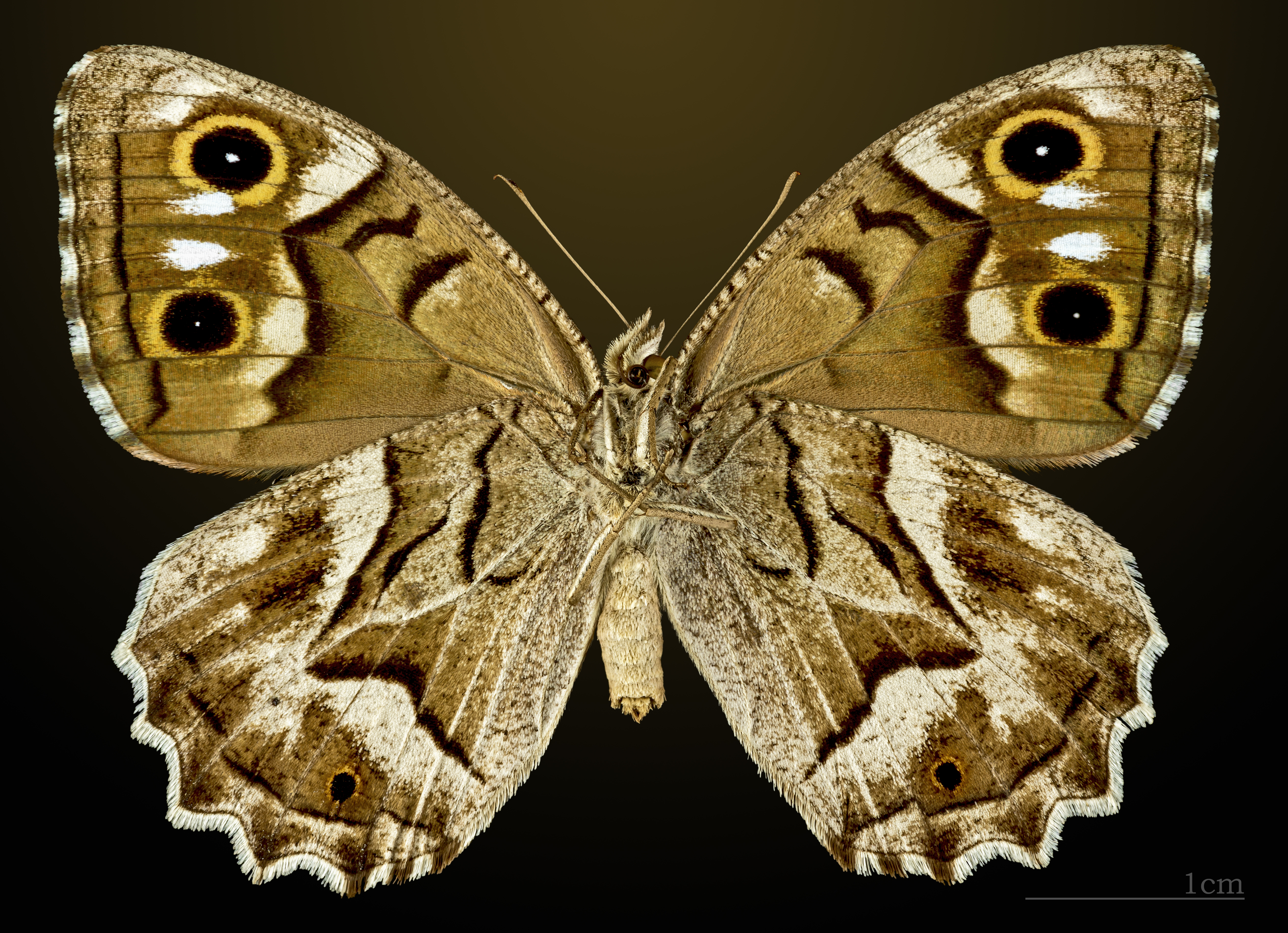
Female underside

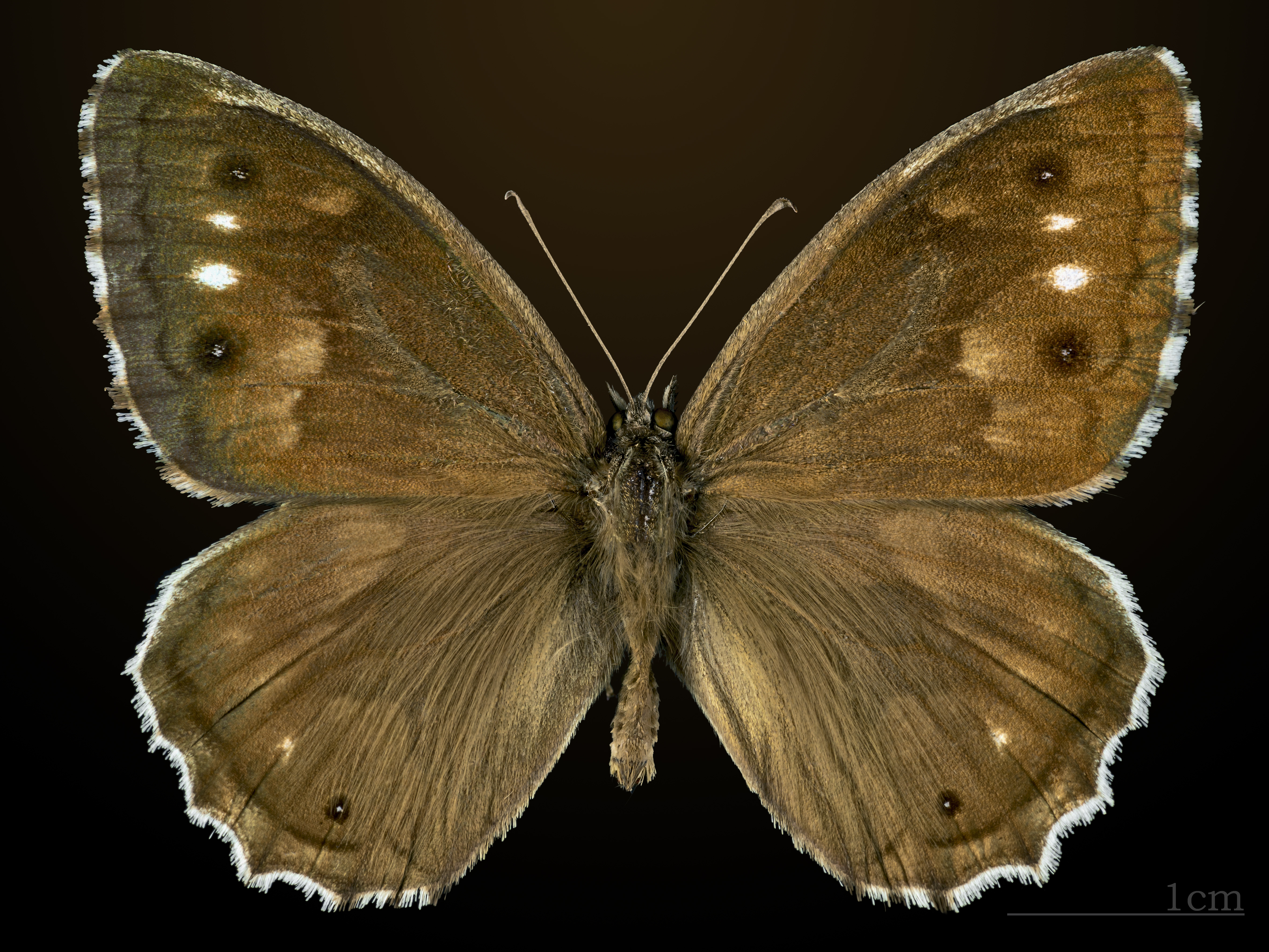
Male

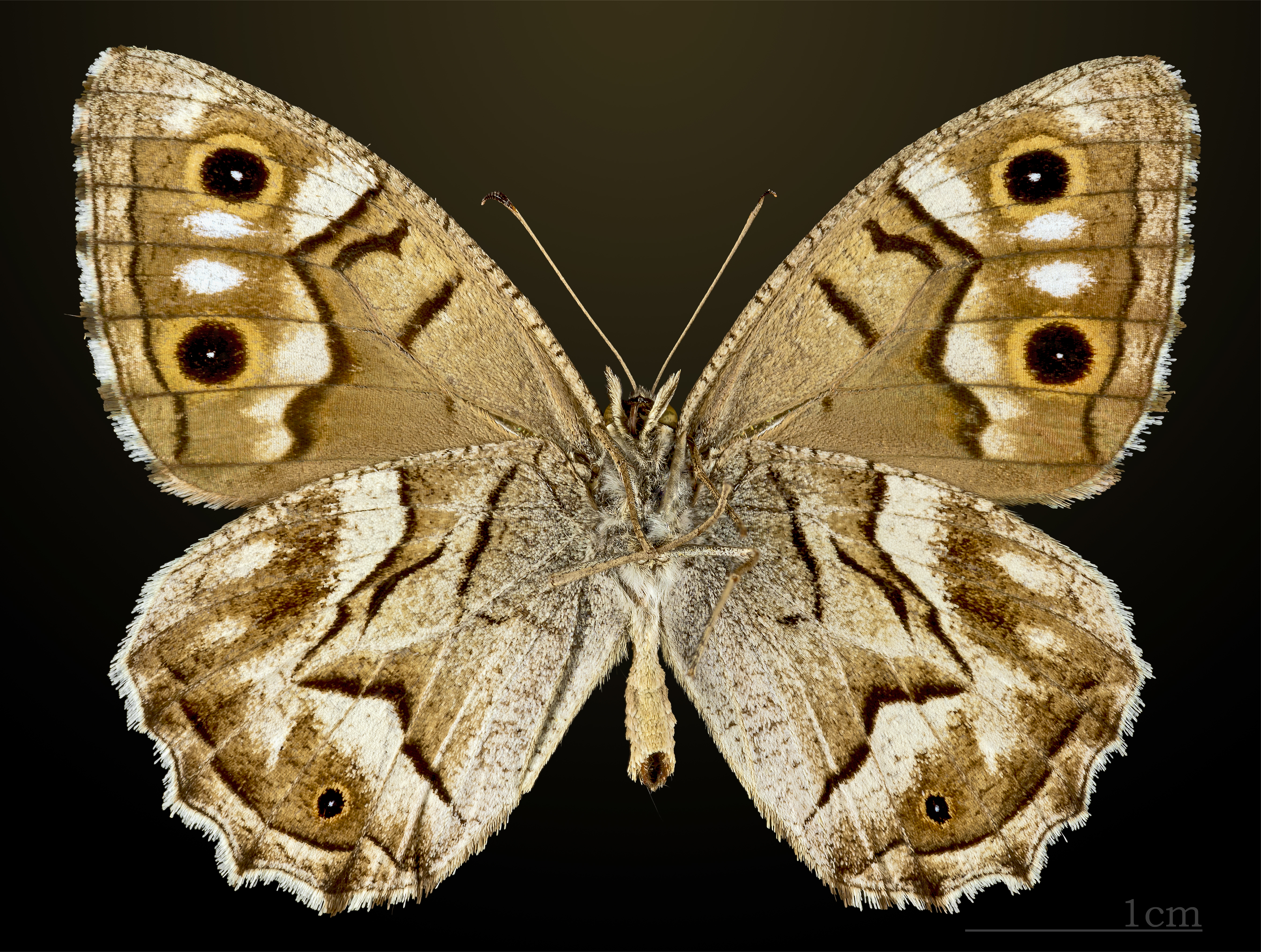
Male underside

== Biology ==
The butterflies fly from July to August depending on the location.

The larvae feed on various types of grass.
