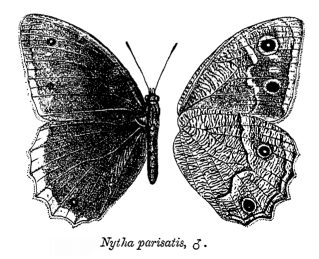

Scientific classification
- Kingdom: Animalia
- Phylum: Arthropoda
- Clade: Pancrustacea
- Class: Insecta
- Order: Lepidoptera
- Family: Nymphalidae
- Genus: Hipparchia
- Species: H. parisatis

Binomial name
- Hipparchia parisatis (Kollar, 1849)

Synonyms
- Eumenis parisatis Kollar, [1849]; Nytha parisatis (Kollar, [1849]); Satyrus parisatis (Kollar, [1849])

= Hipparchia parisatis =

Species of butterfly

Hipparchia parisatis, the white-edged rock brown, is a nymphalid species of satyrine butterfly found in Asia, including Turkey, Armenia, Iraq, Iran, Afghanistan, Turkestan, Uzbekistan, Tadzhikistan, the Palestinian Territories, India, the United Arab Emirates and Oman.

== Description ==
Male upperside dark Vandyke brown; costa preapically, lower half of termen on forewing narrowly and termen of hindwing more broadly bluish grey, crossed by the dark veins and touched with brown at the apices of the latter; forewing with a preapical black spot pupilled with white, another plain black spot in interspace 2, and two intermediate white dots; hindwing with a subanal white-centred black spot. Underside pale sepia brown, irrorated with numerous white striae, the discal and tornal area only of the forewing without striae; both wings crossed by a highly sinuous, broad, white discal band, inwardly defined by a dark brown line, subterminal and terminal narrow brown bands; the round black spots as on the upperside, but more distinct and ringed with yellow; hindwing with an additional ocellus in interspace 5. Antennae, head, thorax and abdomen concolorous with the wings above, paler below. Sex-mark a large dark brown patch of specialized scales on basal half of forewing,

Female: Similar, the greyish-white marginal borders broader.
