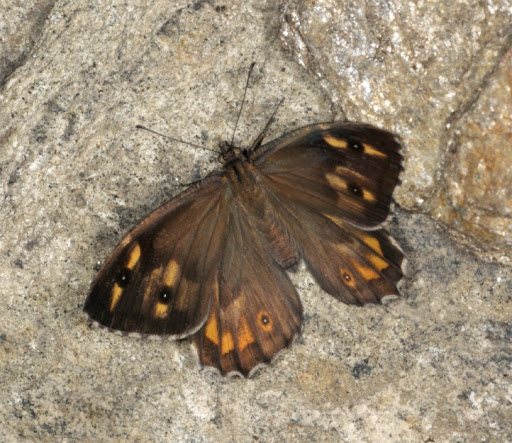

Conservation status
- Least Concern (IUCN 3.1)

Scientific classification
- Kingdom: Animalia
- Phylum: Arthropoda
- Class: Insecta
- Order: Lepidoptera
- Family: Nymphalidae
- Genus: Hipparchia
- Species: H. maderensis

Binomial name
- Hipparchia maderensis (Bethune-Baker, 1891)

= Hipparchia maderensis =

Species of butterfly

Hipparchia maderensis, the Madeiran grayling, is a species of butterfly in the family Nymphalidae. It is endemic to Madeira. Its natural habitat is temperate forests. Seitz treats it as a race of Hipparchia semele - in maderensis Baker, from Madeira the upperside in both sexes is strongly obscured and in the male almost without any markings.
