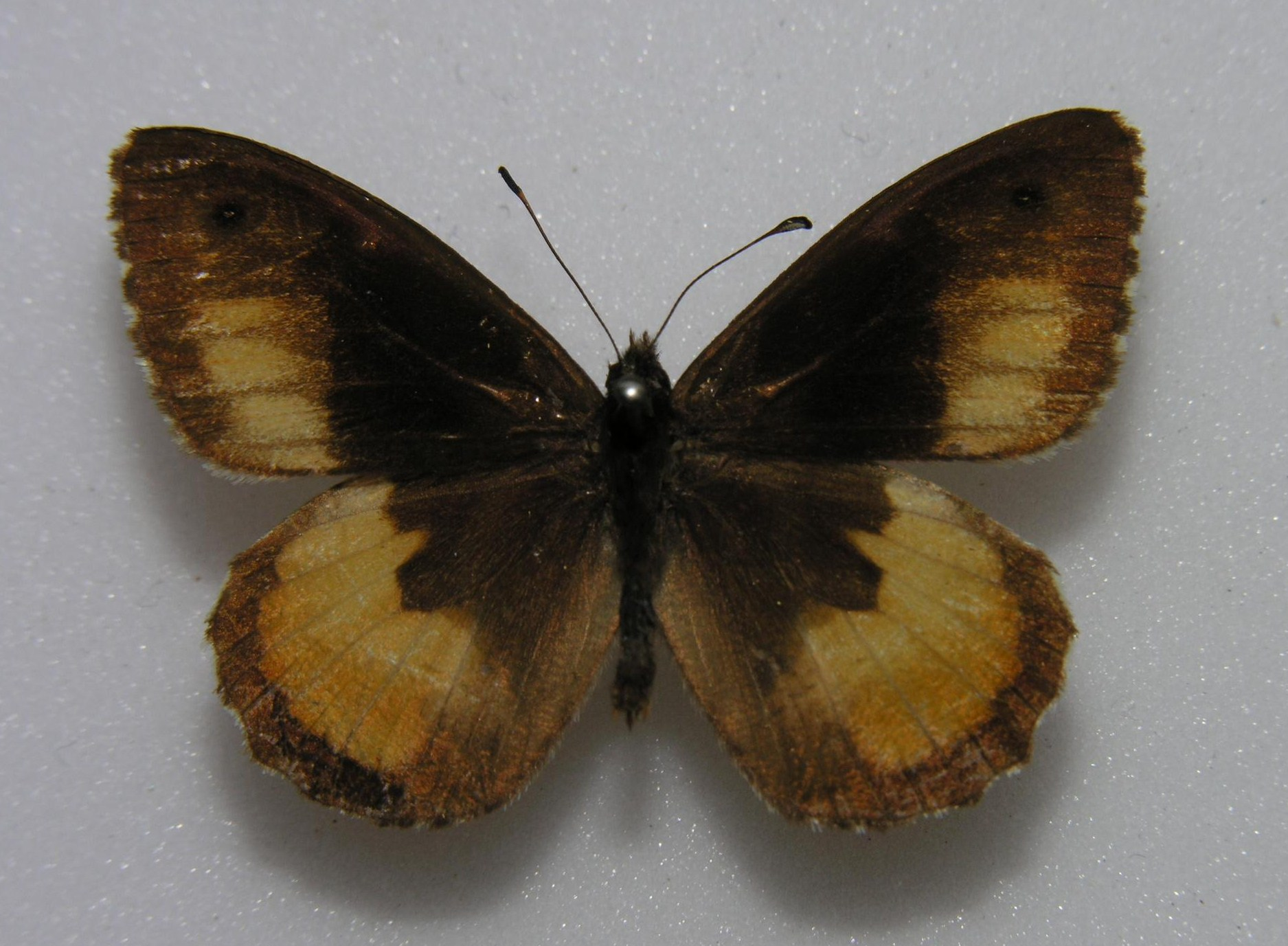
- Female from Corsica

Scientific classification
- Domain: Eukaryota
- Kingdom: Animalia
- Phylum: Arthropoda
- Class: Insecta
- Order: Lepidoptera
- Family: Nymphalidae
- Genus: Hipparchia
- Species: H. neomiris

Binomial name
- Hipparchia neomiris Godart, 1822

= Hipparchia neomiris =

Corsican grayling

Species of butterfly

Hipparchia neomiris, the Corsican grayling, is a butterfly in the family Nymphalidae. It is an endemic species confined to the islands of Corsica (where it is widespread and common in mountainous regions), Sardinia and Elba. The Corsican grayling flies in July.

The larvae feed on Poaceae.

== Description ==
S. neomiris' God. (= marmorae Hbn., jolans Bon.) (43 c). Similar to alcyone and doubtless closely related to it. The distal band light orange, being bright above, very broad on the hindwing, proximally sharply defined and distally tinged with reddish yellow. On the underside the orange band of the forewing contrasts sharply with the black-brown basal area. The hindwing beneath with a broad white median band which is bordered with black proximally. The apical ocellus of the forewing centred with white on both sides. On Sardinia and Corsica, also on Elba. — Egg almost globular, ivory-white, minutely ribbed, the larva appearing in 14 days. The larva is ivory-yellow, with a thin, black, dorsal double line; above the spirales a black side-line, which is interrupted on each segment. Head pale brown, with black mandibles; on grass (Kollmorgen). — The butterflies occur in mountainous districts, from 700 m upwards, from June till August, locally plentiful, settling particularly often on the trunks of Conifers.

— Adalbert Seitz
