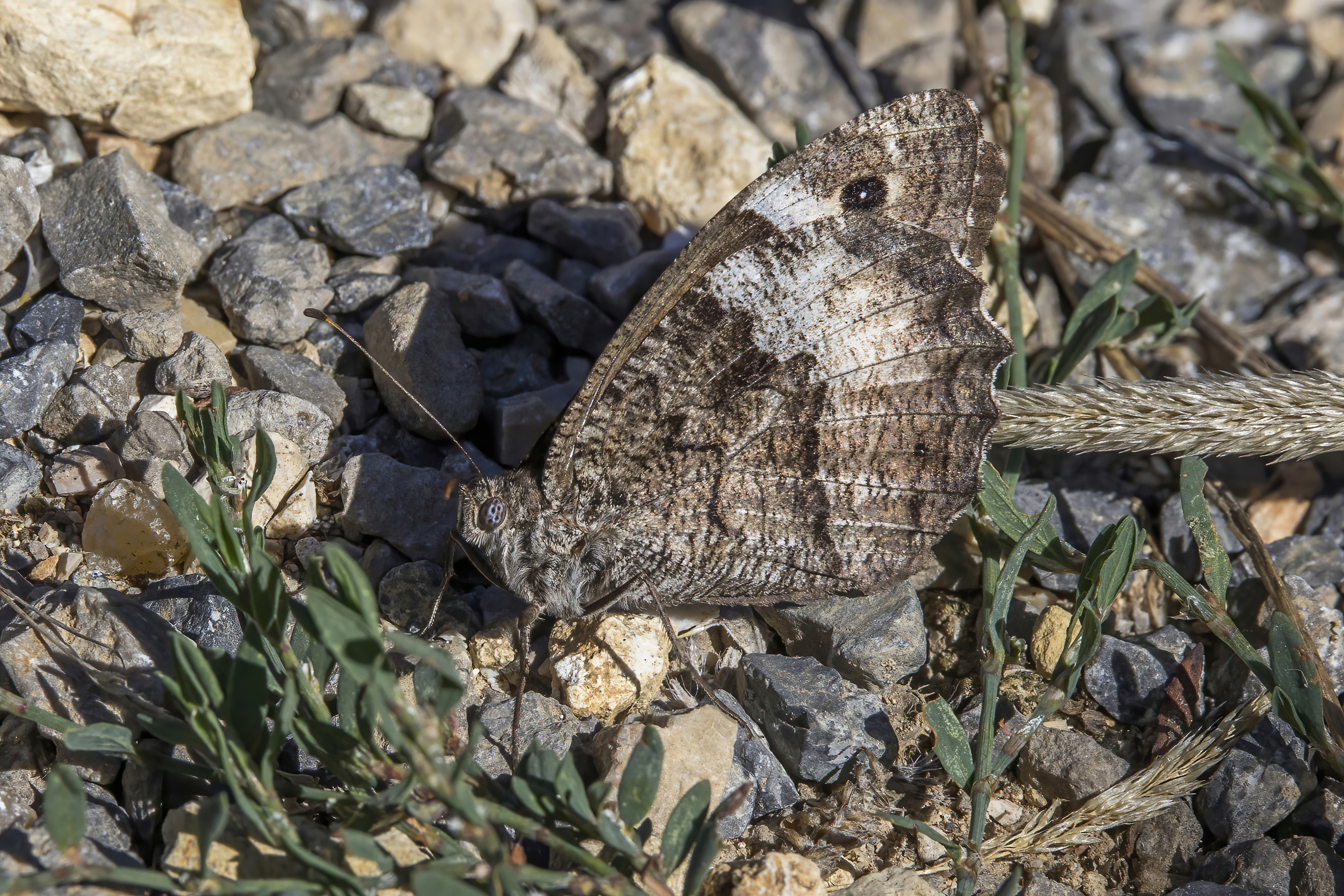
- H. s. syriaca, Corfu, Greece
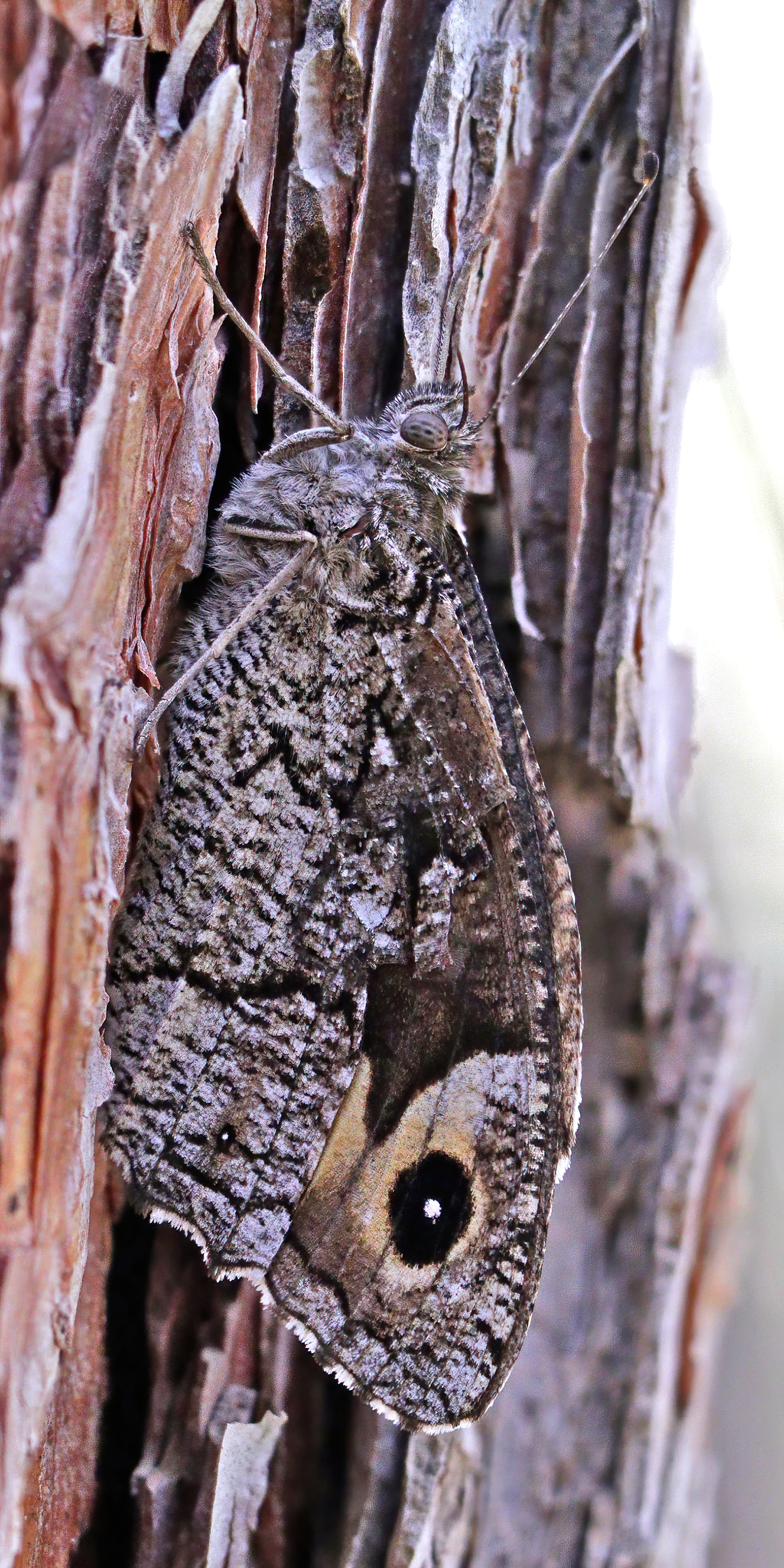
- H. s. cypriaca, Cyprus

Scientific classification
- Domain: Eukaryota
- Kingdom: Animalia
- Phylum: Arthropoda
- Class: Insecta
- Order: Lepidoptera
- Family: Nymphalidae
- Genus: Hipparchia
- Species: H. syriaca

Binomial name
- Hipparchia syriaca (Staudinger, 1871)

Synonyms
- Satyrus hermione syriaca Staudinger, 1871; Satyrus hermione attikana Fruhstorfer, 1907; Eumenis fagi serula Fruhstorfer, 1908

= Hipparchia syriaca =

Species of butterfly

Hipparchia syriaca is a species of butterfly in the family Nymphalidae. It is found in Greece especially on the island of Samos, Turkey, Bulgaria, Albania, North Macedonia, Caucasus and Transcaucasia. It is found on the edges of foothills and mountain forests up to 2,000 m

== Description ==
Very like Hipparchia hermione but the band of the forewing is narrower, being entirely obsolete in the anal area of the hindwing.

== Flight period ==
Typically June to August, depending on altitude and locality. In Cyprus, the flight time of H. s. cypriaca is from May to October, or later.

== Food plants ==
Larvae feed on Holcus species.

== Biotope ==
Bushy places pine woods and clearings.

== Sources ==
- Species info
- "Hipparchia Fabricius, 1807" at Markku Savela's Lepidoptera and Some Other Life Forms
