= Hipparchia sbordonii =

Ponza grayling

Conservation status
- Endangered (IUCN 3.1)

Scientific classification
- Kingdom: Animalia
- Phylum: Arthropoda
- Clade: Pancrustacea
- Class: Insecta
- Order: Lepidoptera
- Family: Nymphalidae
- Genus: Hipparchia
- Species: H. sbordonii

Binomial name
- Hipparchia sbordonii (Kudrna, 1984)

Species of butterfly

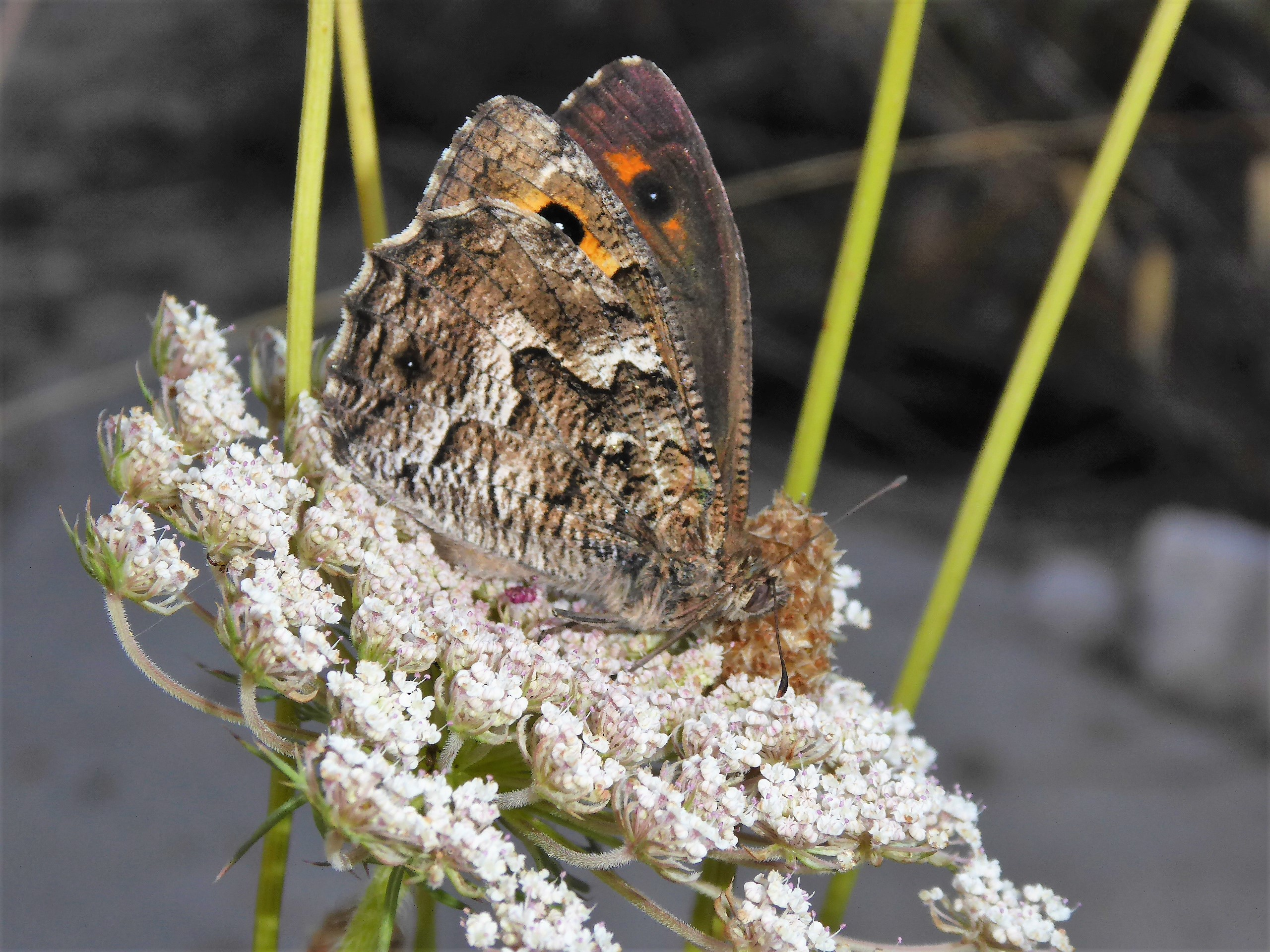
A male H. Sbordonii

Hipparchia sbordonii, the Ponza grayling, is a butterfly of the family Nymphalidae. It is an endemic species found only on the Pontine Islands of Italy.
