= Hipparchia tewfiki =

Scientific classification
- Kingdom: Animalia
- Phylum: Arthropoda
- Clade: Pancrustacea
- Class: Insecta
- Order: Lepidoptera
- Family: Nymphalidae
- Genus: Hipparchia
- Species: H. tewfiki

Binomial name
- Hipparchia tewfiki (Wiltshire, 1949)

Synonyms
- Eumenis tewfiki Wiltshire, 1949; Hipparchia (Pseudotergumia) tewfiki

Species of butterfly

Hipparchia tewfiki is a butterfly in the family Nymphalidae. It is found in south-western Saudi Arabia and Yemen.
