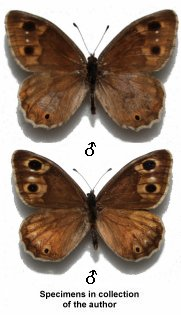

Scientific classification
- Kingdom: Animalia
- Phylum: Arthropoda
- Clade: Pancrustacea
- Class: Insecta
- Order: Lepidoptera
- Family: Nymphalidae
- Genus: Hipparchia
- Species: H. hansii

Binomial name
- Hipparchia hansii (Austaut, 1879)

Synonyms
- Satyrus hansii Austaut, 1879; Satyrus hansii var. montana Austaut, 1905; Satyrus Fauna-holli Oberthür, 1909; Satyrus colombati Oberthür, 1921; Satyrus belouini Oberthür, 1921; Satyrus colombati ab. stellifer Chnéour, 1942; Satyrus statilinus f. chpakowskyi Chnéour, 1942; Satyrus hansii intermedia Chnéour, 1963; Satyrus hansii tlemceni Slaby, 1977; Hipparchia hansii tansleyi Tarrier, 1995; Neohipparchia hansii

= Hipparchia hansii =

Species of butterfly

Hipparchia hansii is a species of butterfly in the family Nymphalidae. It is endemic to the North African region, mainly Morocco, Algeria, Tunisia and western Libya. Its natural habitats are dense soil, grazed and rocky slopes, and ridges. It prefers to stay in the shade. This is one of the last butterflies that flies in the season.

== Subspecies ==
There are four subspecies of Hipparchia hansii:

- H. h. colombati (Tea Ito, Middle Atlas Central)
- H. h. tansleyi (Ait Abdallah, Anti-Atlas south-west & Tizi-n-Test, southern High Atlas)
- H. h. subsaharae (Jebel Sarrho, Anti-Atlas oriental)
- H. h. tlemcen (Monts de Beni-Snassen, Tell Atlas)

== Flight period ==
September to October, depending on altitude and locality.

== Food plants ==
Larvae have been reared on Festuca species.

== Sources ==
- Satyrinae of the Western Palearctic - Hipparchia hansii
- Species info
- "Hipparchia Fabricius, 1807" at Markku Savela's Lepidoptera and Some Other Life Forms
