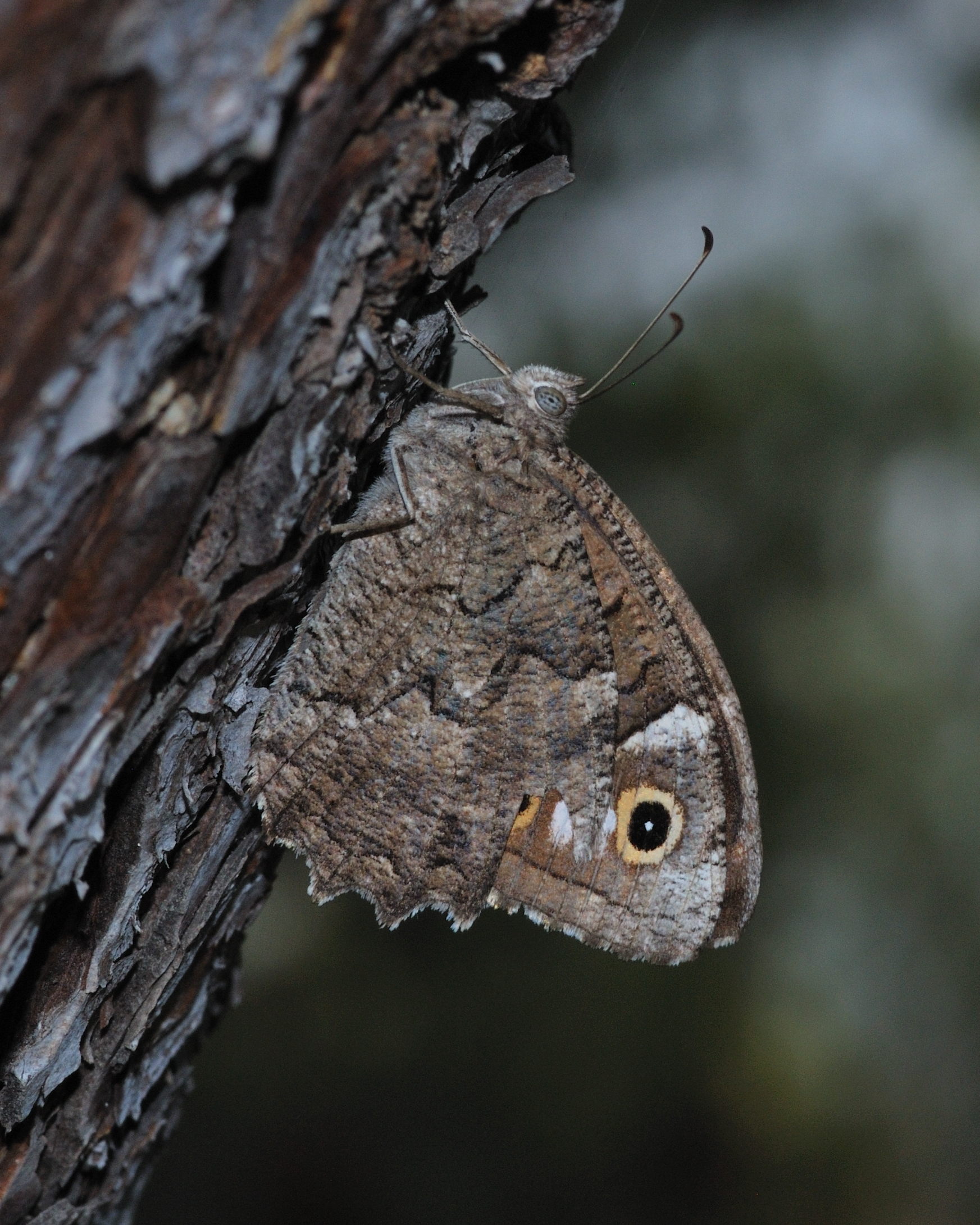

Scientific classification
- Domain: Eukaryota
- Kingdom: Animalia
- Phylum: Arthropoda
- Class: Insecta
- Order: Lepidoptera
- Family: Nymphalidae
- Genus: Hipparchia
- Species: H. fatua

Binomial name
- Hipparchia fatua Freyer, 1844

= Hipparchia fatua =

Species of butterfly

Hipparchia fatua, or Freyer's grayling, is a butterfly of the family Nymphalidae. The species can be found from the Balkans, through Anatolia up to Iran.

The wingspan is 30–34 millimetres (1.2–1.3 in).

== Description in Seitz ==
S. fatua Frr. (= allionii Hbn). Very similar to the preceding [ statilinus ], mostly larger; differs on the upper- side in having a dark submarginal line, and on the underside in the hindwing being more unicolorous and bearing mostly 2 deeply dentate black curved lines across the central area. Hindwing above often very pale in the distal area. Greece; Asia Minor. — sichaea Led. (44c) is a very large form from Syria, with the underside of the hindwing prominently marmorated. — wyssi Christ. (44c), from the Canaries now a full species, is midway between the last two forms, some specimens approaching nymotypical fatua, others being nearer to sichaea. — sylvicola Aust. (44c) [now H. statilinus sylvicola (Austaut, 1880) resembles above the nymotypical form, the underside of the hindwing, however, being entirely uniformly brown-grey and completely without markings. It occurs in West Algeria and was obtained at the same place as hansii, but flies in September, while hansii was caught in July. The status of these North African forms has not yet completely been cleared up. — The species, like the statilinus forms, prefer sandy soil and pine forests. On the Canary Islands the butterflies have been observed flying about the rocks on the coast and settling with preference on that side of the trunks of Pinus canariensis which faces the sun. According to Staudinger specimens of fatua are sometimes on the wing at night, entering the lit up windows and coming to the lantern. The butterflies fly from June to October.

The larvae feed on various types of grass.
