= Hipparchia neapolitana =

Scientific classification
- Kingdom: Animalia
- Phylum: Arthropoda
- Clade: Pancrustacea
- Class: Insecta
- Order: Lepidoptera
- Family: Nymphalidae
- Genus: Hipparchia
- Species: H. neapolitana

Binomial name
- Hipparchia neapolitana (Stauder, 1921)

Synonyms
- Hipparchia (Parahipparchia) balletto Kudrna, 1984; Satyrus blacherioides Stauder, 1921

Species of butterfly

Hipparchia neapolitana, the Italian grayling, is a butterfly of the family Nymphalidae. It is an endemic species found only in the Campania region of Italy. neapolitana
