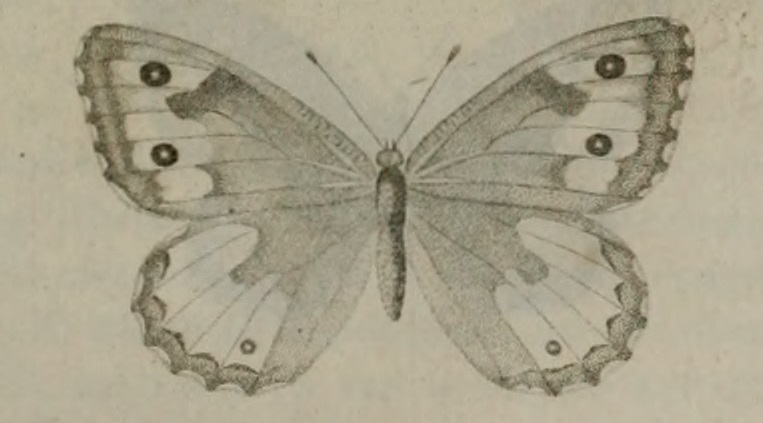

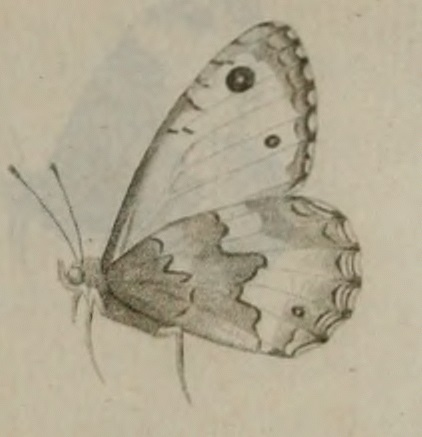

Scientific classification
- Kingdom: Animalia
- Phylum: Arthropoda
- Clade: Pancrustacea
- Class: Insecta
- Order: Lepidoptera
- Family: Nymphalidae
- Genus: Hipparchia
- Species: H. aristaeus

Binomial name
- Hipparchia aristaeus (Bonelli, 1826)

Synonyms
- Papilio Satyrus aristaeus Bonelli, 1826; Hipparchia (Parahipparchia) aristaeus; Satyrus semele var. algirica Oberthür, 1876; Hipparchia semele pallidalgirica Verity, 1923

= Hipparchia aristaeus =

Species of butterfly

Hipparchia aristaeus, the southern grayling, is a butterfly of the family Nymphalidae. It was described by Franco Andrea Bonelli in 1826. It is found in North Africa, southern Europe (Greece, Sicily, Sardinia, Corsica) and Asia Minor. The habitat consists of hot dry rocky areas.

The wingspan is 50–60 mm. According to Seitz aristaeus Bon. (42 f), from Sardinia and Corsica, has a heavy red- brown tint in the pale bands, which colour in the female extends far into the disc of the forewing. Adults are on wing from May to August.

The larvae feed on grasses of the family Gramineae.

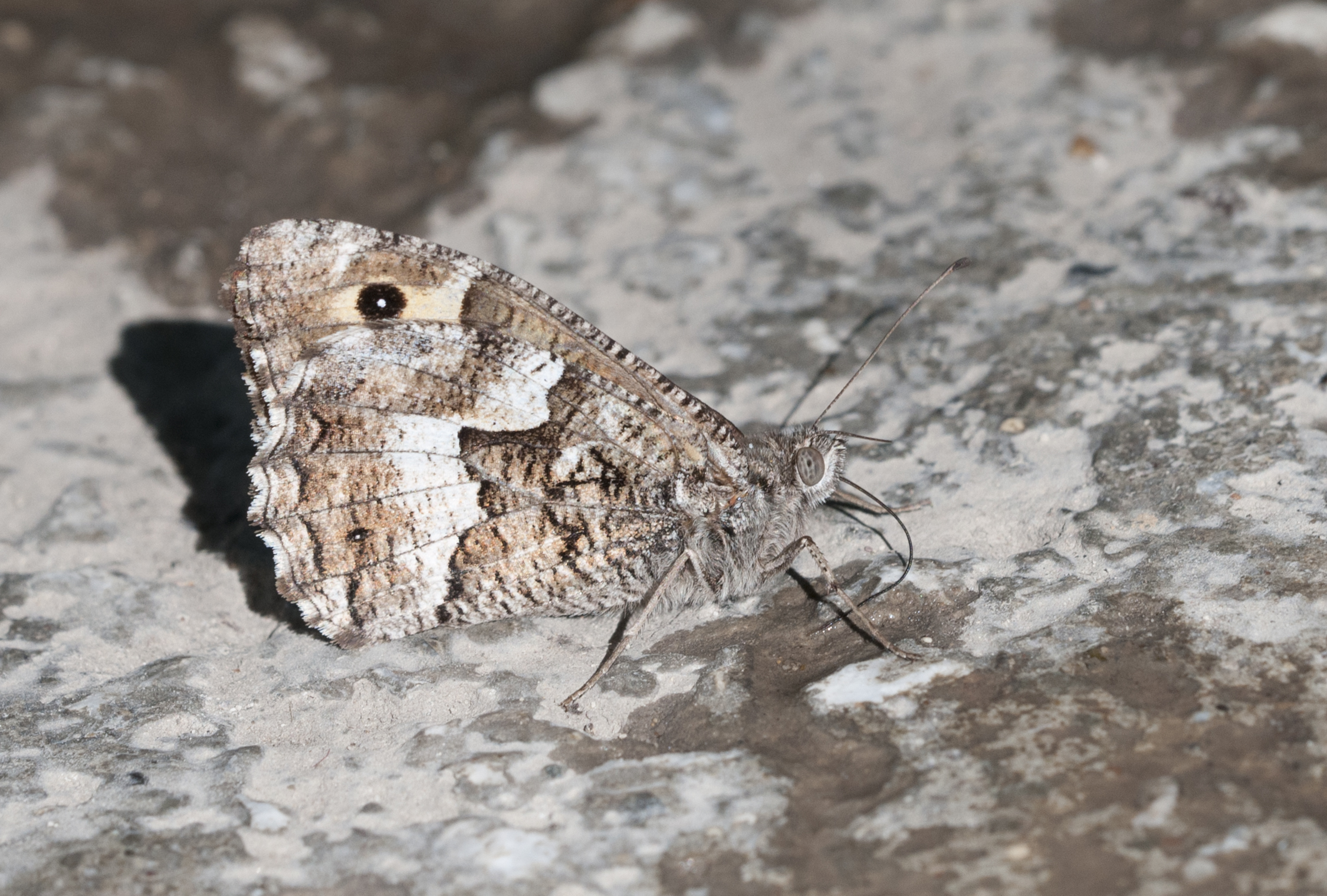
Hipparchia aristaeus Turkey

== Subspecies ==
- Hipparchia aristaeus aristaeus
- Hipparchia aristaeus algirica (Oberthür, 1876) (North Africa)
