= Jules Léon Austaut =

French entomologist (1844–1929)

Jules Léon Austaut (1844 – 1929) was a French entomologist who specialised in Lepidoptera.

== Works ==
- 1879. Lépidoptères nouveaux d'Algérie. Petites Nouvelles entomologiques, 2, p. 293
- 1879-1885. Lépidoptères nouveaux d'Algérie. Le Naturaliste 7, pp. 141–142
- 1885. Lépidoptères nouveaux d'Algérie. Le Naturaliste 1, pp. 85 (1879), 156, 212, 220-221, 237, 284 (1880); 2, pp. 359-360 (1883), 391-392 (1884) & 3, pp. 141-142 (1885)
- 1895. Notice sur le Parnassius poeta Oberthür et sur une variété inédite de cette espèce (variété oberthuri) Austaut. Le Naturaliste 17, pp. 247–248
- 1889. Les Parnassiens de la faune Paléarctique, Leipzig, Ernst Heyne, 223 pages, 32 coloured plates
- 1890. Notice sur Colias erschoffi et sur sa nouvelle variété tancrei (Austaut). Le Naturaliste 12, p. 94
- 1891. Deux Parnassius nouveaux de l'Asie Centrale. Le Naturaliste 13, p. 180
- 1891. Le Colias wiskotti Staudinger et ses diverses variétés. Le Naturaliste 13, pp. 98–99
- 1895. Notice sur le Parnassius poeta Oberthür et sur une variété inédite de cette espèce (variété oberthuri) Austaut. Le Naturaliste 17, pp. 247–248
- 1895. Note sur un Parnassien nouveau du Thibet. Le Naturaliste 17, p. 39
- 1898. Lépidoptères nouveaux de l'Asie centrale et Orientale. Le Naturaliste 20, pp. 201–202
- 1898. Notice sur les Parnassius jacquemontii Boisd., epaphus Oberth., mercurius Groum, poeta Oberth. et sur une espèce inédite du Thibet septentrional, Parnassius tsaidamensis Austaut. Le Naturaliste 20, pp. 104–106
- 1899. Lepidoptères nouveaux de l'Asie. Le Naturaliste 21, pp. 284–285
- 1900. Notice sur deux varietés inédites du Parnassius apollo. Parn. apollo Ober. inversa Austaut, Parn. apollo var. eiffelensis Austaut. Le Naturaliste 22, p. 142
- 1905. Notice sur quelques Lépidoptères nouveaux. Entomologische Zeitschrift 18, p. 143
- 1906. Notice sur quelques espèces nouvelles ou peu connues du genre Parnassius. Entomologische Zeitschrift, 20, pp. 66–68
- 1910. Notice sur quelques Parnassius nouveaux. Entomologische Zeitschrift 24, pp. 55–56
- 1911. Lépidoptères nouveaux. Entomologische Zeitschrift 24, pp. 224–225
- 1911. Lépidoptères asiatiques nouveaux. Entomologische Zeitschrift 24, pp. 242–244
- 1912. Notice sur quelques formes aberrantes de Parnassius. Internationale Entomologische Zeitschrift 5, pp. 359–361
- 1912. Lépidoptères asiatiques nouveaux. Internationale Entomologische Zeitschrift 6, pp. 87–89

== Sources ==
- Lhoste, J., 1987 Les Entomologistes francais 1750 - 1950. INRA, OPIE (Entomology): 115 [A1036].

== Sources ==
- Lhoste, J., 1987 Les Entomologistes francais 1750 - 1950. INRA, OPIE (Entomology): 115 [A1036].
