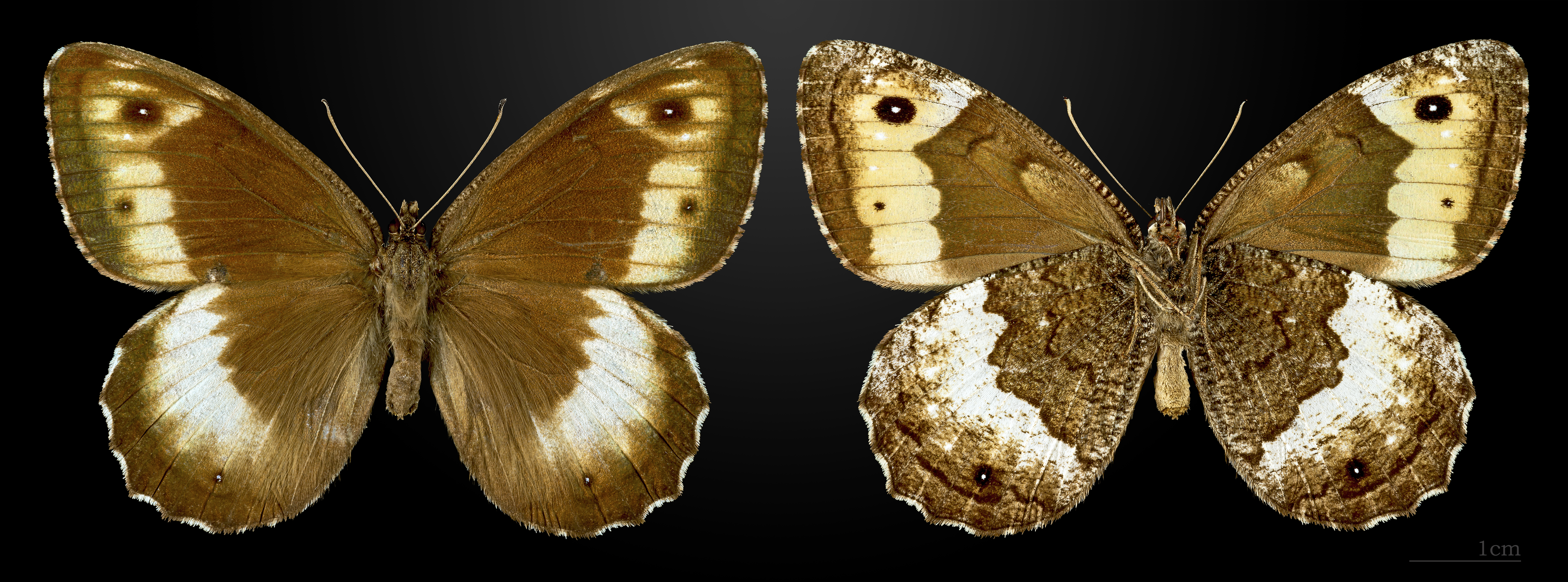

Scientific classification
- Kingdom: Animalia
- Phylum: Arthropoda
- Class: Insecta
- Order: Lepidoptera
- Family: Nymphalidae
- Genus: Hipparchia
- Species: H. hermione

Binomial name
- Hipparchia hermione (Linnaeus, 1764)

Synonyms
- Hipparchia alcyone [Denis & Schiffermüller], 1775

= Hipparchia hermione =

Species of butterfly

Hipparchia hermione, the rock grayling, is a butterfly of the family Nymphalidae. The species can be found in Central Europe, Southern Europe, Eastern Europe, North Africa, Anatolia and the Caucasus.

The wingspan is 27–34 millimetres (1.1–1.3 in).The ground colour is dark brown. There is a white submarginal band, bordered with an interrupted fringe and a large black ocellus at the apex of the forewing. The hindwing has a small ocellus with a very discrete pupil.

The underside of the forewing is similar: brown with a white submarginal band and the black ocellus with white pupil at the apex, while the hindwing is marbled with brown and white with a broad white band. No sexual dimorphism.

Similar to Hipparchia fagi, but on the underside the deep dark basal area of both wings contrasts much more sharply with the light band, and the latter, which is almost pure white on the hindwing, contrasts again conspicuously with the broad dark distal margin. The conspicuousness of the pattern on the underside of the hindwing is especially noticeable in the male, but even in the duller coloured female the band on the hindwing beneath is still quite distinct, although sparsely irrorated with black.

It is smaller than fagi.

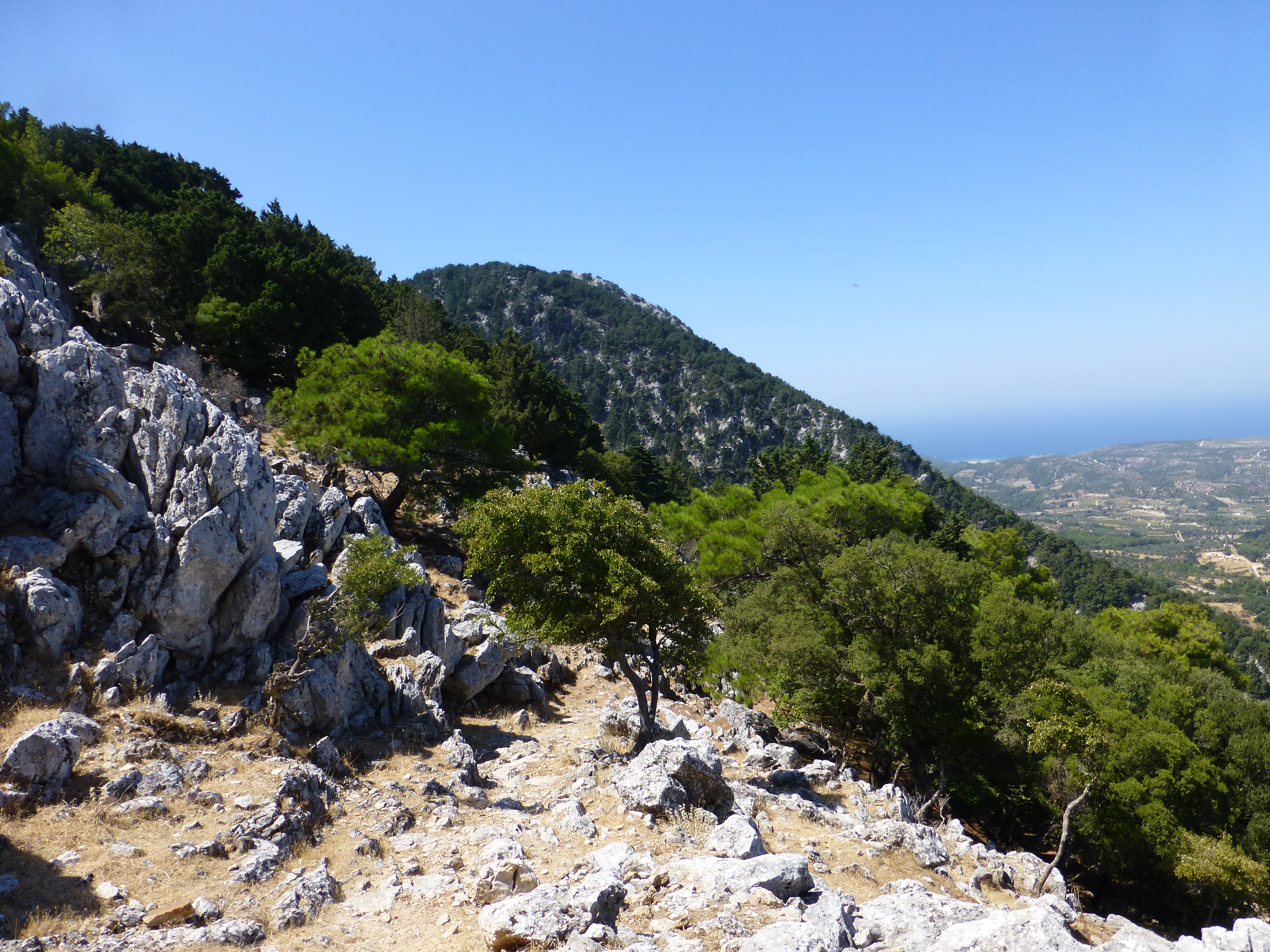
Habitat Rhodes

The butterflies fly from June to September on steep rocky slopes, in open forest, margins and forest clearings and in shrubland.

The larvae feed on various types of grass.
