= Von Uechtritz =

von Uechtritz is a surname. Notable people with the surname include:

- Cuno von Uechtritz-Steinkirch (1856–1908), German sculptor
- Rudolf von Uechtritz (1838–1886), German botanist
