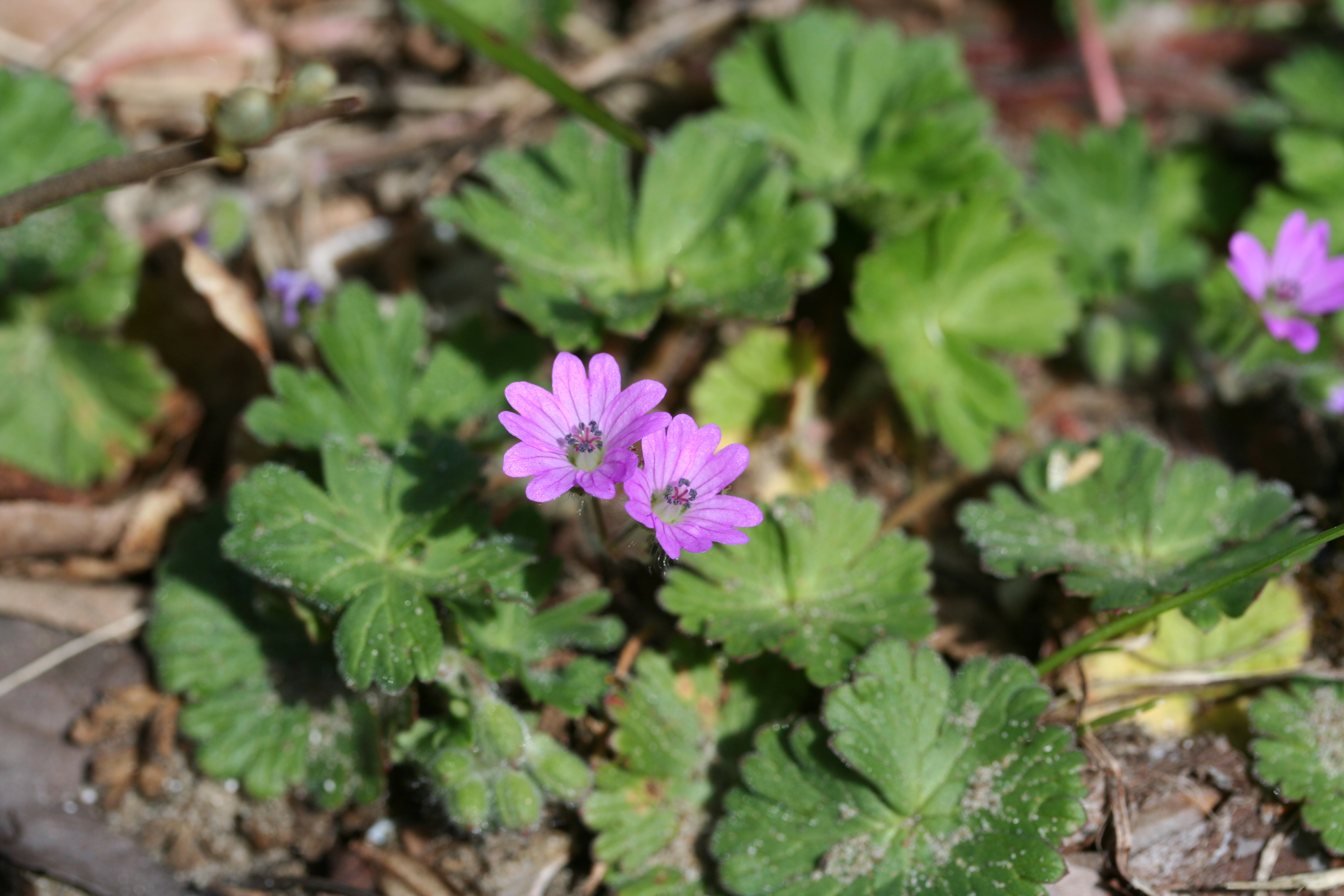

Scientific classification
- Kingdom: Plantae
- Clade: Tracheophytes
- Clade: Angiosperms
- Clade: Eudicots
- Clade: Rosids
- Order: Geraniales
- Family: Geraniaceae
- Genus: Geranium
- Species: G. molle

Binomial name
- Geranium molle L.

= Geranium molle =

Species of plant

Geranium molle, the dove's-foot crane's-bill or dovesfoot geranium, is an annual herbaceous plant of the family Geraniaceae.

== Description ==
Geranium molle is a small plant reaching on average 5–30 centimetres (2.0–11.8 in) in height. It is a very branched plant, quite hairy, with several ascending stems. The leaves are palmate, cut 5 to 9 times. The basal leaves are arranged in a rosette, the upper ones are sessile, rounded and hairy, with a long petiole of about 5–12 millimetres (0.20–0.47 in). The flowers are pinkish-purple, 8–12 mm in diameter, with very jagged petals. It blooms from April to September. The flowers are hermaphrodite and mainly pollinated by Hymenoptera. Fruits are glabrous, usually with 6-9 transverse ridges.

== Synonyms ==
- Geranium luganense Chenevard
- Geranium abortivum De Not. ex Ces.
- Geranium brutium [b] micranthum N.Terracc.
- Geranium brutium Gasp.
- Geranium calabrum Ten.
- Geranium leiocaulon Ledeb.
- Geranium x luganense Chenevard
- Geranium macropetalum (Boiss.) Posp.
- Geranium molle [a] triviale (A.Terracc.) Gortani & M.Gortani
- Geranium molle [b] caespitosum (N.Terracc.) Graebn.
- Geranium molle [b] leiocaulon (Ledeb.) Graebn.
- Geranium molle [B] pinguis (K.Malý) Graebn.
- Geranium molle [B] stipulare (Kunze) Graebn.
- Geranium molle [c] parvulum (Ten.) Graebn.
- Geranium molle f. albiflorum R.Uechtr.
- Geranium molle f. annuum (Schur) Gams
- Geranium molle f. candidum Beck
- Geranium molle f. pinguis K.Malý
- Geranium molle f. stipulare (Kunze) K.Malý
- Geranium molle f. subperenne (Schur) Gams
- Geranium molle [frm.] glabrata A.Terracc.
- Geranium molle [frm.] pygmaea A.Terracc.
- Geranium molle [frm.] sepincola A.Terracc.
- Geranium molle [frm.] tenuisecta A.Terracc.
- Geranium molle [frm.] trivialis A.Terracc.
- Geranium molle [frm.] villosissima A.Terracc.
- Geranium molle [I] annuum (Schur) Graebn.
- Geranium molle [I] triviale A.Terrac. ex Graebn.
- Geranium molle [II] subperenne (Schur) Graebn.
- Geranium molle [II] tenuisecta (A.Terracc.) Graebn.
- Geranium molle [l] album (Picard) Graebn.
- Geranium molle [l] suaveolens (Boenn. ex Rchb.) Graebn.
- Geranium molle subf. abortiva (De Not. ex Cesati) A.Terracc.
- Geranium molle subsp. brutium (Gasp.) Graebn.
- Geranium molle subsp. brutium (Gasp.) P.H.Davis
- Geranium molle subsp. normale A.Terracc.
- Geranium molle subsp. pollinense A.Terracc.
- Geranium molle subsp. sinjaricum Al-Shehbaz & Al-Khakani
- Geranium molle subsp. stipulare (Kunze) Dostál
- Geranium molle subsp. stipulare (Kunze) Holmboe
- Geranium molle subsp. stipulare (Kunze) Soó
- Geranium molle subsp. villosum (Ten.) A.Terracc.
- Geranium molle subvar. macropetalum (Boiss.) Gams
- Geranium molle var. abortivum (De Not. ex Ces.) Ces., Pass. & Gibelli
- Geranium molle var. abortivum (De Not. ex Ces.) Nyman
- Geranium molle var. album Picard
- Geranium molle var. annuum Schur
- Geranium molle var. arenarium A.Terracc.
- Geranium molle var. brutium (Gasp.) K.Malý
- Geranium molle var. caespitosum N.Terracc.
- Geranium molle var. caucasicum Regel ex Woronow
- Geranium molle var. corymbiferum Just.
- Geranium molle var. diffusum Ten. ex A.Terracc.
- Geranium molle var. elatum Ten. ex A.Terracc.
- Geranium molle var. graecum A.Terracc.
- Geranium molle var. grandiflorum Lange
- Geranium molle var. grandiflorum Lojac.
- Geranium molle var. grandiflorum Vis.
- Geranium molle var. grandiflorum Viv.
- Geranium molle var. lucanum Gasp. ex Nyman
- Geranium molle var. macropetalum Boiss.
- Geranium molle var. maioriflorum Borbás
- Geranium molle var. maritimum Lojac.
- Geranium molle var. minus Chevall.
- Geranium molle var. montanum A.Terracc.
- Geranium molle var. montanum A.Terracc. ex N.Terracc.
- Geranium molle var. parvulum Ten.
- Geranium molle var. stipulare (Kunze) Nyman
- Geranium molle var. suaveolens Boenn. ex Rchb.
- Geranium molle var. suaveolens (Boenn. ex Rchb.) Gams
- Geranium molle var. subperenne Schur
- Geranium molle var. supinum Fouc. & Jouss.
- Geranium molle var. typicum Posp.
- Geranium molle var. villosum (Ten.) Cout.
- Geranium molle var. vulcanicum A.Terracc.
- Geranium x oenense Borbás ex Hallier
- Geranium pollinense N.Terracc. ex A.Terracc.
- Geranium pseudovillosum Schur
- Geranium punctatum Kanitz
- Geranium pyrenaicum subsp. villosum (Ten.) Nyman
- Geranium stipulare Kunze
- Geranium villosum var. gracile Sennen
- Geranium villosum var. villosissimum Ten.
- Geranium villosum Ten.

== Distribution and habitat ==
It is native to the Mediterranean and sub-Mediterranean areas, but has naturalized in other parts of Europe, in southwestern and central Asia and in North Africa, though it may have already been in those parts and areas, just not properly identified. It is considered an introduced species in North America, where it is known as Dovefoot Geranium or Awnless Geranium. Although non-native in parts of its range, this species poses little threat to native ecosystems.

It is found in dry meadows, hedges, banks and forest edges. It prefers sunny places on sandy and relatively dry soils, at an altitude of 0–1,000 metres (0–3,281 ft) above sea level.

== Herbal medicine ==
Nicholas Culpeper in his herbal of 1652 suggested a variety of uses for G. molle, including the treatment of internal and external injuries. A note was made that the bruised leaf healed external injuries faster. A decoction in wine was said to relieve gout and other joint pains.

== Gallery ==
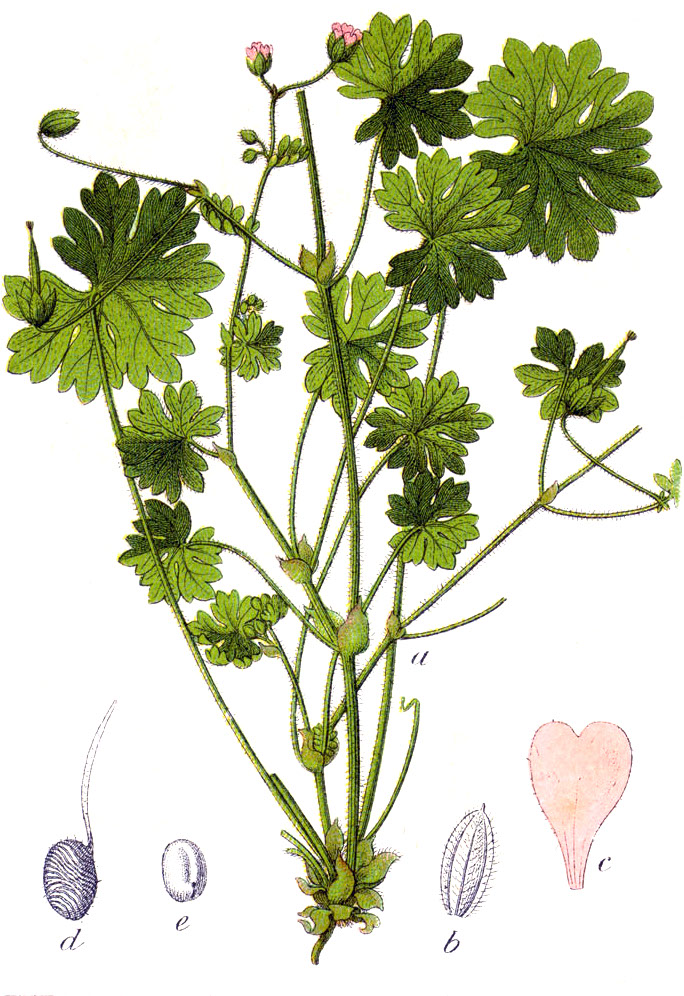
Figure from Deutschlands Flora in Abbildungen, 1796

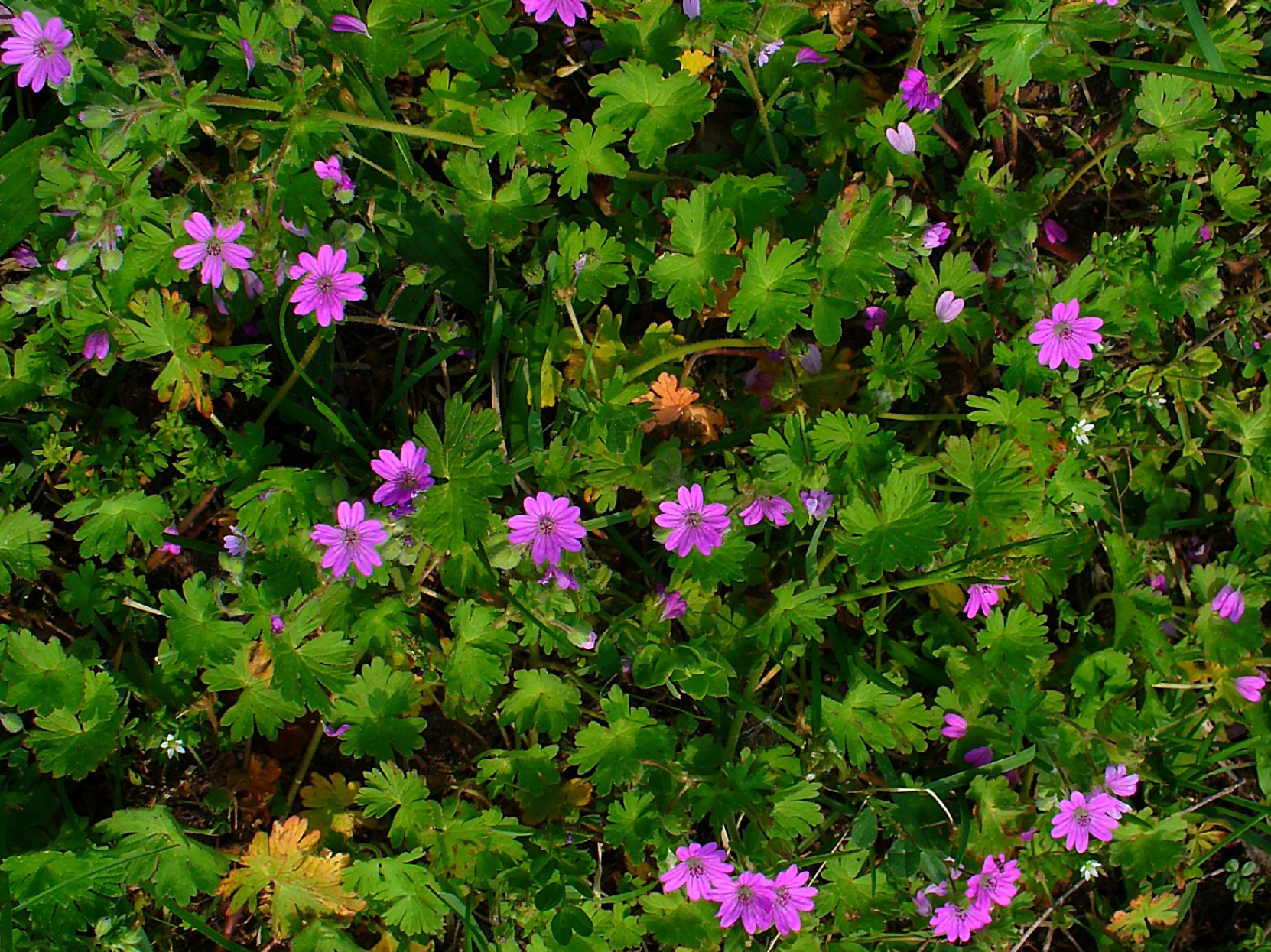
Plant of Geranium molle

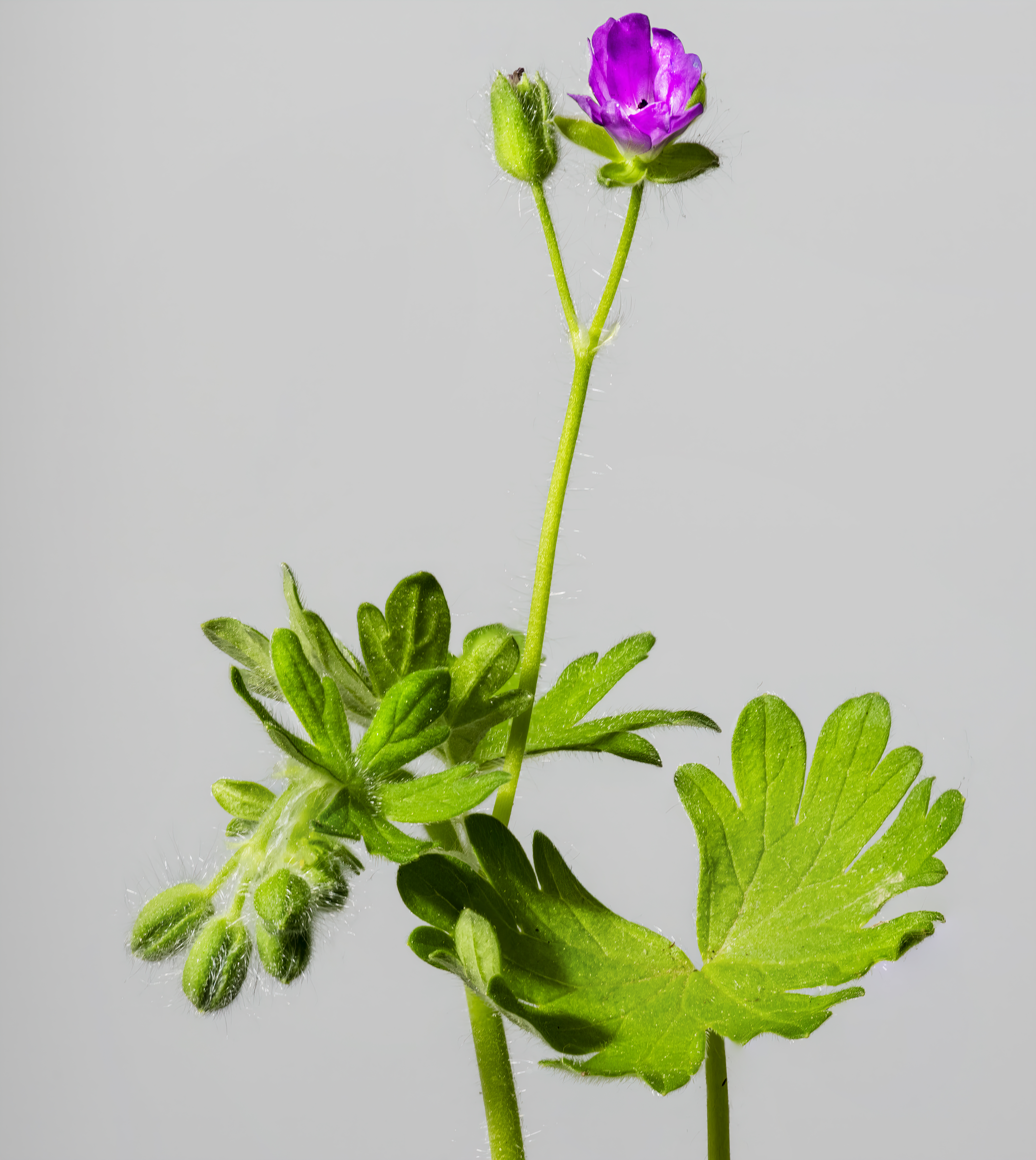
Leaves, buds, flower

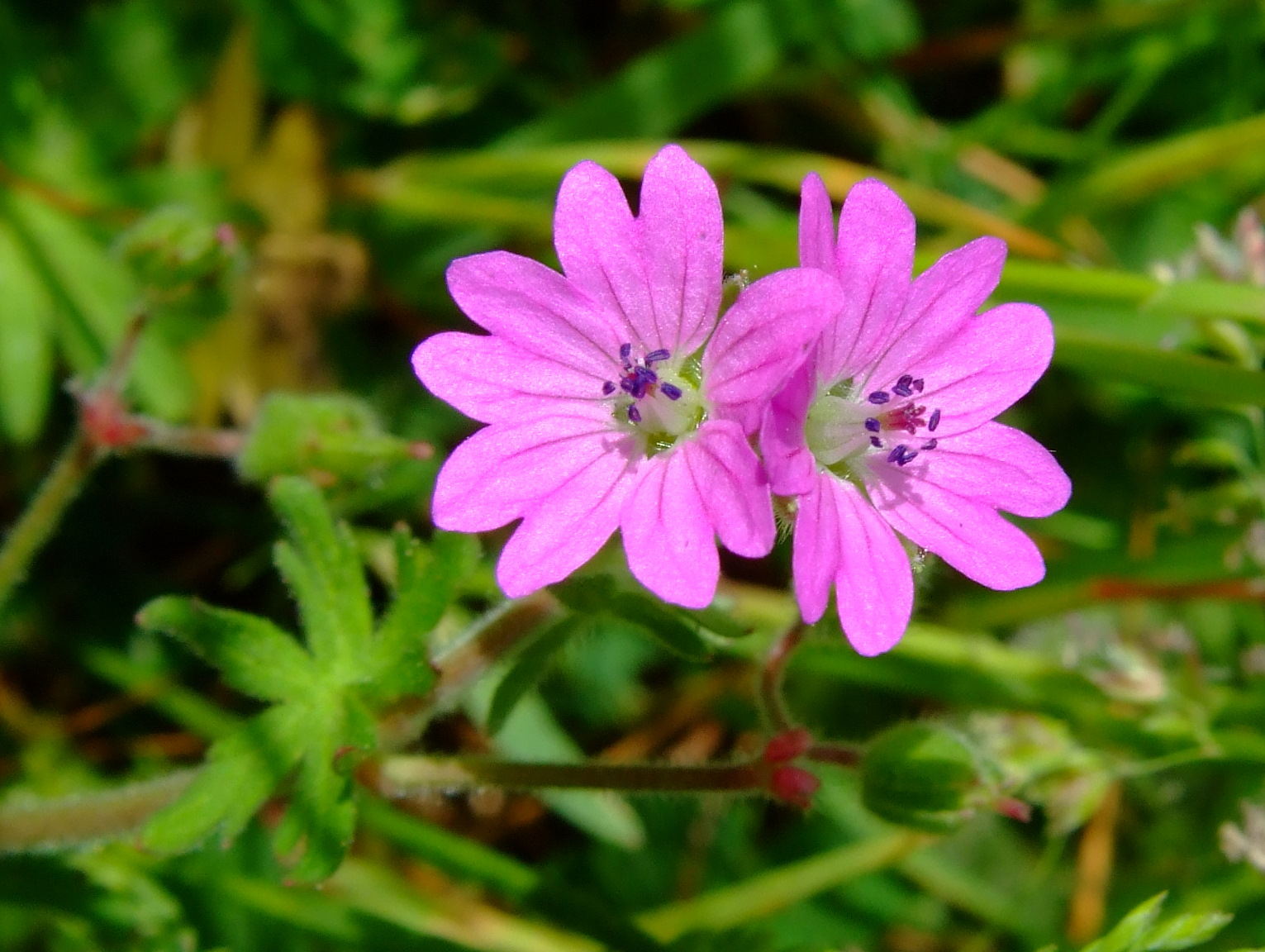
Flowers of Geranium molle

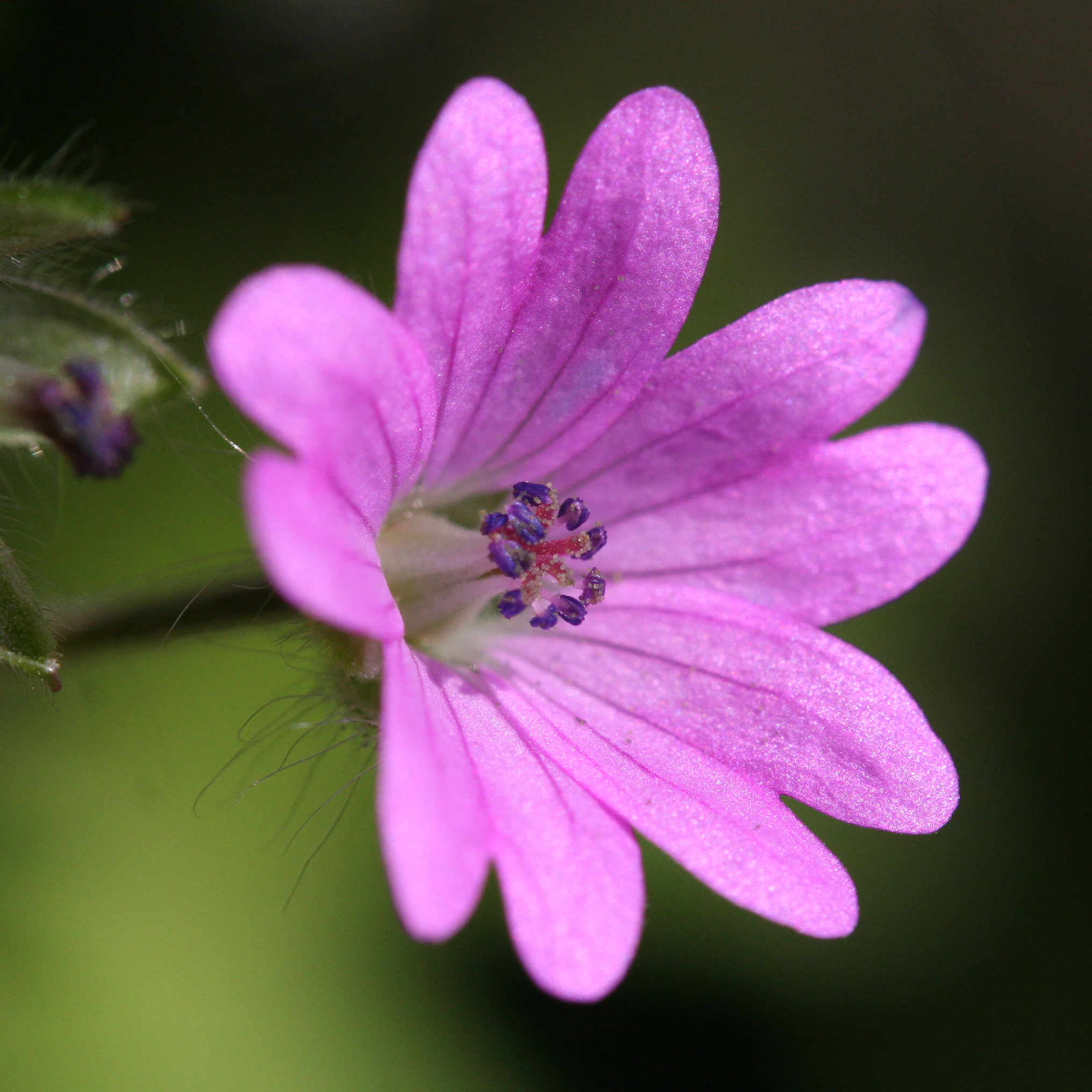
Close-up of a flower of Geranium molle

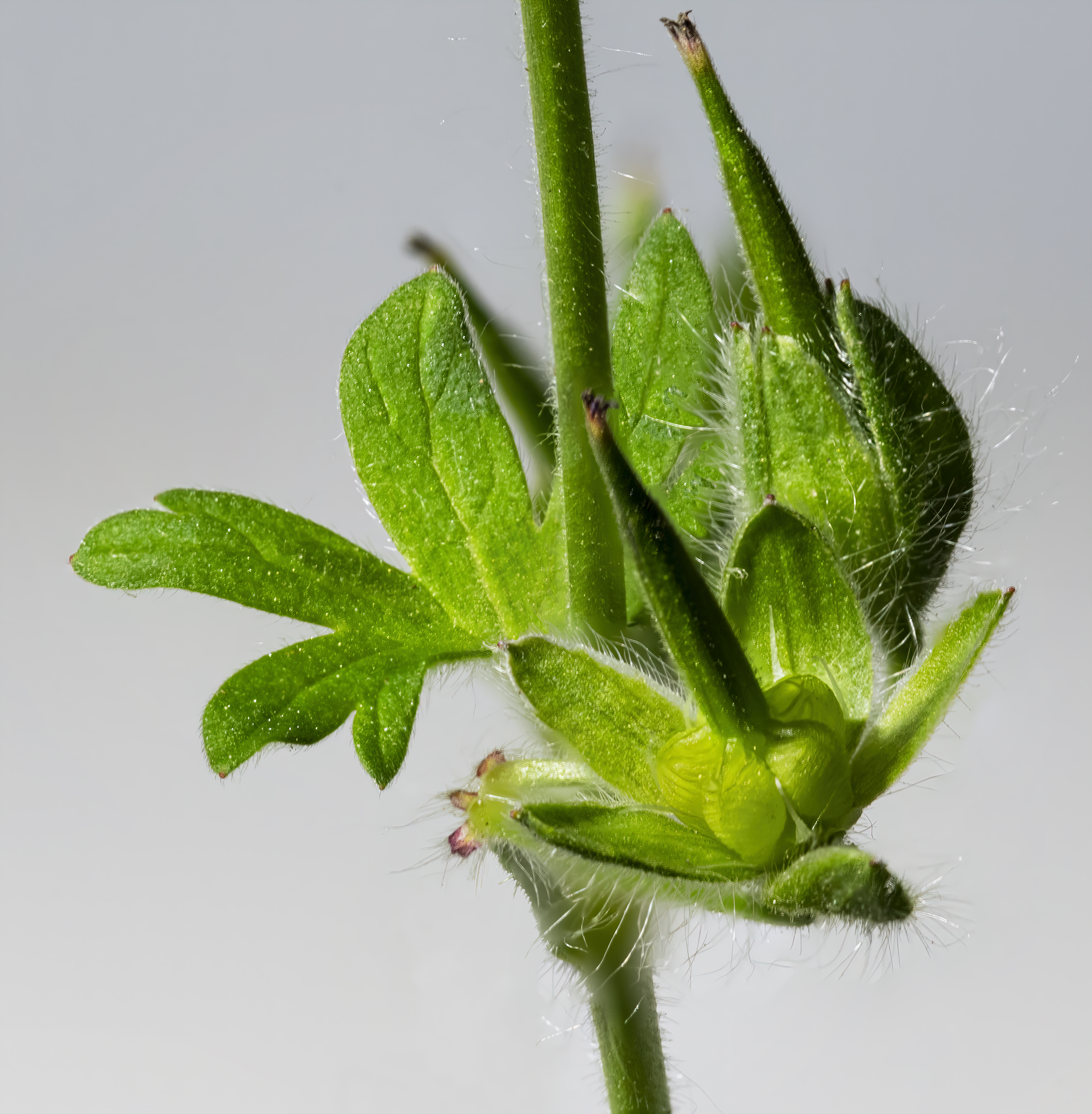
Immature fruit

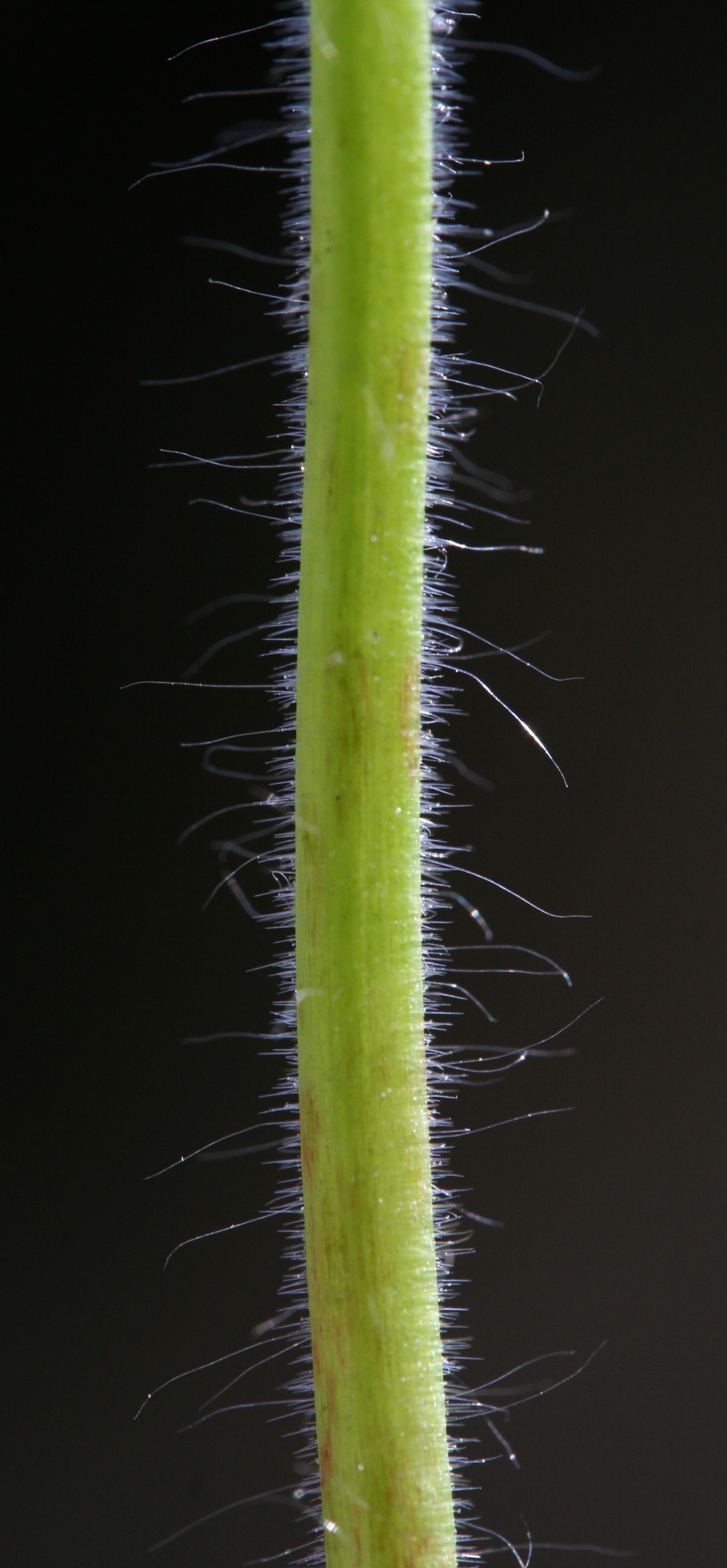
Hairy stem of Geranium molle

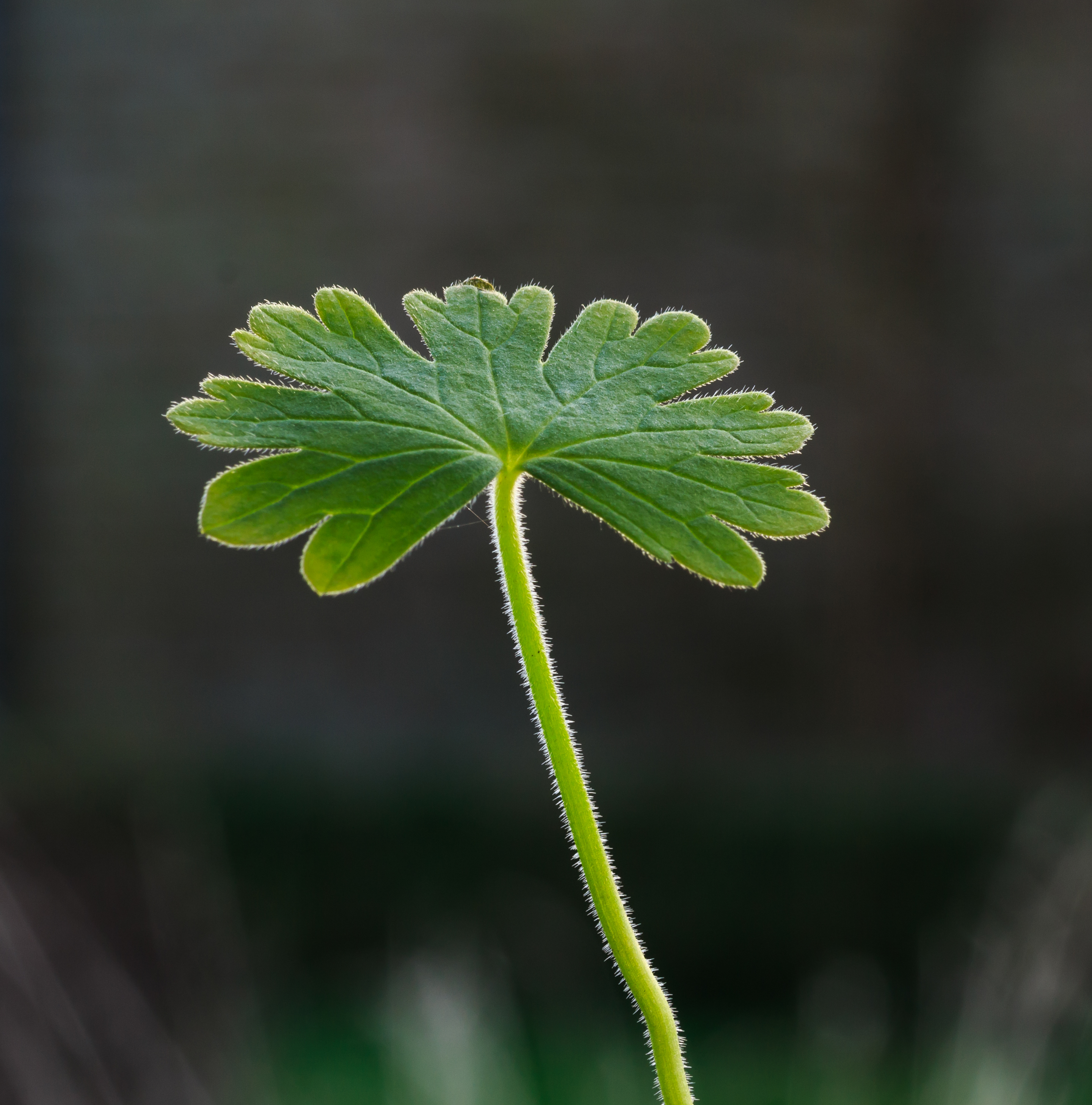
Young leaves of Geranium molle var. Brutium.

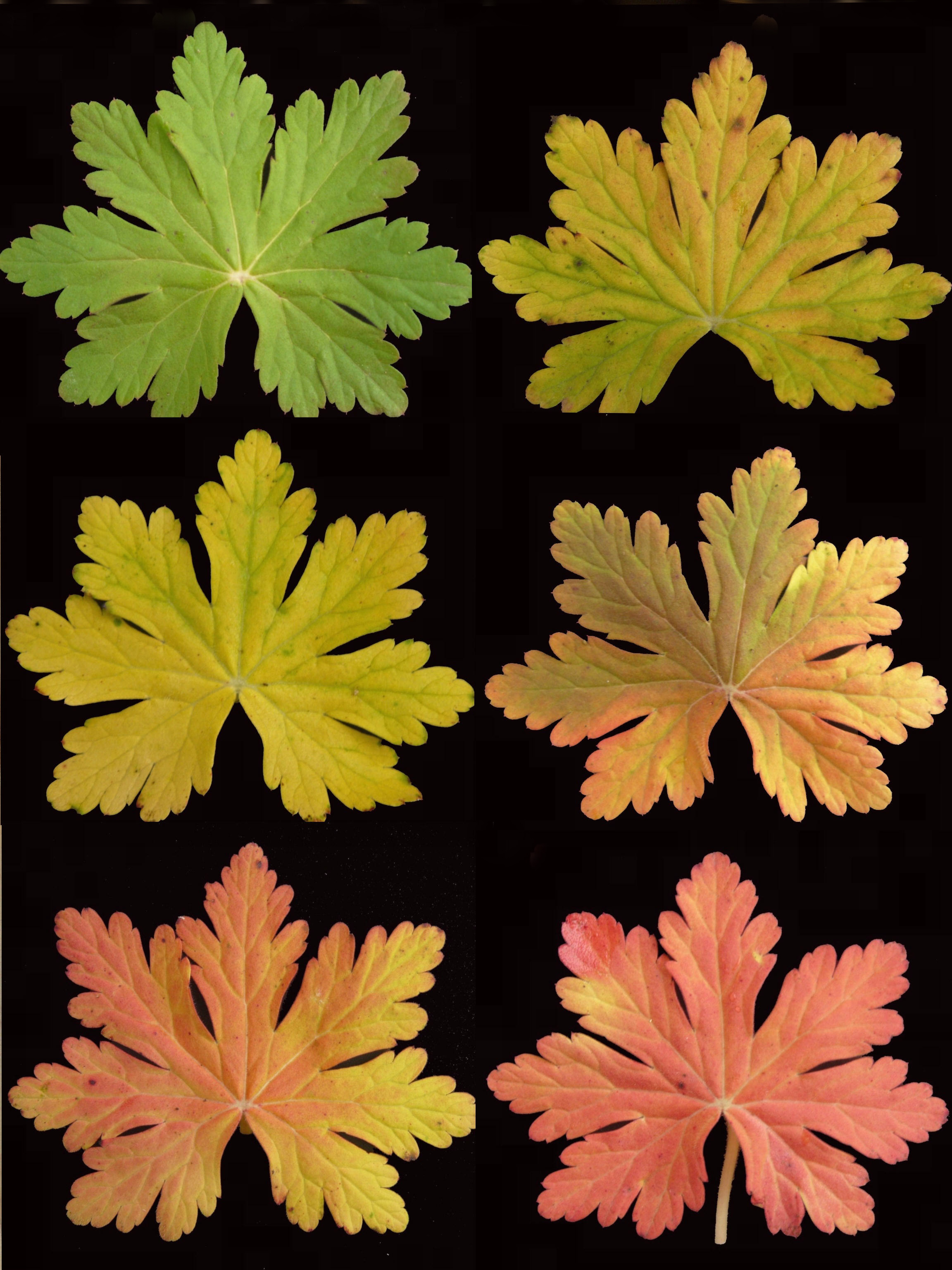
Leaf colouring from spring (top left) to autumn (bottom right)
