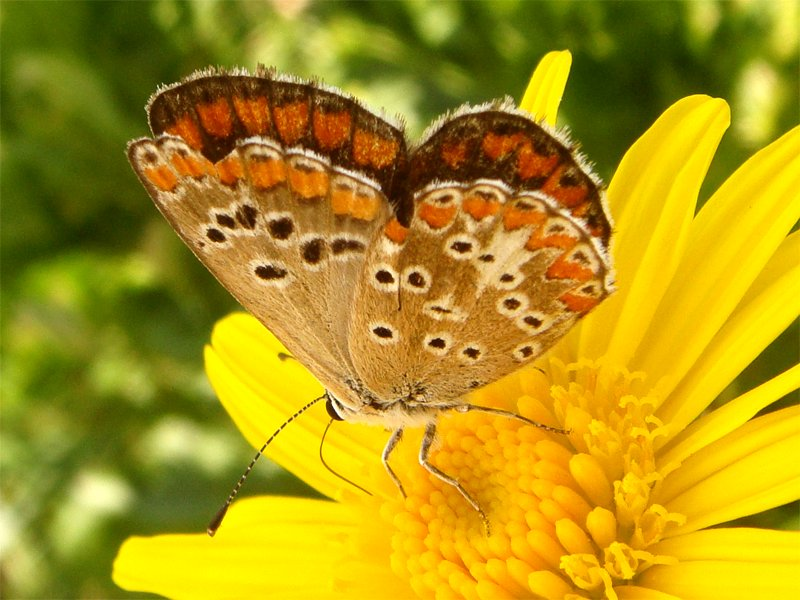

Scientific classification
- Kingdom: Animalia
- Phylum: Arthropoda
- Clade: Pancrustacea
- Class: Insecta
- Order: Lepidoptera
- Family: Lycaenidae
- Genus: Aricia
- Species: A. cramera

Binomial name
- Aricia cramera Eschscholtz, 1821

Synonyms
- Plebejus cramera; Lycaena cramera; Lycaena astrarche ab. ornata; Lycaena astrarche ab. sebdouica; Lycaena agestis ornata f. lilliputana; Aricia cramera pallidecanariensis; Aricia cramera pallidecramera

= Aricia cramera =

Southern brown argus

Species of butterfly

Aricia cramera, the southern brown argus, is a butterfly of the family Lycaenidae. It is a butterfly of Southern Europe and North Africa and can be found from Morocco and Tunisia up to Spain and Portugal, on Mediterranean islands including Menorca and on the Canary Islands.

The wingspan ranges up to 30 mm. The butterfly flies from May to September depending on the location.

The larvae feed on Erodium, Helianthemum and Geranium species.

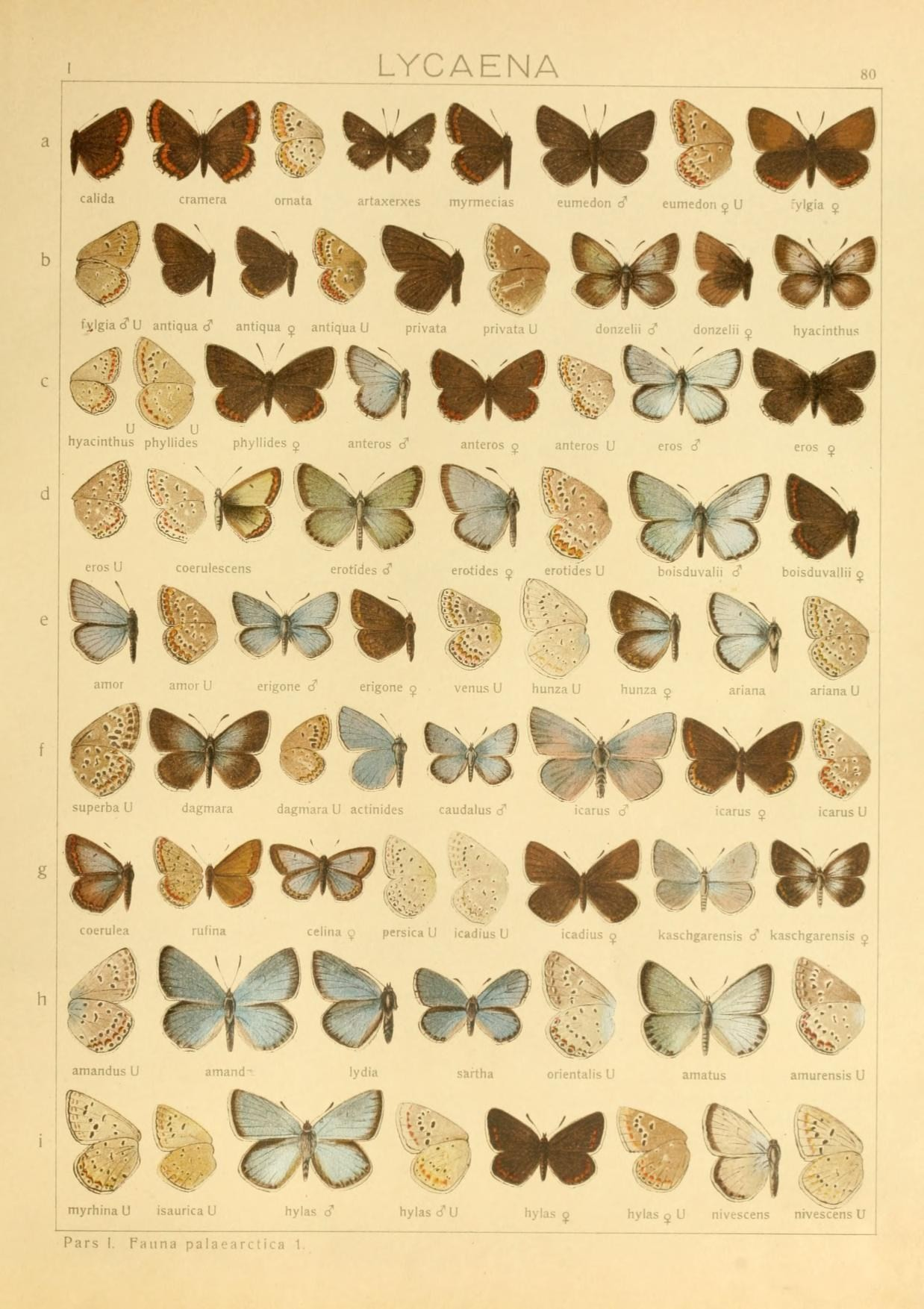
Seitz 80a

== Description from Seitz ==
In specimens [ of astrarche ] from the Canaries the red macular band of the upperside is occasionally quite uncommonly broad and of even width, so that it forms a regular band, only transected by the black veins; this is ab. cramera Eschsch. (= canariensis Black.) (80 a). I also caught very extreme specimens of this form on the slopes of the Aures Mts. in Algeria, although only singly; on the other hand I met on the Canaries with specimens of astrarche which certainly did not belong to cramera, but rather to calida.

== See also ==
- List of butterflies of Menorca
