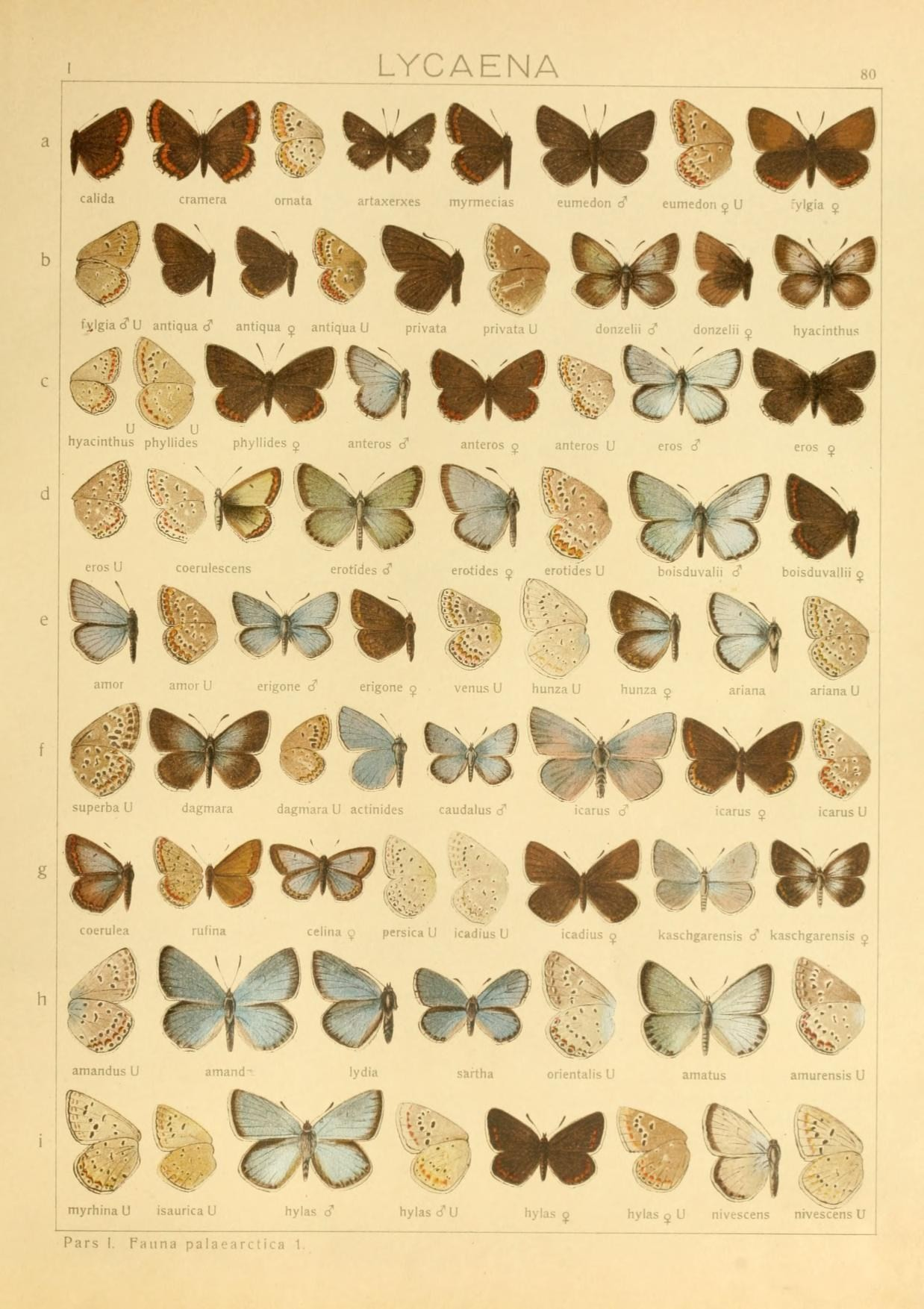
- Aricia chinensis myrmecias in Seitz 80a

Scientific classification
- Domain: Eukaryota
- Kingdom: Animalia
- Phylum: Arthropoda
- Class: Insecta
- Order: Lepidoptera
- Family: Lycaenidae
- Subfamily: Polyommatinae
- Tribe: Polyommatini
- Subtribe: Polyommatina
- Genus: Aricia
- Species: A. chinensis

Binomial name
- Aricia chinensis (Murray, [1874])

= Aricia chinensis =

Species of butterfly

Aricia chinensis is a small butterfly found in the East Palearctic (Central Asia (mountains), Mongolia, West China, Central China, Northeast China, Korea) that belongs to the lycaenids or blues family.

== Description from Seitz ==
Above like astrarche, but the fringes spotted. Beneath the reddish yellow submarginal band is neither interrupted nor proximally dentate, being edged with short black lunules and standing somewhat further away from the margin. In North China and Manchuria. — myrmecias Christ. (80 a) is a form from Turkestan with the macular band pale yellow instead of reddish yellow. In May, found on flowers of Centaurea. The larva feeds on Leguminosae.

== Subspecies ==
- A. c. chinensis Transbaikalia, Amur, Ussuri, NE.China
- A. c. sibiricana (Kozhanchikov, 1928) South Siberia (West of Baikal)
- A. c. myrmecias (Christoph, 1877) Turan

== See also ==
- List of butterflies of Russia
