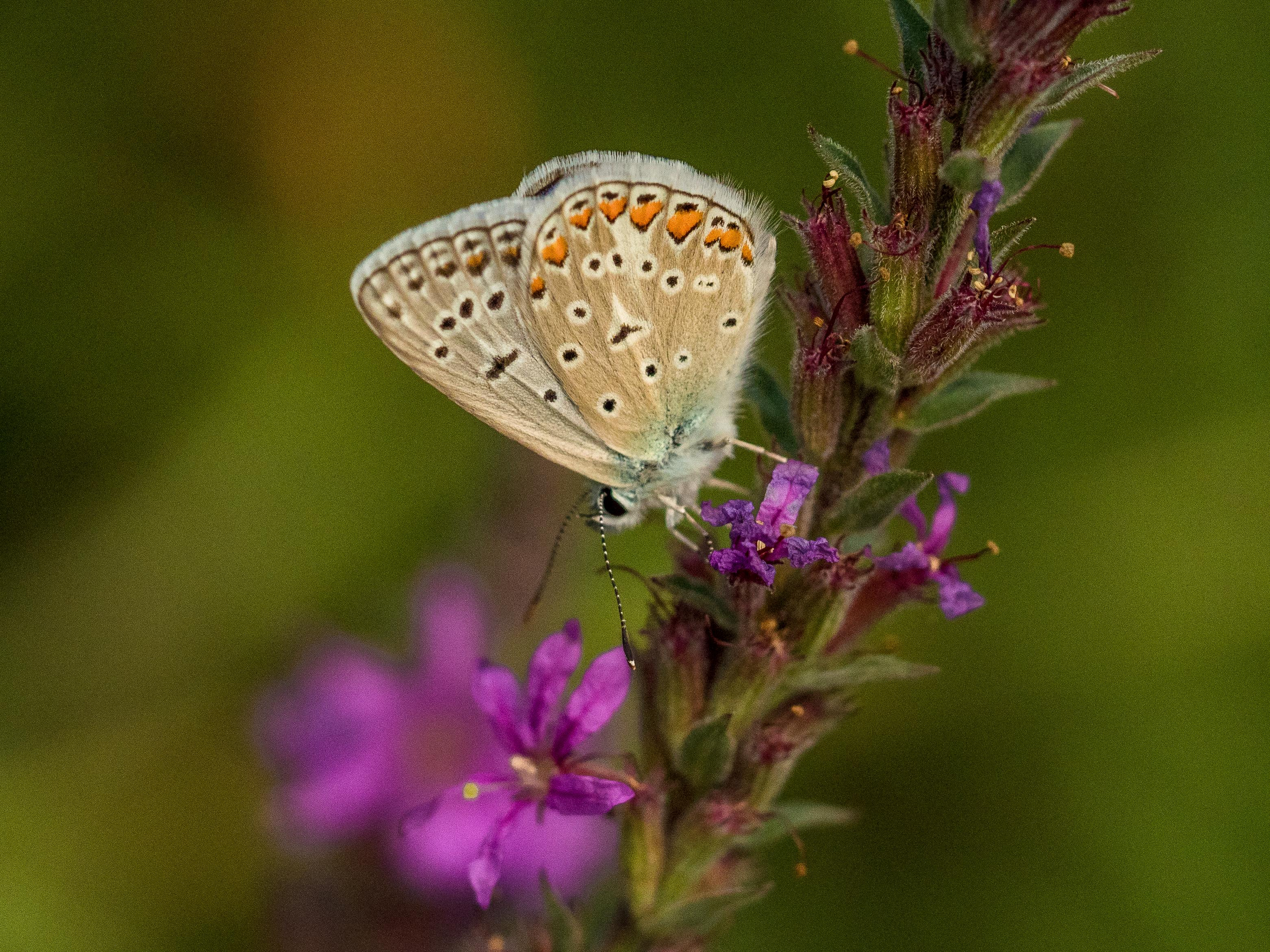
- in Turkey

Scientific classification
- Domain: Eukaryota
- Kingdom: Animalia
- Phylum: Arthropoda
- Class: Insecta
- Order: Lepidoptera
- Family: Lycaenidae
- Genus: Aricia
- Species: A. hyacinthus

Binomial name
- Aricia hyacinthus (Herrich-Schäffer, [1847])

= Aricia hyacinthus =

Species of butterfly

Aricia hyacinthus, the Anatolian false argus, is a butterfly of the family Lycaenidae. It is found in Asia Minor and around the Levant Sea.

== Description from Seitz ==
L. hyacinthus H.-Schiff. (80 b, c). Above similar to the preceding [donzelii] the dark margin still broader, especially on the hindwing. Very different on the underside, being light blue-grey with rust-red marginal spots, distinct ocelli and on the hindwing without distinct white median smear. — From the countries around the eastern part of the Black Sea.
