= Pospíchal =

Pospíchal (feminine Pospíchalová) is a Czech surname. Notable people with the surname include:

- Bohuslav Pospíchal, Czech slalom canoer
- Eduard Pospichal (1838–1905), Austrian botanist
- Tomáš Pospíchal (1936–2003), Czech footballer
