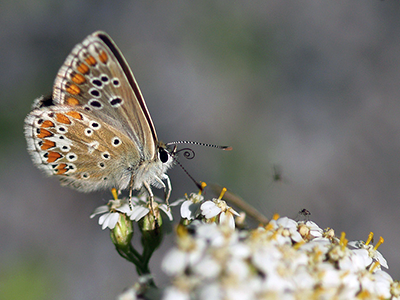

Conservation status
- Least Concern (IUCN 3.1)

Scientific classification
- Kingdom: Animalia
- Phylum: Arthropoda
- Class: Insecta
- Order: Lepidoptera
- Family: Lycaenidae
- Genus: Aricia
- Species: A. montensis

Binomial name
- Aricia montensis Verity, 1928

= Aricia montensis =

Species of butterfly

Aricia montensis, is a species of butterfly in the family Lycaenidae. It is found in the mountains of Spain and North Africa.

The larvae feed on Erodium, Helianthemum and Geranium species.
