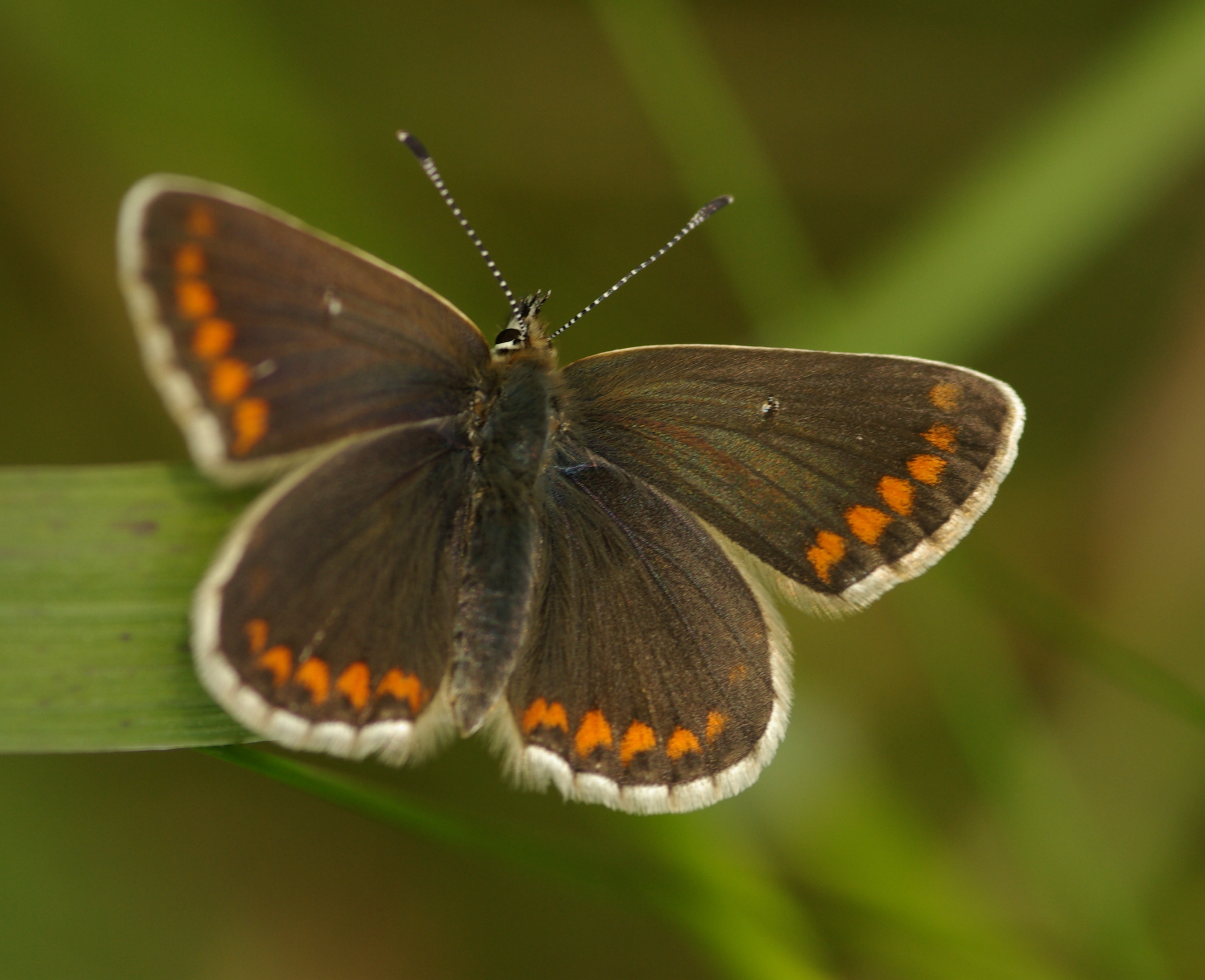
- Northern brown argus (Aricia artaxerxes)

Scientific classification
- Domain: Eukaryota
- Kingdom: Animalia
- Phylum: Arthropoda
- Class: Insecta
- Order: Lepidoptera
- Family: Lycaenidae
- Subfamily: Polyommatinae
- Tribe: Polyommatini
- Subtribe: Polyommatina
- Genus: Aricia; Reichenbach, 1817

Synonyms
- Gymnomorphia Verity, 1929; Pseudoaricia Beuret, 1959; Ultraaricia Beuret, 1959; Umpria Zhdanko, 1994

= Aricia (butterfly) =

Genus of butterflies

Aricia is a genus of butterflies in the family Lycaenidae. The genus was erected by Ludwig Reichenbach in 1817.

== Species ==
Listed alphabetically within groups:

- agestis group:
  - Aricia agestis ([Denis & Schiffermüller], 1775) – brown argus
  - Aricia artaxerxes (Fabricius, 1793) – northern brown argus
  - Aricia cramera (Eschscholtz, 1821) – southern brown argus
  - Aricia montensis Verity, 1928
- anteros group:
  - Aricia anteros (Freyer, 1838) – blue argus
  - Aricia bassoni Larsen, 1974
  - Aricia crassipuncta (Christoph, 1893)
  - Aricia morronensis (Ribbe, 1910) – Spanish argus
  - Aricia vandarbani (Pfeiffer, 1937)
- chinensis group:
  - Aricia chinensis (Murray, 1874)
- nicias group:
  - Aricia dorsumstellae (Graves, 1923)
  - Aricia hyacinthus (Herrich-Schäffer, [1847])
  - Aricia isaurica (Staudinger, 1871)
  - Aricia nicias (Meigen, 1829) – silvery argus
  - Aricia teberdina (Sheljuzhko, 1934)
  - Aricia torulensis Hesselbarth & Siepe, 1993
