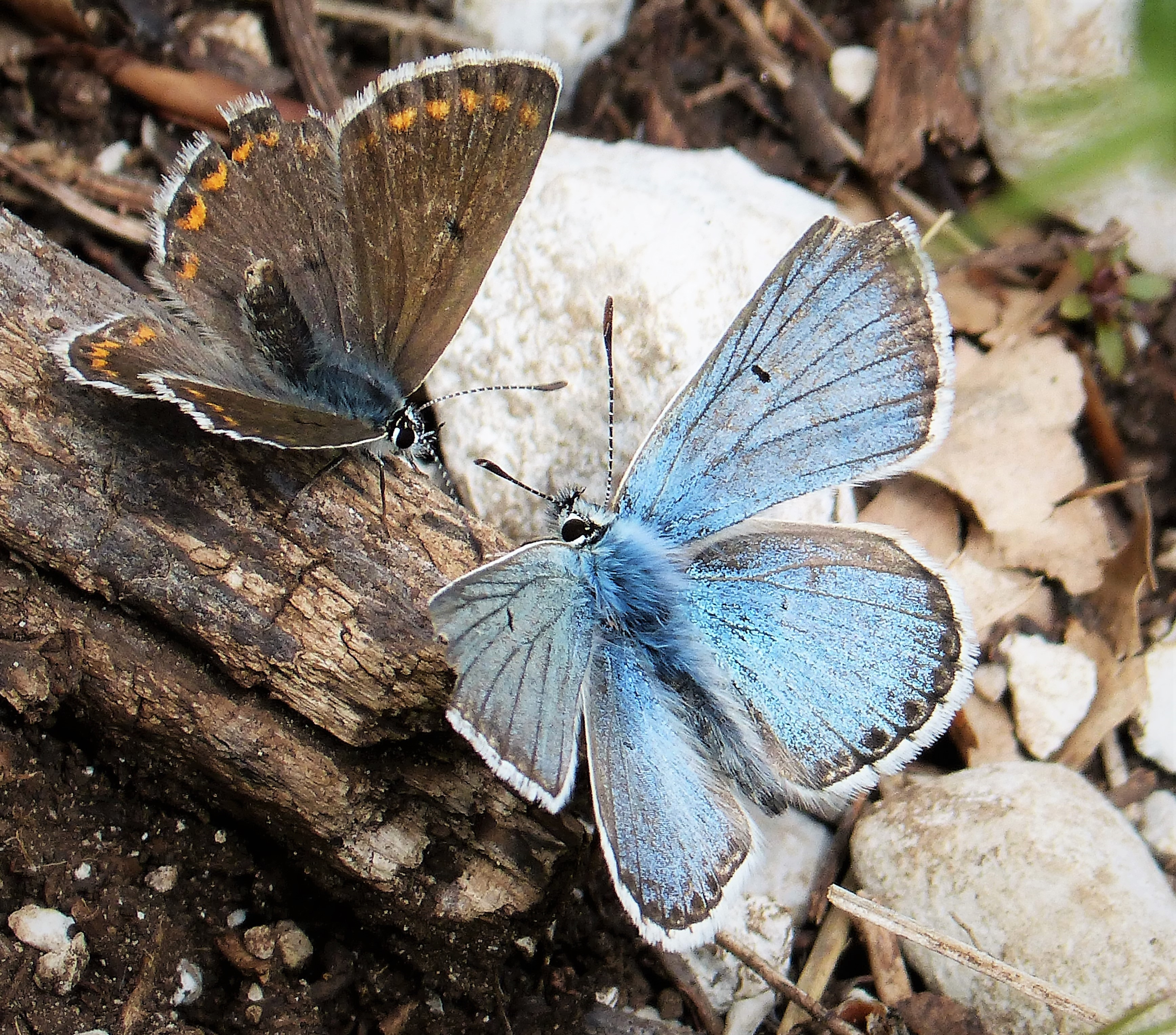
- Courting pair

Scientific classification
- Domain: Eukaryota
- Kingdom: Animalia
- Phylum: Arthropoda
- Class: Insecta
- Order: Lepidoptera
- Family: Lycaenidae
- Genus: Aricia
- Species: A. anteros

Binomial name
- Aricia anteros (Freyer, 1838)

= Aricia anteros =

Blue argus

Species of butterfly

Aricia anteros, the blue argus, is a European butterfly in the family Lycaenidae. It has a wingspan of 30–34 mm. In Europe it can be found in Macedonia, Albania, Greece, Bulgaria, Serbia, Croatia, Montenegro, Bosnia and Herzegovina, Romania, Ukraine and in Turkey. Its primary larval food plants are Geranium sanguineum and Geranium macrorrhizum .

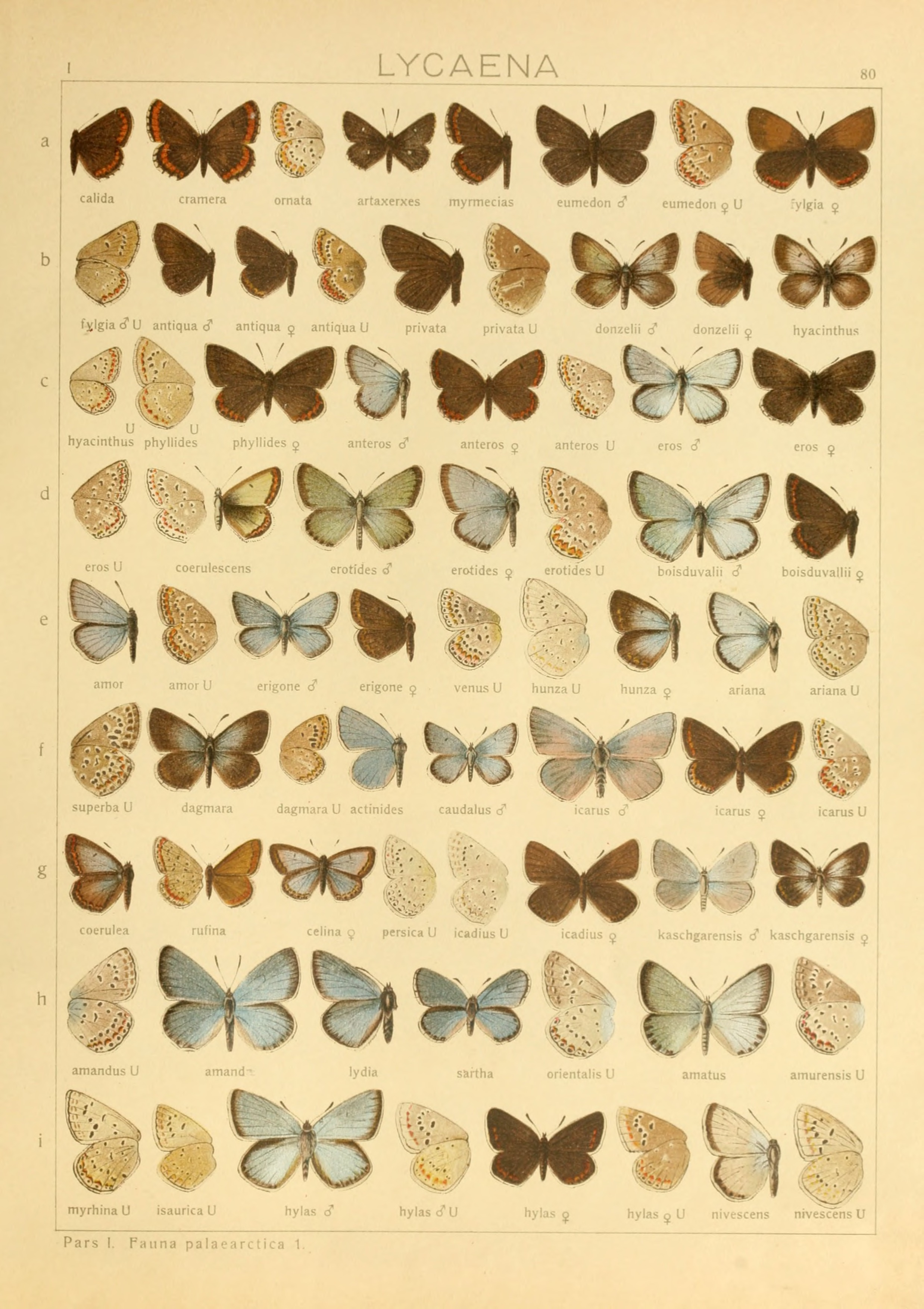
A. anteros in Seitz (80 c)

== Description from Seitz ==
The males dusted with a very bright metallic blue as far as the narrow black margin, with a small but distinct discocellular spot on the forewing. Male resembling astrarche above, the female on both sides, but the underside with more prominent and larger spots, the discal row of ocelli on the forewing more curved. Especially on the Balkan Peninsula, in Asia Minor and Syria. European specimens bear often some small red spots on the upperside of the hindwing before the outer margin; this is ab. pupillata Aign. — crassipunctata Christ. are Armenian specimens with the discocellular spot of the forewing above much enlarged. — Not rare in June and July, in Europe often restricted to the mountains.
