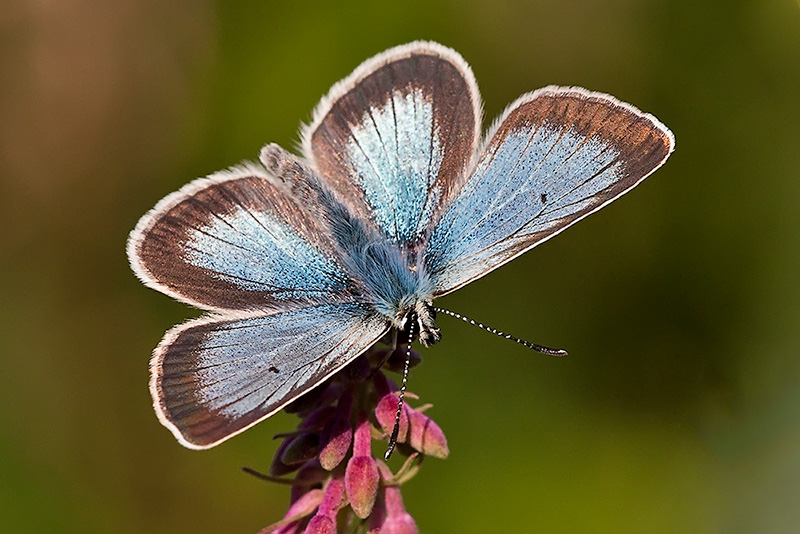

Scientific classification
- Kingdom: Animalia
- Phylum: Arthropoda
- Clade: Pancrustacea
- Class: Insecta
- Order: Lepidoptera
- Family: Lycaenidae
- Genus: Aricia
- Species: A. nicias

Binomial name
- Aricia nicias Meigen, 1830

Synonyms
- Polyommatus nicias Meigen, 1829; Argus donzelii Boisduval, 1832; Pseudoaricia nicias (Meigen, 1829); Plebeius nicias (Meigen, 1829); Plebejus nicias (Meigen, 1829); Pseudoaricia nicias Meigen, 1830; Plebejus nicias

= Aricia nicias =

Silvery argus

Species of butterfly

Aricia nicias, the silvery argus, is a butterfly of the family Lycaenidae. It is found in the Alps, Pyrenees and from Scandinavia ranging to Siberia and the north of Mongolia.

The wingspan is 25–28 mm. The butterfly flies from May to August depending on the location.

The larvae feed on Geranium species.

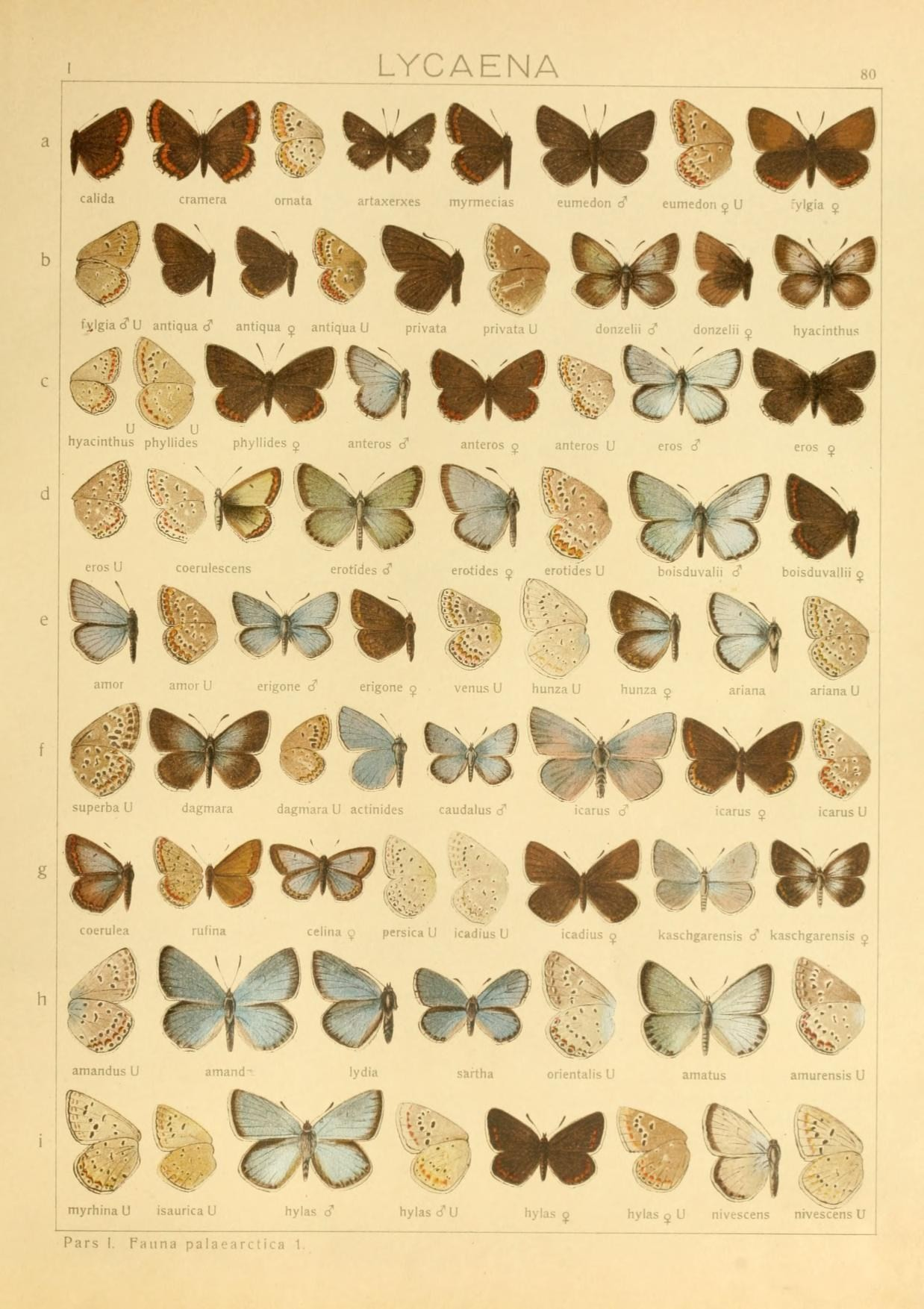
Seitz 80b

== Description from Seitz ==
L. donzelii Bdv. (80 b). Scarcely so large as the smallest eumedon. Above black-brown with dark discocellular spot and grey-brown fringes; in the male the upperside dusted with metallic blue-green, with the exception of a very broad marginal area, which remains black. Underside grey, the ocelli being but little prominent, on the hindwing almost obsolescent; from the base of the hindwing to near the centre of the outer margin a wedge-shaped white streak. In the high Alps and in the north of Europe, as well as in some of the Asiatic mountain-ranges (Ural, Tian-shan). — Specimens from East Russia (Kasan) are smaller, with narrower border, above more greenish and beneath with a very feebly developed reddish yellow band; this is septentrionalis Krulik. — Egg flattened, pure white, deposited on Geranium in July. The larva emerges early in the spring and feeds in the stalks and buds; full-grown pale olive-green, covered with short, whitish silky hair, on the sides three stripes darker than the ground and on the back a stripe yet darker than these; the lower side-stripes are so arranged that the lowest of one segment is a continuation of the next higher of the preceding segments; the sides reddish at the stigmata, white at the outer edge. Pupa pale olive-green with dark dorsal stripe, the wing-cases very transparent, bearing a minute reddish network and small thin white hairs; fastened low down at the stalks of Geranium (Mc Dunnough). The butterflies are on the wing in July and August, and very closely resemble L. eumedon in their habits of flight, feeding, etc., but are far less plentiful. They occur only singly, usually resting quietly on a high- grown flower of Geranium; when disturbed they settle again after a short while on the same or a neighbouring blossom. Also this species is met with only in single specimens among the crowds of Alpine Blues drinking at puddles, and generally only at a considerable altitude (Stilfser Joch, Zermatt, Simplon, Maloya, etc.)
