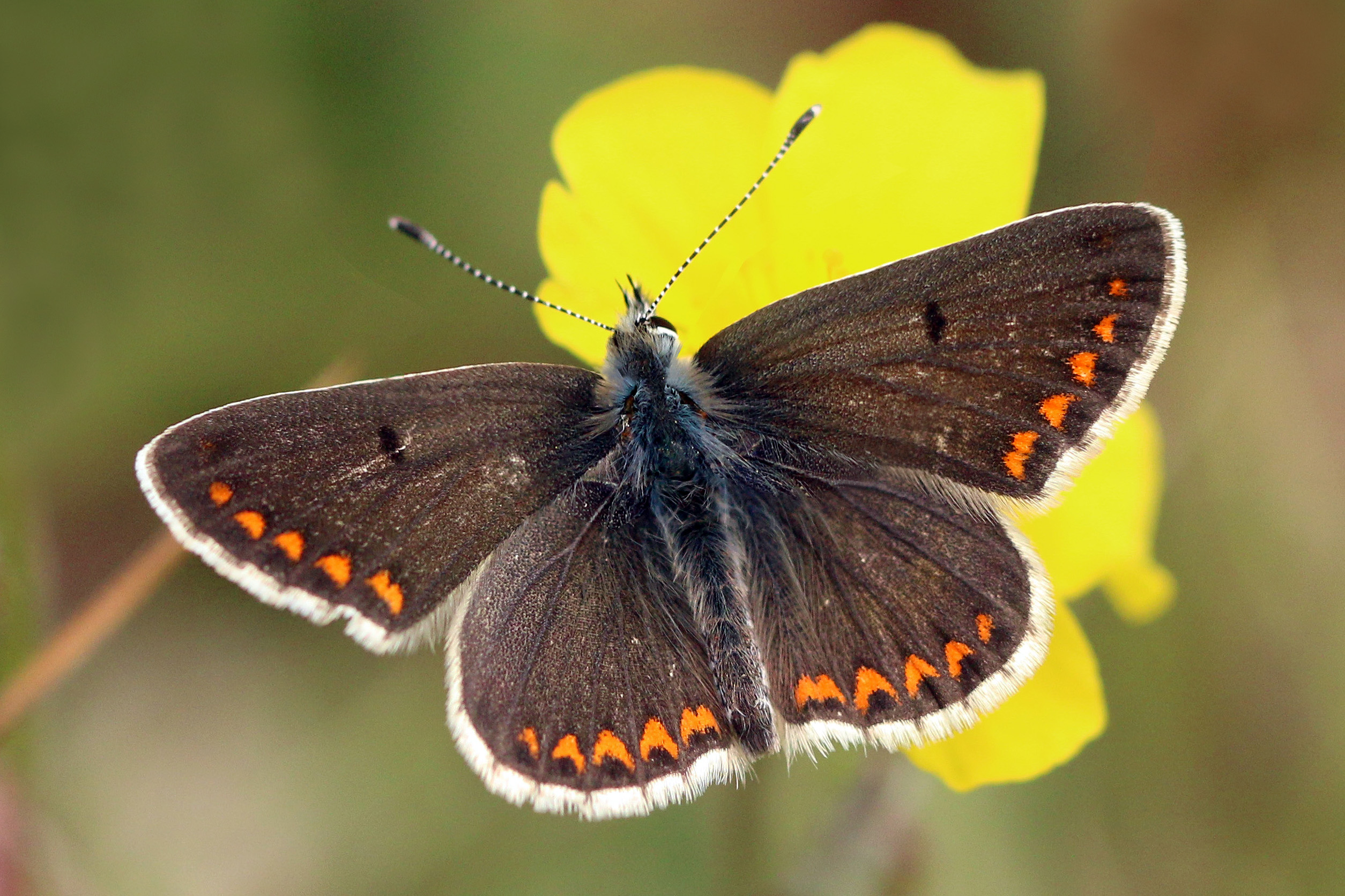
- Male
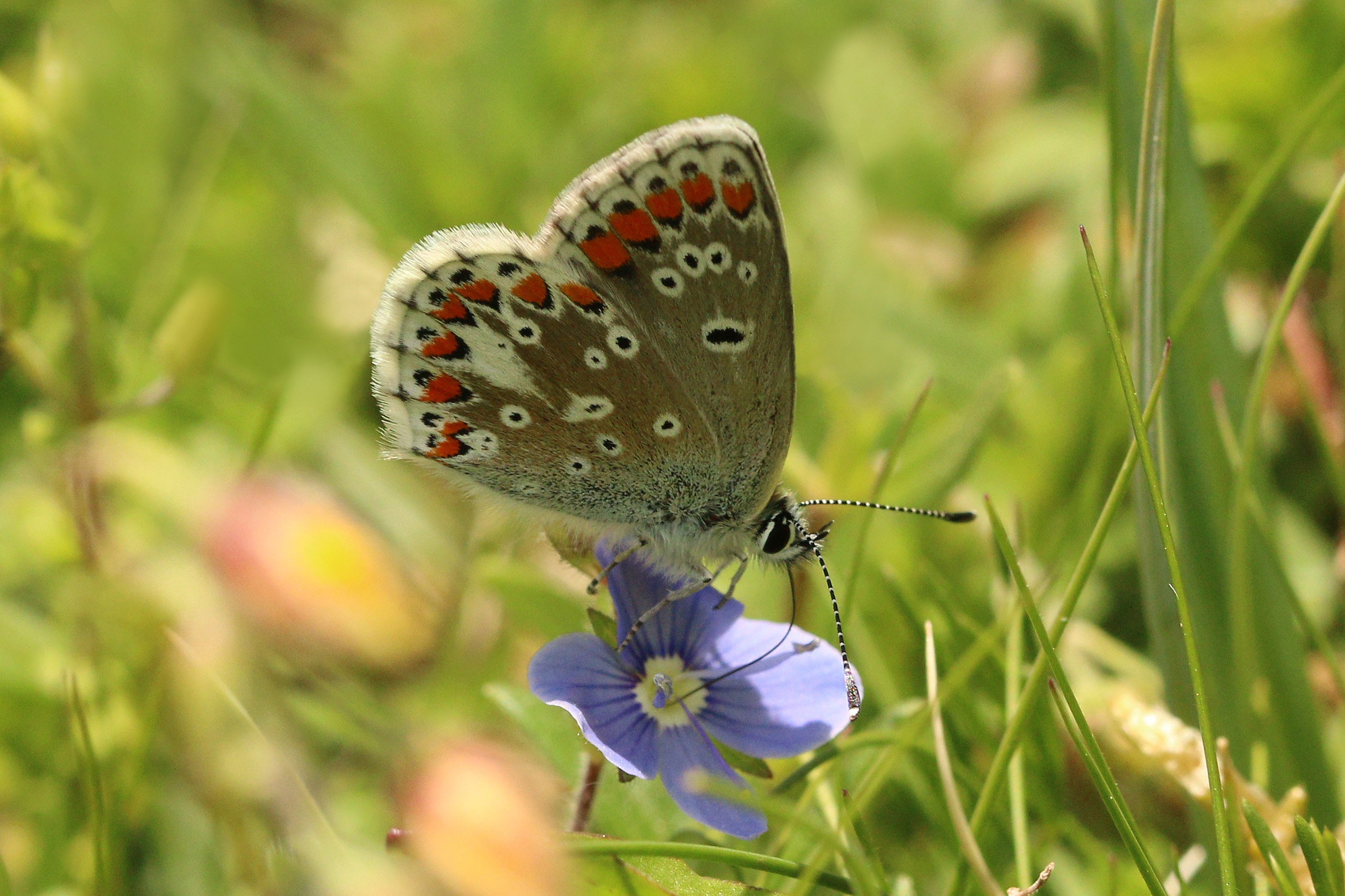
- Both males at Aston Rowant NNR, Oxfordshire

Scientific classification
- Kingdom: Animalia
- Phylum: Arthropoda
- Clade: Pancrustacea
- Class: Insecta
- Order: Lepidoptera
- Family: Lycaenidae
- Genus: Aricia
- Species: A. agestis

Binomial name
- Aricia agestis (Denis & Schiffermüller, 1775)

= Aricia agestis =

Brown argus

Species of butterfly

Aricia agestis

Aricia agestis, the brown argus, is a butterfly in the family Lycaenidae. It is found throughout the Palearctic realm, north to northern Jutland (Denmark), west as far as coastal Wales and east to Siberia and the Tian Shan.

It was described by Michael Denis and Ignaz Schiffermüller in 1775; the specific name agestis is thought to be a misspelling or typographic error for Latin agrestis, 'of the field.'

== Subspecies ==
- A. a. agestis southern and central Europe, Great Britain
- A. a. calida Chavignerie Sicily, Italy, Asia Minor
- A. a. azerbaidzhana Obraztsov, 1935 Transcaucasia, Caucaus Major
- A. a. nazira (Moore, 1865) Darvaz, western Pamirs, north-western Himalayas
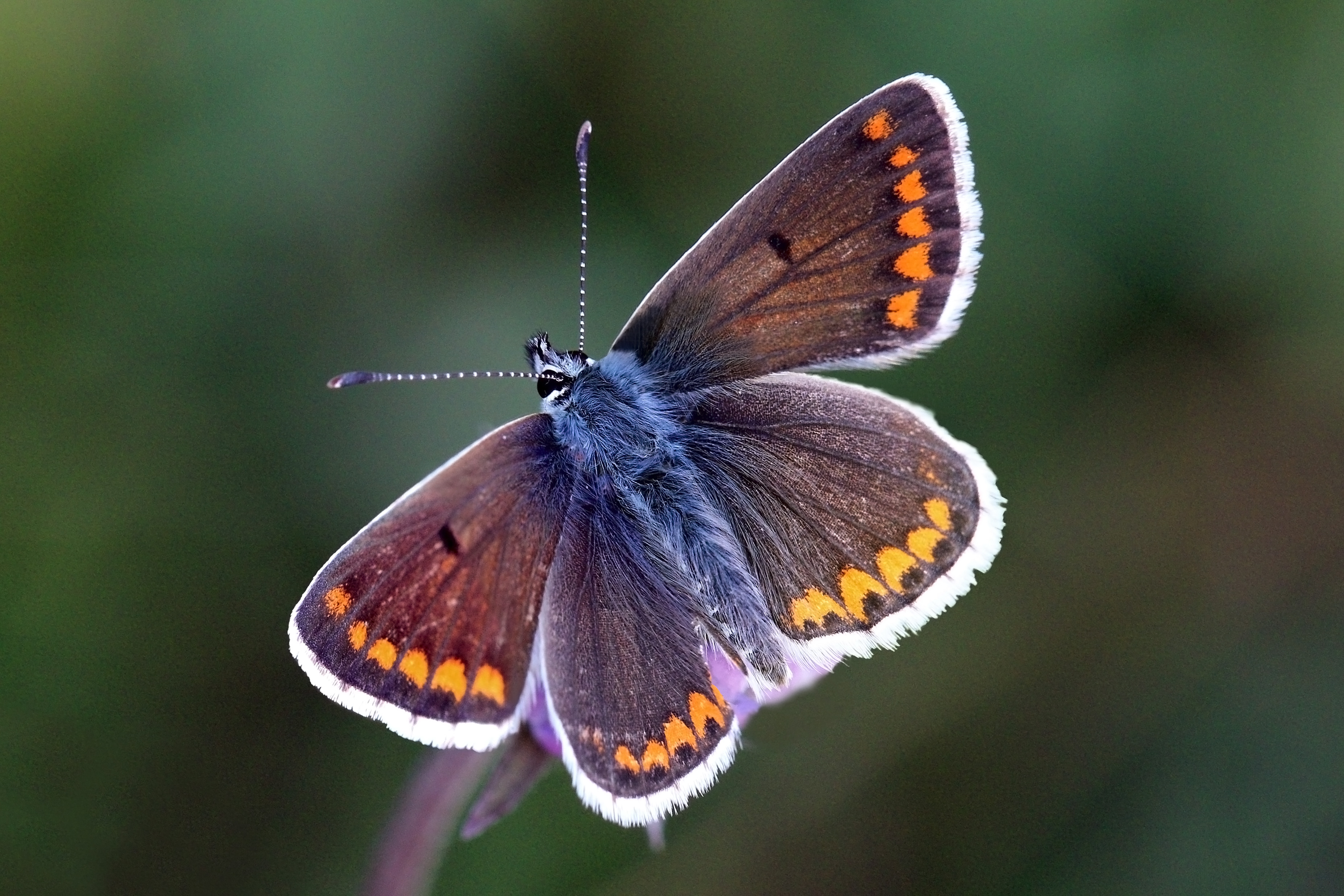
female A. a. agestis, UK

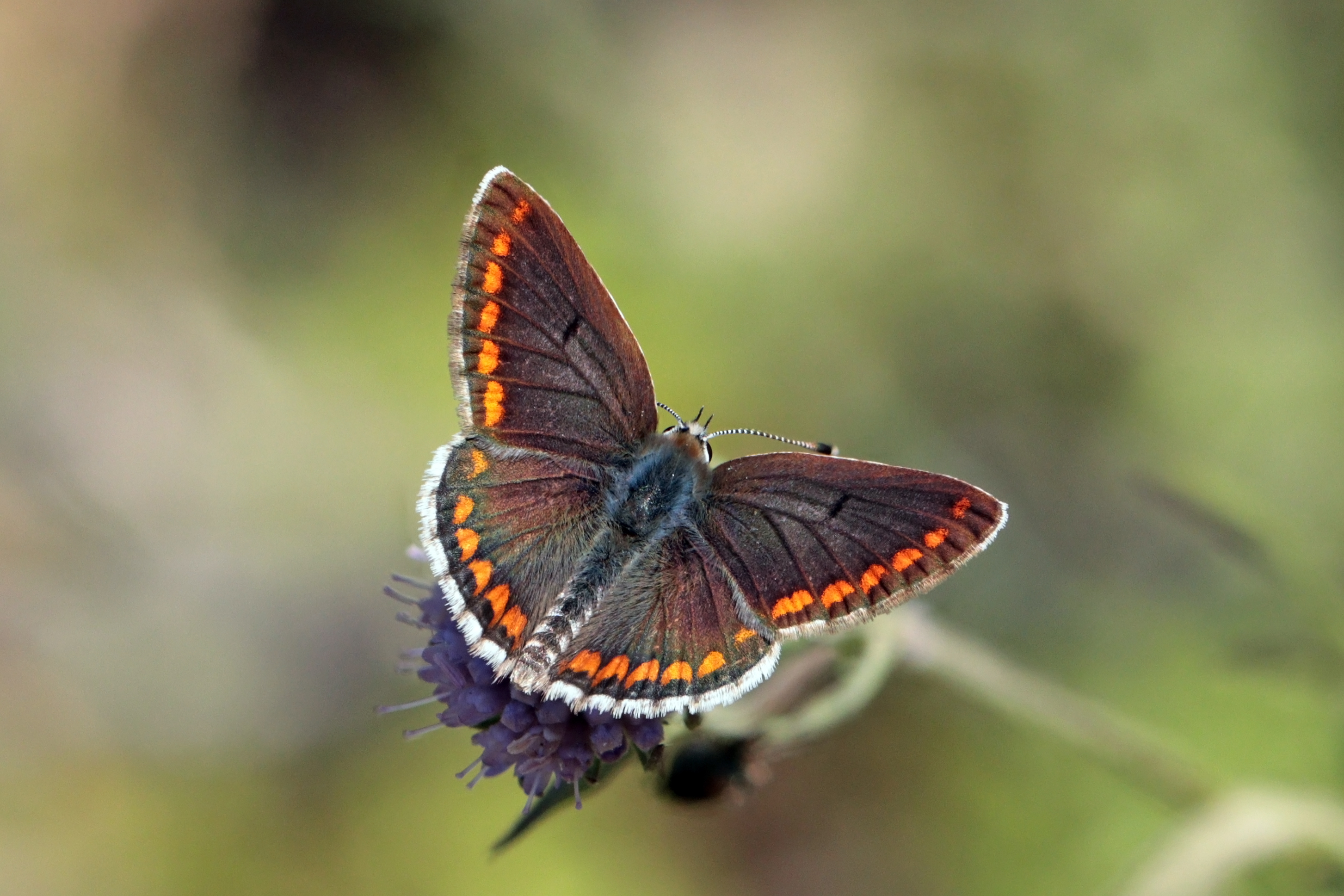
female A. a. calida, Italy

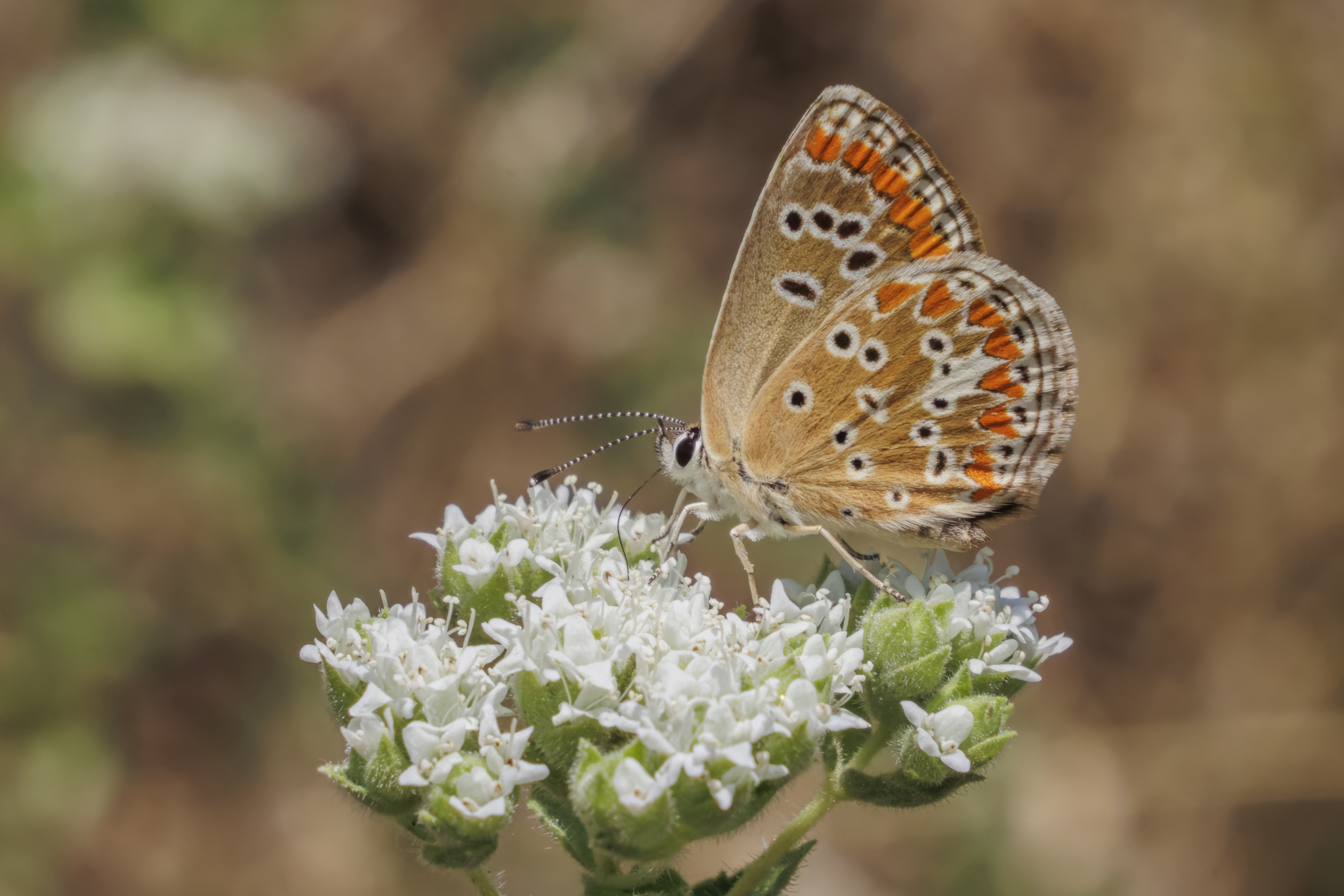
female A. a. calida, Turkey

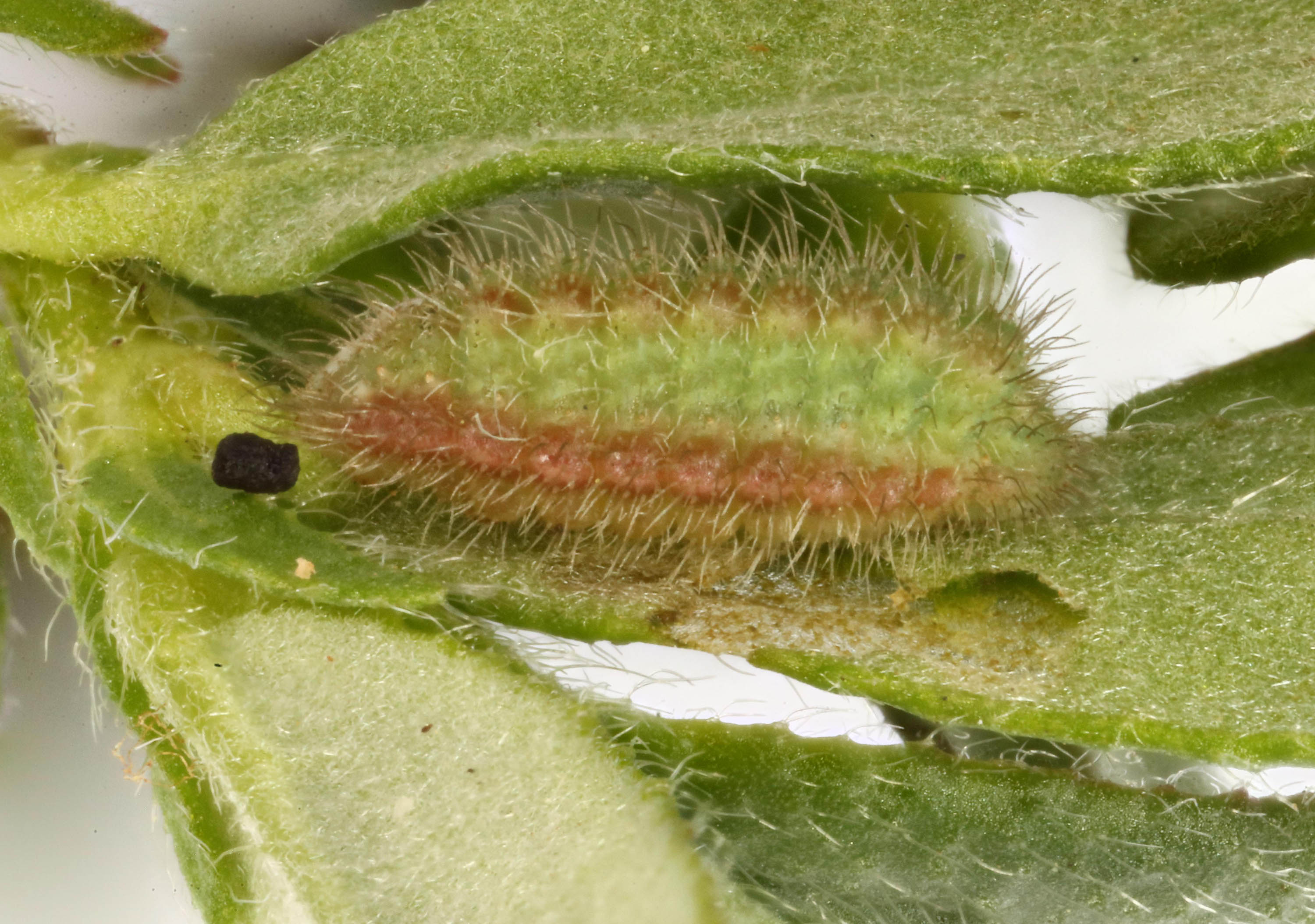
larva

== Description in Seitz ==
L. astrarche Bgstr. (= medon Hufn., agestis Schiff., idas Gerh. (?), nazira Moore) (79 k). Above similar to the preceding,[ L. anteros ] deep dark brown, with strongly marked discocellular spot, especially in the male. Typical specimens have this spot black and bear red spots at the outer margin. Underside with numerous ocelli, the hindwing with a pale smear from the apex of the cell to the centre of the outer margin. From Scandinavia to the Sahara and northern India, and from the Canary Isles to the island of Askold in the Pacific, ascending in the mountains up to 10,000 ft. (Doherty). — Besides accidental aberrations in the usual directions of variation, a number of seasonal and geographical forms have been established. If the spring-brood of the Central European form is regarded as name-typical astrarche, ab. aestiva Stgr. is the name for the second brood, which occurs regularly in the south and more rarely in the north and which connects astrarche with calida Bell. (79 k, 80 a) [A. a. calida (Bellier, 1862) . The latter has a much darker, almost coffee-brown, under-side, with a broader band of red spots. Egg pale green, flattened, with the top concave and the surface minutely reticulate (Tutt, Harrison, Gillmer). Larva light green, with a purple dorsal stripe and a similar stripe along the sides, between them oblique pale smears; in spring and summer (in the south throughout the year) on various plants, such as Helianthemum, Centaurea, Erodium, etc. Pupa pale yellowish green, sometimes with a brown dorsal stripe, on or near the ground. The butterflies are on the wing in May and again from July onward, in the south the whole summer until the autumn, in several broods. They fly everywhere, in fields, on field-paths, on rocky hills, even in gardens, always close to the ground and belong to the very commonest butterflies. During the hours of flight they settle with spread wings on blades of grass, blossoms, or clods of earth, while they sleep with closed wings generally hidden under umbels and the inflorescences of grasses.

== Appearance and biology (Great Britain) ==
Note that information on this species applies to Great Britain and some details may not be consistent with the species in other parts of its range.

Although one of the "blues", both sexes are brown on the uppersides with a band of orange spots at the border of each wing. They can be mistaken for other female blues but the brown argus never has any blue scales at the base of the wings like other female blues often do. It could also be mistaken for the northern brown argus (Aricia artaxerxes) were it not for the fact that their ranges do not overlap in the UK, unlike on continental Europe. The underside has the typical "blue" pattern of a greyish/brownish ground colour with black spots outlined in white and a row of orange spots along the border. The pattern of the black spots is the best way to distinguish this species from female common, chalkhill and Adonis blues as they lack the black spot found near the base of the forewing which is present on these three species. This species has seen an expansion in its range in recent years and is widely distributed across south-east England and most of the Midlands with colonies occurring in Wales and as far north as Yorkshire. These northern sites have seen a lot of confusion in recent years with genetic studies looking at various colonies to separate the two Aricia species. Until a few years ago, these northern colonies were thought to be the northern brown argus and more colonies may yet be found to be misidentified. Like other blues it is common on the chalk downlands of southern England but will also use other habitats such as woodland clearings, coastal grasslands and heathland. It is not closely related to the Scotch argus.

== Life cycle and food plants ==
Note that information on this species applies to Great Britain and some details may not be consistent with the species in other parts of its range.

Common rock-rose (Helianthemum nummularium) is the favoured food plant on calcareous soils. In other habitats dove's-foot cranesbill (Geranium molle) and common stork's-bill (Erodium cicutarium) are used and possibly other Geranium species as well. Eggs are laid singly on the underside of leaves. The typically slug-like lycid larvae are green with a pale line along each side and always attended by ants. They hibernate as fully-grown larvae and pupate the following spring. There are two broods a year in the southern colonies with adults on the wing in May and June and again in late July till mid-September but further north they are single brooded and fly in June and July.

Courtship ritual
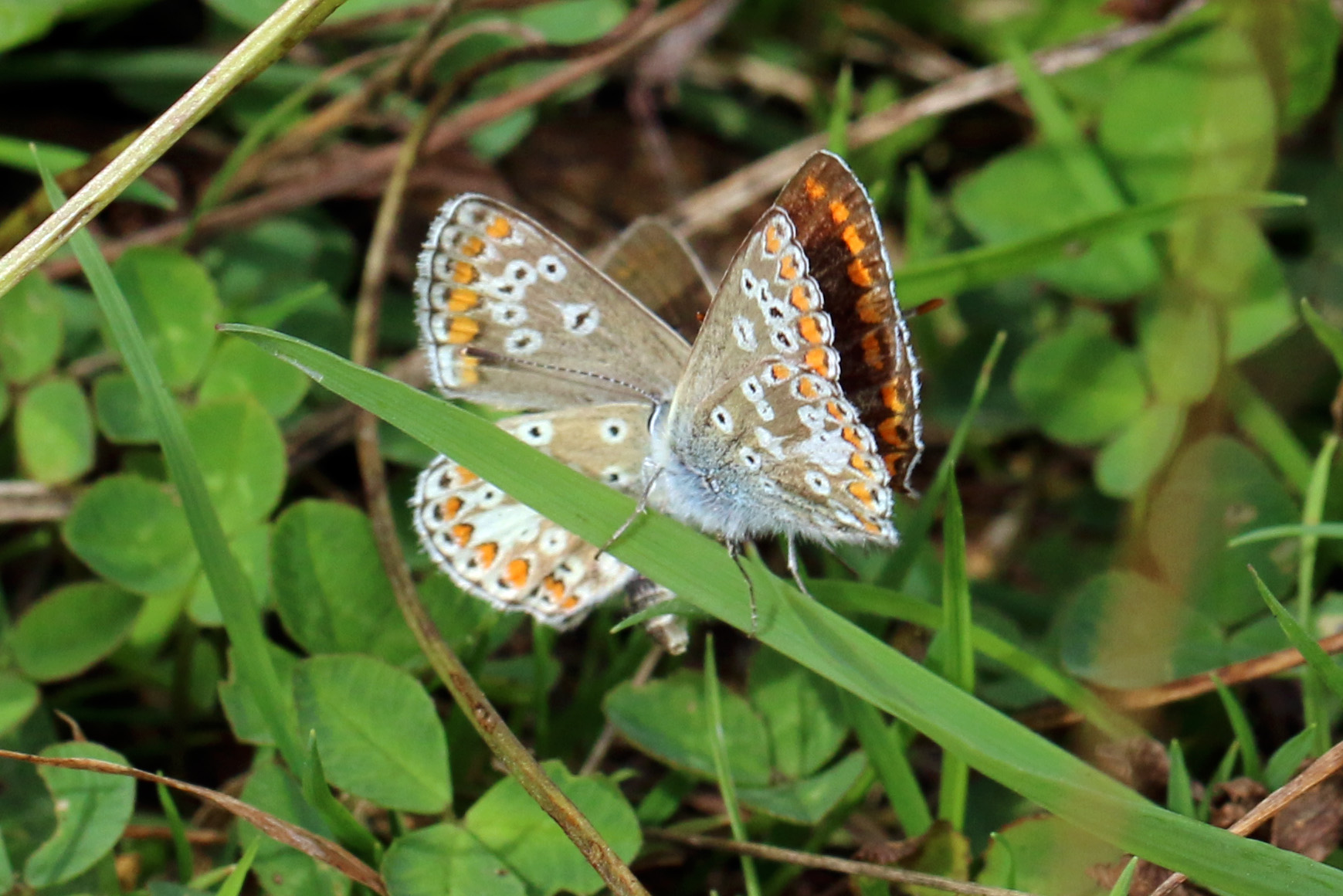
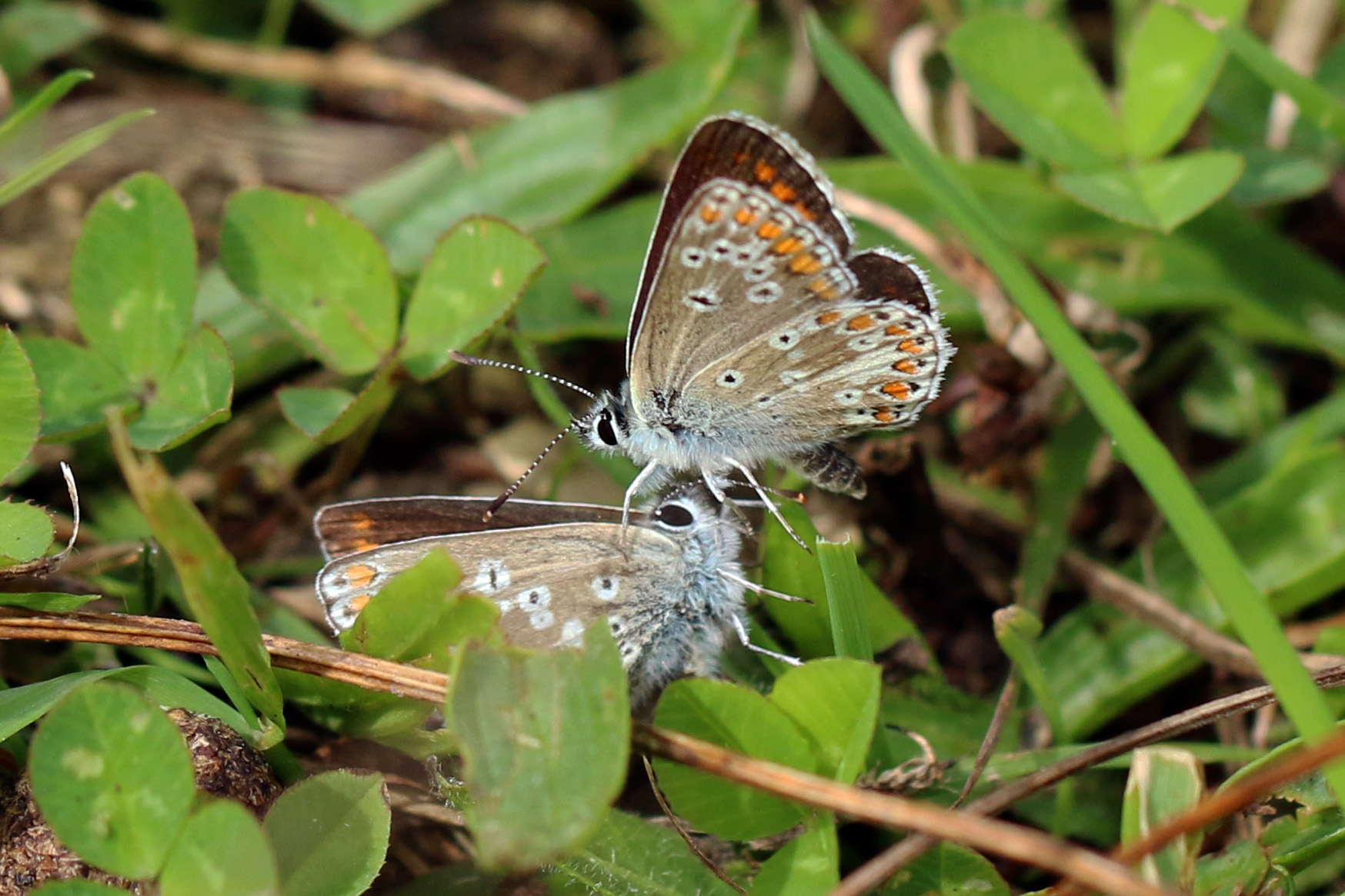
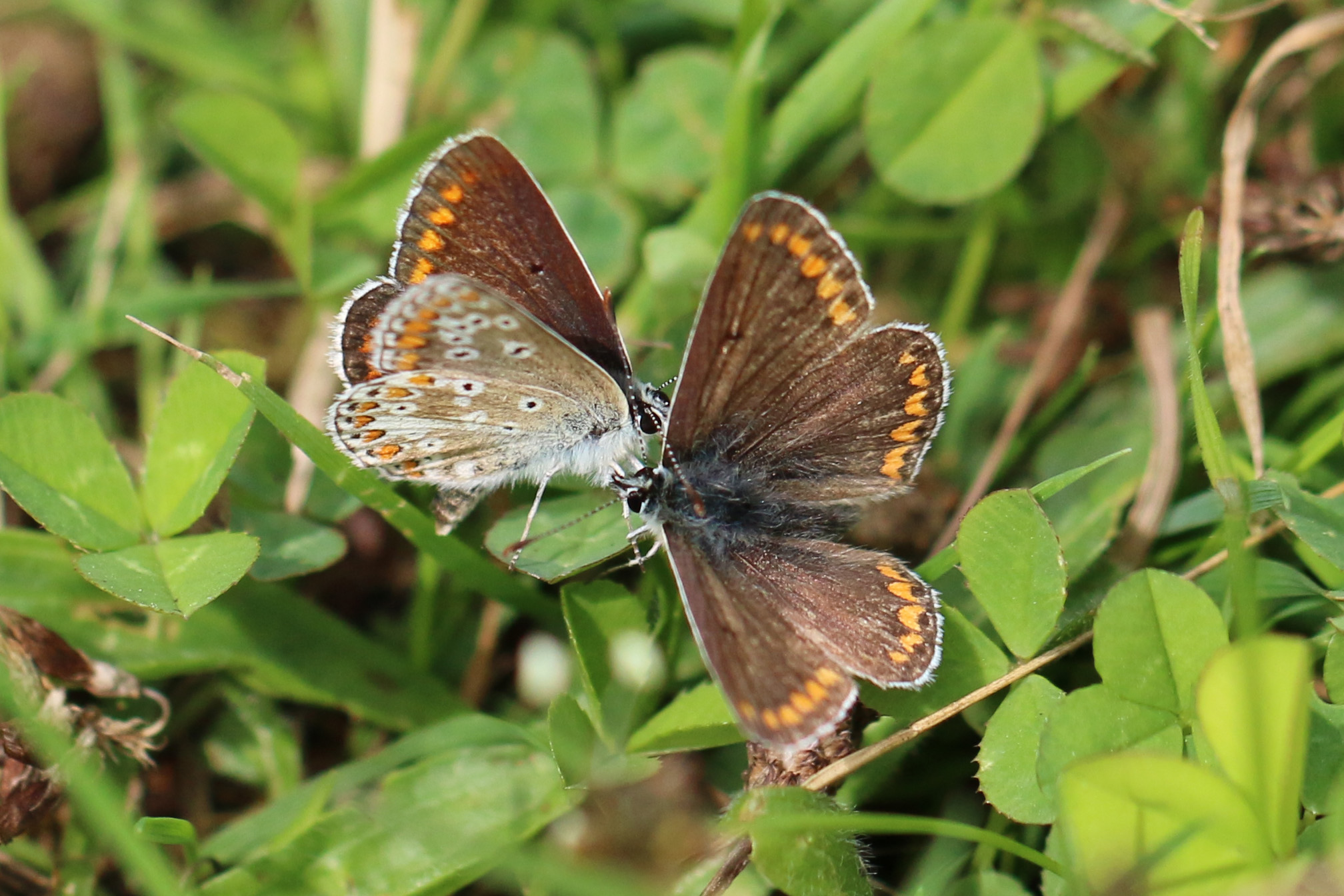
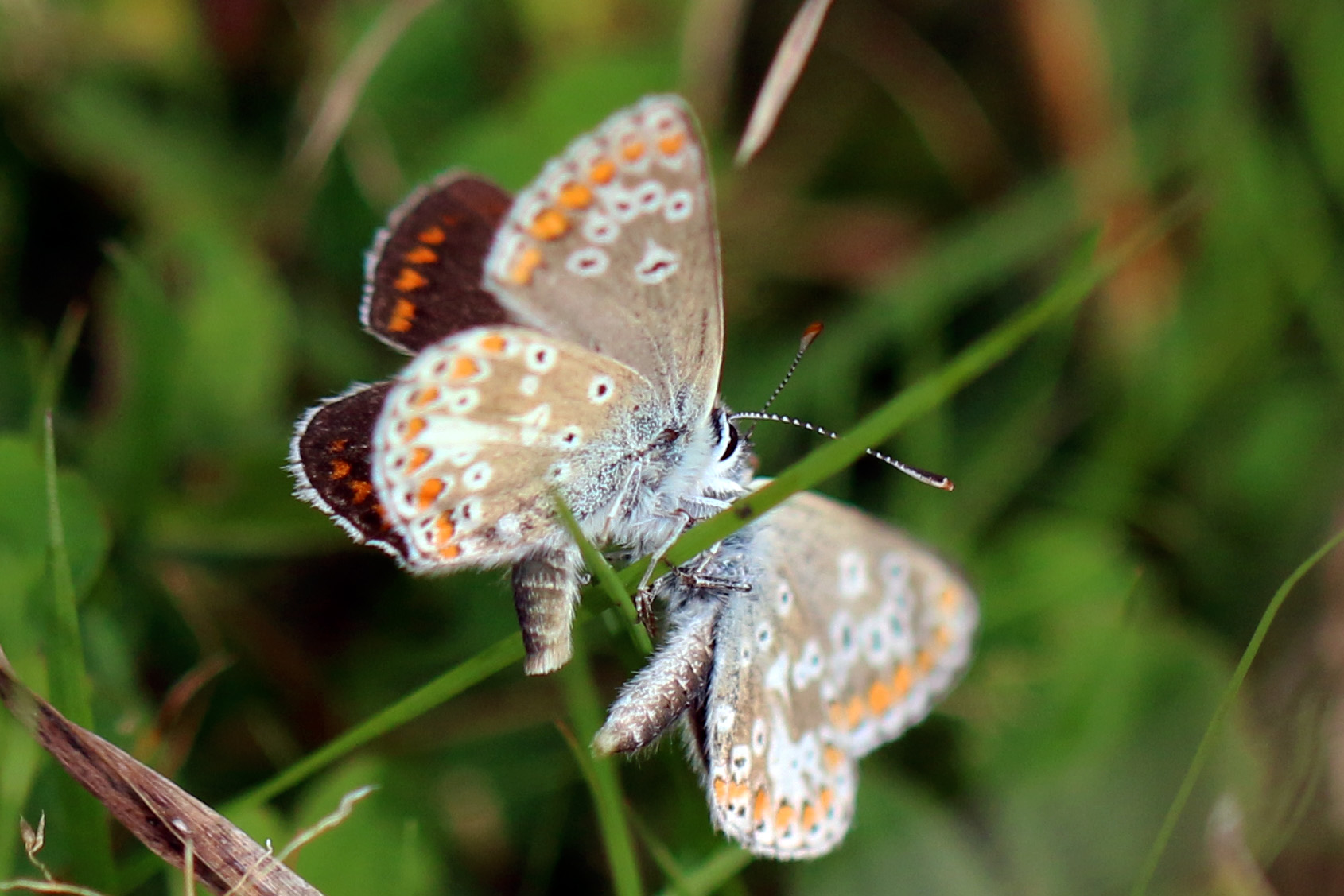
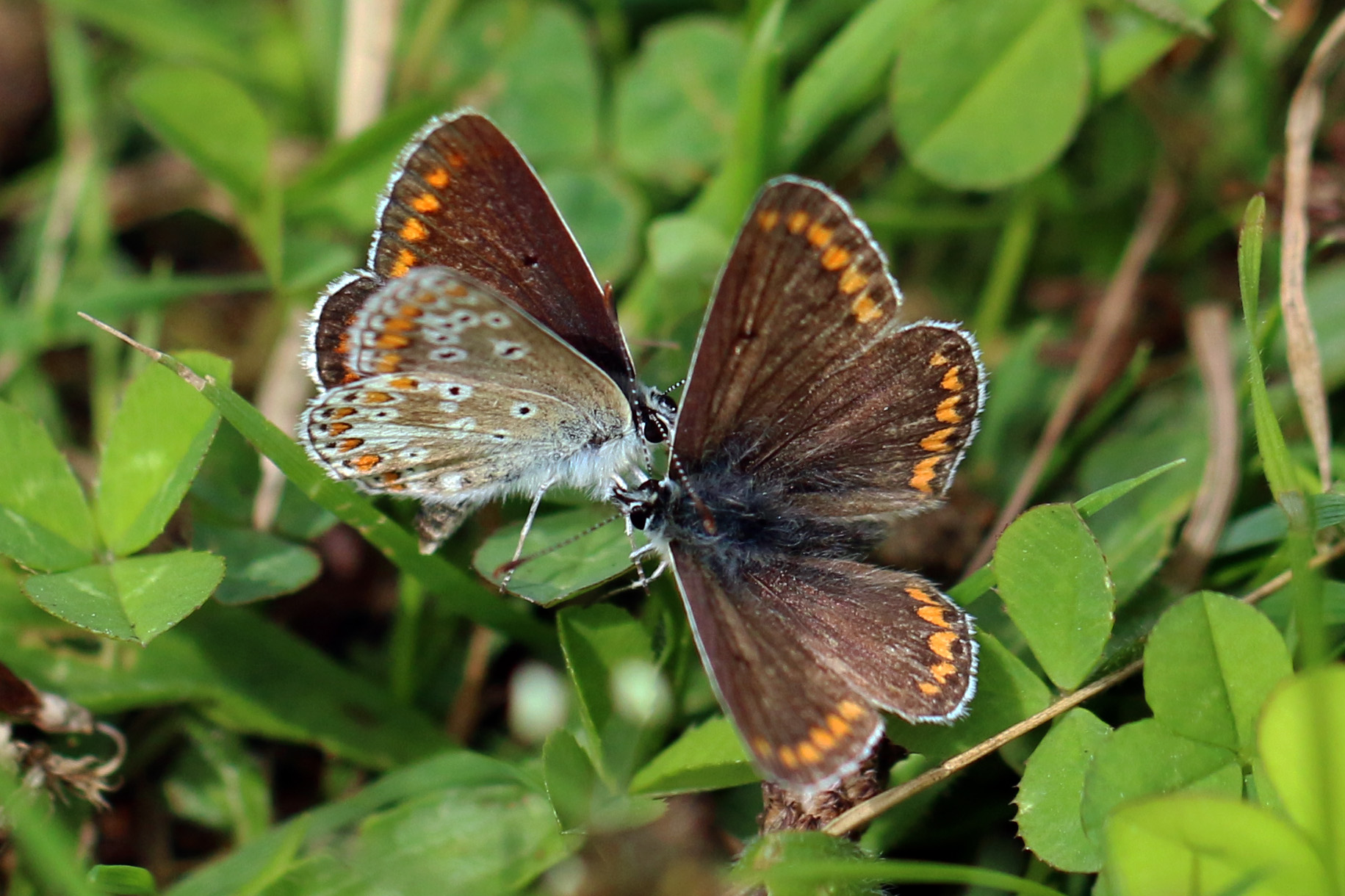

== See also ==
- List of butterflies of Great Britain
