= Eduard Pospichal =

Austrian botanist (1838–1905)

Eduard Ludvik Pospichal (13 June 1838 – 24 April 1905) was an Austrian botanist of Czech parentage born in Litomyšl in Bohemia (today in the Czech Republic).

Pospichal was a teacher at a secondary school in Trieste. He was the author of Flora des Oesterreichischen Küstenlandes (1897–99), a comprehensive treatise on flora found in regions on and around the northeast Adriatic coast. Also, he was also the author a study of plants found along the banks of the Cidlina and Mrdlina Rivers in Bohemia, titled Flora des Flussgebietes der Cidlina und Mrdlina (1881).
