= Rudolf von Uechtritz =

German botanist

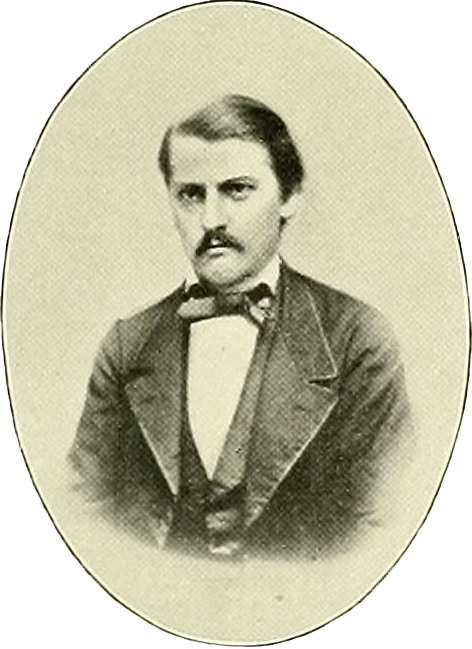
Rudolf von Uechtritz

Rudolf Karl Friedrich von Uechtritz (31 December 1838, Breslau – 21 November 1886, Breslau) was a German botanist. He was the son of Max von Uechtritz (1785–1851), a German rittmeister who conducted entomological and botanical studies (botanical abbreviation, "Uechtr.").

He studied natural sciences at the University of Breslau as a pupil of Heinrich Göppert and Ferdinand Cohn. In 1863 he terminated his studies at the university due to heart ailments and subsequently worked as a private scholar in Breslau.

He is largely known for his investigations of plants native to Silesia, although he also conducted botanical research in his excursions to southern Moravia (1855), the central Carpathians (1856), Tirol and the neighboring areas of Bavaria, Switzerland and northern Italy (1858) as well as to Thuringia, Franconia and Saxony (1860/61). He served as a custodian of the Schlesischen Gesellschaft für vaterländische Cultur, and was founder of the Schlesischen Botanischen Tauschvereins.

After his death, Adolf Engler purchased his herbarium and donated it to the University of Breslau. His library and manuscripts were also acquired by the university. The botanical genus Uechtritzia (Freyn, 1892) commemorates his name, as does taxa with the specific epithet of uechtritziana.

== Selected works ==
- Botanische Excursion in die Central-Karpathen, 1857.
- Bemerkungen über einige Pflanzen der ungarischen Flora, 1866.
- Zur Flora Ungarns, 1871.
- Resultate der Durchforschung der schlesischen Phanerogamenflora, 1874-84.
- Thlaspi banaticum, eine neue Species der ungarischen Flora, 1875.
- Flora von Schlesien preussischen und österreichischen Antheils (with Emil Fiek), 1881.
