= List of butterflies of Azerbaijan =

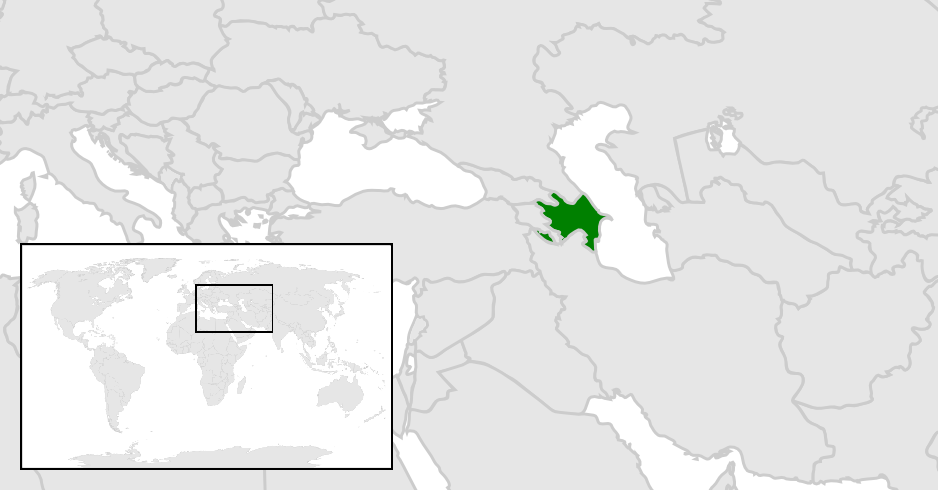
Location of Azerbaijan

This is a list of butterflies of Azerbaijan. About 230 species are known from Azerbaijan.

== Hesperiidae ==
=== Pyrginae ===
- Carcharodus alceae
- Carcharodus floccifera
- Carcharodus lavatherae
- Carcharodus orientalis
- Carcharodus stauderi
- Erynnis marloyi
- Erynnis tages unicolor
- Muschampia poggei
- Muschampia tersa
- Muschampia tessellum
- Pyrgus alveus
- Pyrgus armoricanus
- Pyrgus carthami
- Pyrgus cinarae
- Pyrgus cirsii
- Pyrgus jupei
- Pyrgus melotis
- Pyrgus serratulae major
- Pyrgus sidae
- Spialia orbifer
- Spialia phlomidis

=== Hesperiinae ===
- Eogenes alcides
- Gegenes nostrodamus
- Hesperia comma comma
- Ochlodes sylvanus
- Thymelicus acteon
- Thymelicus hyrax
- Thymelicus lineola
- Thymelicus sylvestris syriaca

== Papilionidae ==
=== Parnassiinae ===
- Parnassius mnemosyne nubilosus
- Parnassius apollo tkatshukovi

=== Papilioninae ===
- Iphiclides podalirius persica
- Papilio machaon syriacus
- Papilio alexanor orientalis

== Pieridae ==
=== Dismorphiinae ===
- Leptidea sinapis
- Leptidea juvernica
- Leptidea duponcheli maiae

=== Coliadinae ===
- Colias alfacariensis
- Colias chlorocoma
- Colias aurorina
- Colias thisoa
- Colias croceus
- Gonepteryx rhamni miljanowskii
- Gonepteryx farinosa turcirana

=== Pierinae ===
- Anthocharis cardamines
- Anthocharis carolinae
- Anthocharis damone eunomia
- Anthocharis gruneri armeniaca
- Aporia crataegi
- Euchloe ausonia taurica
- Pieris bowdeni
- Pieris brassicae
- Pieris caucasica
- Pieris ergane detersa
- Pieris krueperi krueperi
- Pieris napi pseudorapae
- Pieris napi suffusa
- Pieris rapae transcaucasica
- Pontia callidice chrysidice
- Pontia chloridice
- Pontia edusa edusa
- Zegris eupheme menestho

== Lycaenidae ==
=== Lycaeninae ===
- Lycaena phlaeas
- Lycaena virgaureae armeniaca
- Lycaena tityrus
- Lycaena alciphron melibeus
- Lycaena candens
- Lycaena thersamon
- Lycaena kurdistanica
- Lycaena ochimus
- Lycaena asabinus
- Lycaena thetis
- Lycaena phoenicurus

=== Polyommatinae ===
- Agriades pyrenaicus dardanus
- Aricia agestis azerbaidzhana
- Aricia anteros
- Aricia artaxerxes allous
- Aricia crassipuncta
- Aricia isaurica latimargo
- Celastrina argiolus
- Cupido argiades
- Cupido minimus
- Cupido osiris
- Cupido staudingeri
- Cyaniris bellis antiochena
- Eumedonia eumedon
- Freyeria trochylus
- Glaucopsyche alexis lugens
- Iolana iolas lessei
- Kretania alcedo
- Kretania eurypilus
- Kretania sephirus
- Kretania zephyrinus ordubadi
- Lampides boeticus
- Leptotes pirithous
- Lysandra bellargus
- Lysandra corydonius caucasica
- Neolysandra coelestina coelestina
- Neolysandra diana
- Phengaris arion zara
- Phengaris nausithous
- Phengaris rebeli monticola
- Plebejidea loewii
- Plebejus argus bellus
- Plebejus christophi transcaucasicus
- Plebejus idas altarmenus
- Polyommatus alcestis
- Polyommatus alticola
- Polyommatus altivagans
- Polyommatus amandus
- Polyommatus aserbeidschanus
- Polyommatus cyaneus
- Polyommatus damon
- Polyommatus damonides
- Polyommatus daphnis versicolor
- Polyommatus demavendi
- Polyommatus dorylas
- Polyommatus eriwanensis
- Polyommatus eros
- Polyommatus firdussi
- Polyommatus huberti
- Polyommatus icarus
- Polyommatus iphigenia
- Polyommatus myrrha
- Polyommatus neglectus
- Polyommatus ninae
- Polyommatus pseudorjabovi
- Polyommatus ripartii
- Polyommatus surakovi
- Polyommatus thersites
- Polyommatus turcicus
- Polyommatus vanensis
- Pseudophilotes vicrama schiffermuelleri
- Tarucus balkanicus
- Turanana endymion

=== Theclinae ===
- Callophrys armeniaca
- Callophrys chalybeitincta
- Callophrys danchenkoi
- Callophrys paulae
- Callophrys rubi
- Neozephyrus quercus
- Satyrium abdominalis
- Satyrium acaciae
- Satyrium hyrcanicum
- Satyrium ilicis
- Satyrium ledereri
- Satyrium spini melantho
- Satyrium w-album
- Tomares callimachus
- Tomares romanovi

== Nymphalidae ==
=== Libytheinae ===
- Libythea celtis

=== Heliconiinae ===
- Argynnis paphia
- Argynnis pandora
- Brenthis hecate
- Brenthis daphne
- Brenthis ino
- Boloria euphrosyne dagestanica
- Boloria dia
- Boloria caucasica
- Fabriciana adippe taurica
- Fabriciana niobe gigantea
- Issoria lathonia
- Speyeria aglaja ottomana

=== Nymphalinae ===
- Aglais io
- Aglais urticae turcica
- Euphydryas aurinia
- Melitaea arduinna kocaki
- Melitaea athalia athalia
- Melitaea aurelia
- Melitaea caucasogenita
- Melitaea cinxia
- Melitaea diamina
- Melitaea didyma
- Melitaea interrupta
- Melitaea persea
- Melitaea phoebe ottonis
- Melitaea telona
- Melitaea trivia caucasi
- Melitaea turkmenica
- Nymphalis antiopa
- Nymphalis polychloros
- Nymphalis xanthomelas
- Polygonia c-album
- Polygonia egea
- Vanessa atalanta
- Vanessa cardui

=== Limenitinae ===
- Limenitis camilla
- Limenitis reducta reducta
- Neptis rivularis ludmilla

=== Apaturinae ===
- Thaleropis ionia

=== Satyrinae ===
- Arethusana arethusa
- Brintesia circe venusta
- Chazara bischoffii
- Chazara briseis armena
- Chazara persephone
- Coenonympha arcania
- Coenonympha glycerion alta
- Coenonympha leander obscura
- Coenonympha lyllus
- Coenonympha pamphilus marginata
- Coenonympha saadi
- Coenonympha symphita
- Erebia aethiops melusina
- Erebia graucasica
- Erebia medusa psodea
- Esperarge climene
- Hipparchia fatua
- Hipparchia parisatis
- Hipparchia pellucida
- Hipparchia statilinus
- Hipparchia syriaca
- Hyponephele lupinus
- Hyponephele lycaon
- Hyponephele lycaonoides
- Hyponephele naricoides
- Lasiommata maera orientalis
- Lasiommata megera megerina
- Maniola jurtina strandiana
- Melanargia galathea satnia
- Melanargia larissa astanda
- Melanargia russiae
- Minois dryas
- Pararge aegeria tircis
- Proterebia afra hyrcana
- Pseudochazara beroe rhena
- Pseudochazara daghestana
- Pseudochazara geyeri
- Pseudochazara pelopea
- Pseudochazara schahrudensis
- Pseudochazara thelephassa
- Satyrus amasinus
- Satyrus effendi
