= List of butterflies of Europe (Nymphalidae) =

This is a list of the butterflies of family Nymphalidae, or the "browns", which are found in Europe. It is a part of the List of the butterflies of Europe

== Subfamily Nymphalinae ==
Tribe Junoniini

- Diadem, Hypolimnas misippus (Linnaeus, 1764) Canary Islands, Madeira

Tribe Nymphalini

- European peacock, Aglais io (Linnaeus 1758)
- Small tortoiseshell, Aglais urticae (Linnaeus 1758)
- Sardinian small tortoiseshell, Aglais ichnusa (Bonelli, 1826)
- Map butterfly, Araschnia levana (Linnaeus 1758)
- White petticoat, Nymphalis antiopa (Linnaeus 1758)
- Large tortoiseshell, Nymphalis polychloros (Linnaeus 1758)
- Yellow-legged tortoiseshell, Nymphalis xanthomelas (Denis & Schiffermüller, 1775)
- False comma, Nymphalis vaualbum ([Denis & Schiffermüller], 1775)
- Comma, Polygonia c-album (Linnaeus 1758)
- Southern comma, Polygonia egea (Cramer 1775)
- Red admiral, Vanessa atalanta (Linnaeus 1758)
- Canary red admiral, Vanessa vulcania Godart, 1819
- Painted lady, Vanessa cardui (Linnaeus 1758)
- American painted lady, Vanessa virginiensis (Drury, 1773)

Tribe Melitaeini

- Scarce fritillary, Euphydryas maturna (Linnaeus 1758)
- Asian fritillary, Euphydryas intermedia (Ménétriés, 1859)
- Euphydryas italica Back, Haussmann, Salk & Weiss, 2015
- Cynthia's fritillary, Euphydryas cynthia (Denis & Schiffermüller 1775)
- Lapland fritillary, Euphydryas iduna (Dalman, 1816)
- Marsh fritillary, Euphydryas aurinia (Rottemburg, 1775)
- Spanish marsh fritillary, Euphydryas beckeri (Lederer, 1853)
- Spanish fritillary, Euphydryas desfontainii (Godart, 1819)
- Euphydryas orientalis (Herrich-Schäffer, 1851)
- Spotted fritillary, Melitaea didyma (Esper, 1778)
- Freyer's fritillary, Melitaea arduinna (Esper, [1783])
- Lesser spotted fritillary, Melitaea trivia (Denis & Schiffermüller, 1775)
- Aetherie fritillary, Melitaea aetherie (Hübner 1826)
- Knapweed fritillary, Melitaea phoebe (Denis & Schiffermüller, 1775)
- Jerusalem fritillary, Melitaea telona (Fruhstorfer, 1908)
- Little fritillary, Melitaea asteria (Freyer, 1828)
- Heath fritillary, Melitaea athalia (Rottemburg, 1775)
- Nickerl's fritillary, Melitaea aurelia Nickerl, 1850
- Assman's fritillary, Melitaea britomartis (Assmann, 1847)
- Provençal fritillary, Melitaea deione (Geyer, 1832)
- Melitaea nevadensis Oberthür, 1904
- Glanville fritillary, Melitaea cinxia (Linnaeus, 1758)
- False heath fritillary, Melitaea diamina (Lang, 1789)
- Meadow fritillary, Melitaea parthenoides Keferstein, 1851
- Grisons fritillary, Melitaea varia Meyer-Dur, 1851
- Sicilian fritillary, Melitaea ornata Christoph, 1893

== Subfamily Heliconiinae ==
- Silver-washed fritillary, Argynnis paphia (Linnaeus, 1758)
- Pallas' fritillary, Argynnis laodice (Pallas, 1771)
- Cardinal, Argynnis pandora (Denis & Schiffermüller 1775)
- Mountain fritillary, Boloria alaskensis (Holland, 1900) North Russia
- Cranberry fritillary, Boloria aquilonaris Stichel, 1908
- Balkan fritillary, Boloria graeca (Staudinger, 1870)
- Mountain fritillary, Boloria napaea (Hoffmannsegg, 1804)
- Shepherd's fritillary, Boloria pales (Denis & Schiffermüller, 1775)
- Erschoff's fritillary, Boloria angarensis (Erschoff, 1870) North and East Russia
- Arctic fritillary, Boloria chariclea Schneider, 1794
- Violet fritillary, Boloria dia (Linnaeus, 1767)
- Pearl-bordered fritillary, Boloria euphrosyne (Linnaeus, 1758)
- Freija fritillary, Boloria freija (Becklin in Thunberg, 1791)
- Frigga fritillary, Boloria frigga Becklin in Thunberg, 1791
- Dingy fritillary, Boloria improba Butler, 1877
- Boloria oscarus (Eversmann, 1844) Russia (Urals)
- Polaris fritillary, Boloria polaris Boisduval, 1828
- Small pearl-bordered fritillary, Boloria selene (Denis & Schiffermüller, 1775)
- Boloria selenis (Eversmann, 1837) Russia
- Thor's fritillary, Boloria thore (Hübner, 1803)
- Purple bog fritillary, Boloria titania (Esper, 1793)
- Boloria tritonia (Böber, 1812) North Russia
- Ocellate bog fritillary, Boloria eunomia (Esper, 1799)
- Marbled fritillary, Brenthis daphne (Bergstrasser, 1780)
- Twin-spot fritillary, Brenthis hecate (Denis & Schiffermüller, 1775)
- Lesser marbled fritillary, Brenthis ino (Rottemburg, 1775)
- High brown fritillary, Fabriciana adippe (Denis & Schiffermüller 1775)
- Corsican fritillary, Fabriciana elisa (Godart, [1824])
- Niobe fritillary, Fabriciana niobe (Linnaeus, 1758)
- Queen of Spain, Issoria lathonia (Linnaeus, 1758)
- Issoria eugenia (Eversmann, 1847) North European Russia
- Dark green fritillary, Speyeria aglaja (Linnaeus, 1758)

== Subfamily Charaxinae ==
- Two-tailed pasha, Charaxes jasius (Linnaeus, 1767)

== Subfamily Danainae ==
- Plain tiger, Danaus chrysippus (Linnaeus, 1758)
- Monarch, Danaus plexippus (Linnaeus, 1758)

== Subfamily Apaturinae ==
- Lesser purple emperor, Apatura ilia (Denis & Schiffermüller 1775)
- Purple emperor, Apatura iris (Linnaeus, 1758)
- Freyer's purple emperor, Apatura metis Freyer, 1829

== Subfamily Libytheinae ==
- Nettle-tree butterfly, Libythea celtis (Laicharting, 1782)

== Subfamily Limenitidinae ==
- White admiral, Limenitis camilla (Linnaeus, 1764)
- Poplar admiral, Limenitis populi (Linnaeus, 1758)
- Southern white admiral, Limenitis reducta Staudinger, 1901
- Hungarian glider, Neptis rivularis (Scopoli 1763)
- Pallas' sailer, Neptis sappho (Pallas 1771)

== Subfamily Satyrinae ==
- Speckled wood, Pararge aegeria (Linnaeus, 1758)
- Madeiran speckled wood, Pararge xiphia (Fabricius, 1775)
- Canary speckled wood, Pararge xiphioides Staudinger, 1871
- Wall, Lasiommata megera (Linnaeus, 1767)
- Large wall, Lasiommata maera (Linnaeus, 1758)
- Northern wall brown, Lasiommata petropolitana (Fabricius, 1787)
- Corsican wall brown, Lasiommata paramegaera (Hübner, 1824)
- Woodland brown, Lopinga achine (Scopoli, 1763)
- Lopinga deidamia (Eversmann, 1851)
- Iranian argus, Kirinia climene (Esper, [1783])
- Lattice brown, Kirinia roxelana (Cramer, 1777)
- Stoll's heath, Coenonympha amaryllis (Stoll, 1782) South European Russia
- Large heath, Coenonympha tullia (Muller, 1764)
- False ringlet, Coenonympha oedippus (Fabricius, 1787)
- Pearly heath, Coenonympha arcania (Linnaeus, 1761)
- Corsican heath, Coenonympha corinna (Hübner, 1804)
- Dusky heath, Coenonympha dorus (Esper, 1782)
- Alpine heath, Coenonympha gardetta (de Prunner, 1798)
- Chestnut heath, Coenonympha glycerion (Borkhausen, 1788)
- Scarce heath, Coenonympha hero Linnaeus, 1761
- Russian heath, Coenonympha leander (Esper, 1784)
- Small heath, Coenonympha pamphilus (Linnaeus, 1758)
- Eastern large heath, Coenonympha rhodopensis Elwes, 1900
- Cretan small heath, Coenonympha thyrsis Freyer, 1845
- Balkan heath, Coenonympha orientalis (Rebel, 1910)
- Siberian heath, Coenonympha phryne (Pallas, 1771) Central and South European Russia
- False Mnestra ringlet, Erebia aethiopellus (Hoffmannsegg, 1806)
- Scotch argus, Erebia aethiops (Esper, 1777)
- Almond-eyed ringlet, Erebia alberganus (de Prunner, 1798)
- Erebia bubastis (Meisner, 1818)
- Lorkovic's brassy ringlet, Erebia calcaria Lorkovic, 1953
- Common brassy ringlet, Erebia cassioides cassioides (Reiner & Hochenwarth, 1792)
- Raetzer's ringlet, Erebia christi Ratzer, 1890
- White speck ringlet, Erebia claudina (Borkhausen, 1789) Austria
- Erebia cyclopius (Eversmann, 1844) North and East European Russia
- Erebia dabanensis Erschoff, 1871 North European Russia
- Arctic ringlet, Erebia disa (Thunberg, 1791)
- Red-disked alpine, Erebia discoidalis (Kirby, 1837) North European Russia
- Erebia edda Ménétriés, 1851 North European Russia
- Lapland ringlet, Erebia embla (Becklin, 1791)
- Small mountain ringlet, Erebia epiphron (Knoch, 1783)
- Spring ringlet, Erebia epistygne (Hübner, 1824)
- Eriphyle ringlet, Erebia eriphyle (Freyer, 1836)
- Large ringlet, Erebia euryale (Esper, 1805)
- Banded alpine, Erebia fasciata Butler, 1868
- Yellow-banded ringlet, Erebia flavofasciata Heyne, 1895
- Silky ringlet, Erebia gorge (Hübner 1804)
- Lefèbvre's ringlet, Erebia lefebvrei (Boisduval, [1828])
- Arran brown, Erebia ligea (Linnaeus, 1758)
- Yellow-spotted ringlet, Erebia manto (Denis & Schiffermüller, 1775)
- Woodland ringlet, Erebia medusa (Denis & Schiffermüller, 1775)
- Lesser mountain ringlet, Erebia melampus (Fuessly 1775)
- Black ringlet, Erebia melas (Herbst 1796)
- Piedmont ringlet, Erebia meolans (Prunner, 1798)
- Mnestra's ringlet, Erebia mnestra (Hübner 1804)
- Marbled ringlet, Erebia montanus (de Prunner, 1798)
- Autumn ringlet, Erebia neoridas (Boisduval, 1828)
- de Lesse's brassy ringlet, Erebia nivalis Lorkovic & De Lesse, 1954
- Bright eyed ringlet, Erebia oeme (Hübner, 1804)
- Ottoman brassy ringlet, Erebia ottomana Herrich-Schäffer, 1847
- Dewy ringlet, Erebia pandrose (Borkhausen, 1788)
- Blind ringlet, Erebia pharte (Hübner, 1804)
- Sooty ringlet, Erebia pluto (de Prunner, 1798)
- Water ringlet, Erebia pronoe (Esper, 1780)
- Larche ringlet, Erebia scipio Boisduval, 1832
- False dewy ringlet, Erebia sthennyo Graslin, 1850
- Styrian ringlet, Erebia stirius (Godart, 1824)
- Stygian ringlet, Erebia styx (Freyer, 1834)
- Sudeten ringlet, Erebia sudetica, Staudinger, 1861
- de Prunner's ringlet, Erebia triarius (de Prunner, 1798)
- Swiss brassy ringlet, Erebia tyndarus (Esper, 1781)
- Erebia vogesiaca Christ, 1881 [1882?]
- Dalmatian ringlet, Proterebia afra (Fabricius, 1787) European Russia, Croatia, Greece
- Ringlet, Aphantopus hyperantus (Linnaeus, 1758)
- Southern gatekeeper, Pyronia cecilia (Vallantin, 1894)
- Gatekeeper, Pyronia tithonus (Linnaeus, 1767)
- Spanish gatekeeper, Pyronia bathseba (Fabricius, 1793)
- Oriental meadow brown, Hyponephele lupinus (O. Costa 1836)
- Dusky meadow brown, Hyponephele lycaon (Rottemburg 1775)
- Koçak's meadow brown, Hyponephele huebneri Koçak, 1980 South European Russia
- Aegean meadow brown, Maniola chia Thomson, 1987
- Meadow brown, Maniola jurtina (Linnaeus 1758)
- Halicarnas brown, Maniola halicarnassus Thomson, 1990 Nisyros Island, Greece
- Cyprus meadow brown, Maniola cypricola Thomson, 1990 Cyprus
- Turkish meadow brown, Maniola megala (Oberthür, 1909) Greece
- Sardinian meadow brown, Maniola nurag Ghiliani, 1852 Sardinia
- Dodecanese meadow brown, Maniola telmessia (Zeller, 1847) Dodecanese and North Aegean
- Marbled white, Melanargia galathea (Linnaeus, 1758)
- Western marbled white, Melanargia occitanica (Esper, 1793)
- Esper's marbled white, Melanargia russiae (Esper, 1783)
- Italian marbled white, Melanargia arge (Sulzer, 1776)
- Spanish marbled white, Melanargia ines (Hoffmannsegg, 1804)
- Iberian marbled white, Melanargia lachesis (Hübner, 1790)
- Balkan marbled white, Melanargia larissa (Geyer, 1828)
- Sicilian marbled white, Melanargia pherusa (Boisduval, 1833) Sicily
- Black satyr, Satyrus actaea (Esper, 1781)
- Great sooty satyr, Satyrus ferula (Fabricius, 1793)
- Russian grayling, Hipparchia autonoe (Esper, 1784)
- Woodland grayling, Hipparchia fagi (Scopoli 1763)
- Rock grayling, Hipparchia hermione (Linnaeus, 1764)
- Hipparchia neomiris (Godart, 1822)
- Eastern rock grayling, Hipparchia syriaca (Staudinger, 1871)
- Freyer's grayling, Hipparchia fatua Freyer, 1844
- Tree grayling, Hipparchia statilinus (Hufnagel, 1766)
- Southern grayling, Hipparchia aristaeus (Bonelli, 1826)
- Azores grayling, Hipparchia azorina (Strecker, 1899)
- Sicilian grayling, Hipparchia blachieri (Frühstorfer, 1908)
- Karpathos grayling, Hipparchia christenseni Kudrna, 1977 Karpathos, Greece
- Cretan grayling, Hipparchia cretica (Rebel, 1916) Crete
- Cyprus grayling, Hipparchia cypriensis (Holik, 1949) Cyprus
- Eolian grayling, Hipparchia leighebi Kudrna, 1976 Eolian Islands of Italy (Volcano and Panarea)
- Madeiran grayling, Hipparchia maderensis (Bethune-Baker, 1891)
- Samos grayling, Hipparchia mersina (Staudinger, 1871) Lesbos and Samos, Greece
- Le Cerf's grayling, Hipparchia miguelensis (Le Cerf, 1935) Sao Miguel, Azores
- Hipparchia neapolitana (Stauder, 1921)
- Anatolian grayling, Hipparchia pellucida (Stauder, 1924) Vóreion Aiyáion, North Aegean
- Hipparchia sbordonii Kudrna, 1984
- Grayling, Hipparchia semele (Linnaeus, 1758)
- Balkan grayling, Hipparchia senthes (Fruhstorfer, 1908) Balkans
- Delattin's grayling, Hipparchia volgensis (Mazochin-Porshnjakov, 1952) Southeast Europe
- El Hierro grayling, Hipparchia bacchus Higgins, 1967 Canary Islands
- Striped grayling, Hipparchia fidia (Linnaeus, 1767)
- Gomera grayling, Hipparchia gomera Higgins, 1967 Canary Islands
- Gran Canaria grayling, Hipparchia tamadabae Owen & Smith, 1992 Canary Islands
- La Palma grayling, Hipparchia tilosi (Manil, 1984) Canary Islands
- Canary grayling, Hipparchia wyssii (Christ, 1889) Canary Islands
- Dryad, Minois dryas (Scopoli, 1763)
- False grayling, Arethusana arethusa (Denis & Schiffermüller, 1775)
- Great banded grayling, Brintesia circe (Fabricius, 1775)
- Arctic grayling, Oeneis bore (Schneider, 1792)
- Alpine grayling, Oeneis glacialis (Moll, 1783)
- Baltic grayling, Oeneis jutta (Hübner, [1806-1806])
- Melissa Arctic, Oeneis melissa (Fabricius, 1775) North European Russia
- Graeser's grayling, Oeneis magna Graeser, 1888 North European Russia
- Norse grayling, Oeneis norna (Thunberg, 1791) North European Russia, Scandinavia
- Norique Alpin, Oeneis polixenes (Fabricius, 1775) North European Russia
- Oeneis tarpeia (Pallas, 1771) Central and South European Russia
- Hermit, Chazara briseis (Linnaeus 1764)
- Dark rockbrown, Chazara persephone (Hübner, [1805])
- Southern hermit, Chazara prieuri (Pierret, 1837)
- Brown's grayling Pseudochazara amymone Brown, 1976
- Pseudochazara anthelea (Hübner, 1824)
- Pseudochazara beroe (Herrich-Schäffer, 1844)
- Macedonian grayling, Pseudochazara cingovskii Gross, 1973
- Crimean grayling, Pseudochazara euxina (Kuznetzov, 1909)
- Grey Asian grayling, Pseudochazara geyeri (Herrich-Schäffer, 1846)
- Pseudochazara graeca (Staudinger, 1870)
- Pseudochazara hippolyte (Esper, 1783)
- Tawny rockbrown, Pseudochazara mniszechii (Herrich-Schäffer, 1851)
- Dils' grayling, Pseudochazara orestes De Prins & van der Poorten, 1981
- Nevada grayling, Pseudochazara williamsi (Romei, 1927)
- Satyrus virbius (Herrich-Schäffer, 1844) South European Russia
- Ypthima asterope (Klug, 1832) Cyprus, Dodecanese, North Aegean Islands

== See also ==
- List of butterflies of Europe (Lycaenidae)
