= List of butterflies of Saimbeyli =

This is a list of butterflies of Saimbeyli, a district located on the middle section of the Taurus Mountains chain in the northern end of Adana Province in southern Turkey. In their three volumes of Die Tagfalter der Türkei, Hesselbarth et al. listed 121 butterfly species from Saimbeyli before 1995. The list was updated with 40 new species which have been recorded in several field studies between 2012 and 2016, and the number of species was determined as 161 in total. S. Wagener argued that Saimbeyli is a valuable habitat for 11 endemic and 15 rare butterfly taxa, and the only locality for Polyommatus theresiae.

== Hesperiidae ==
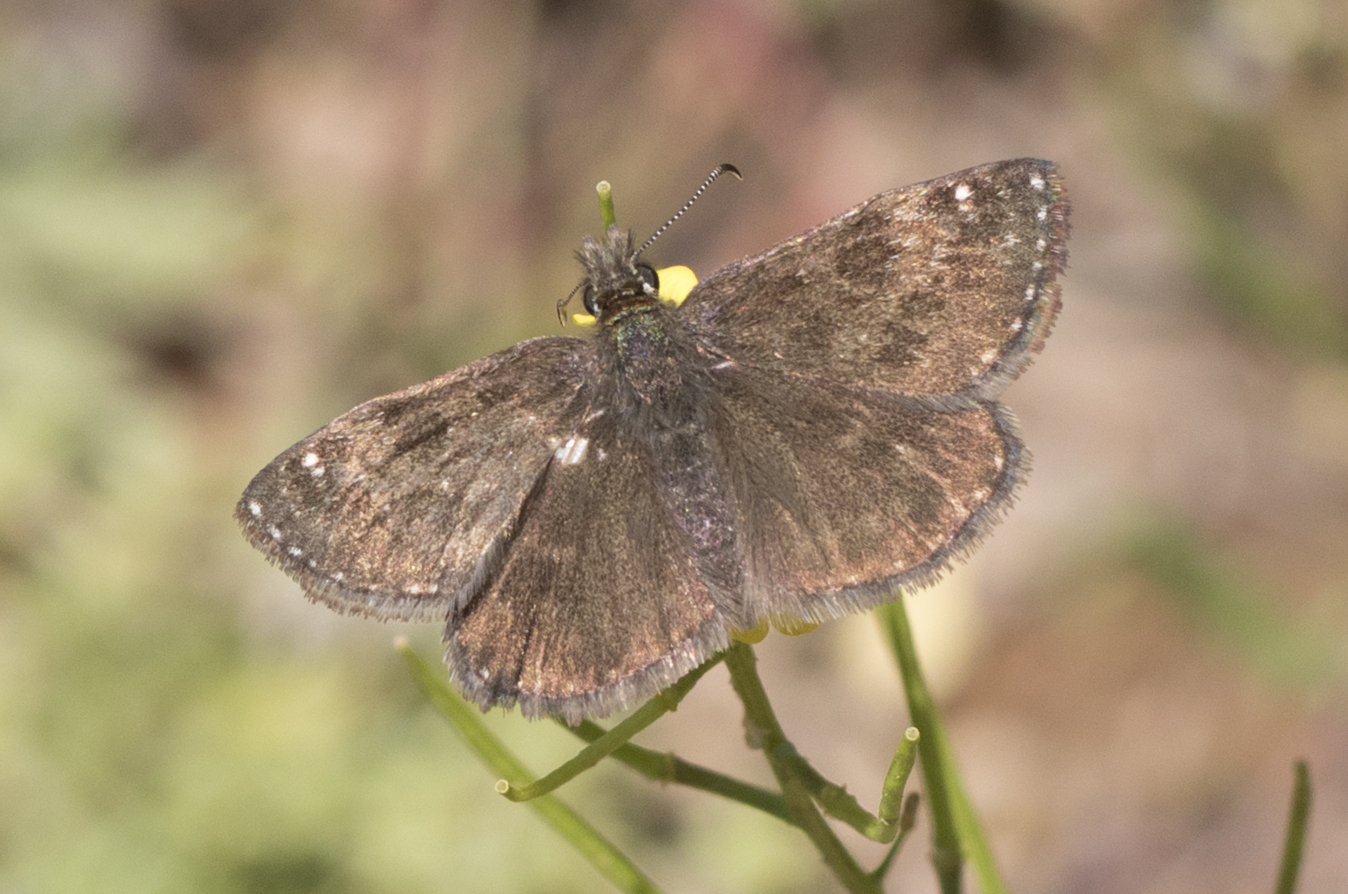
Erynnis tages

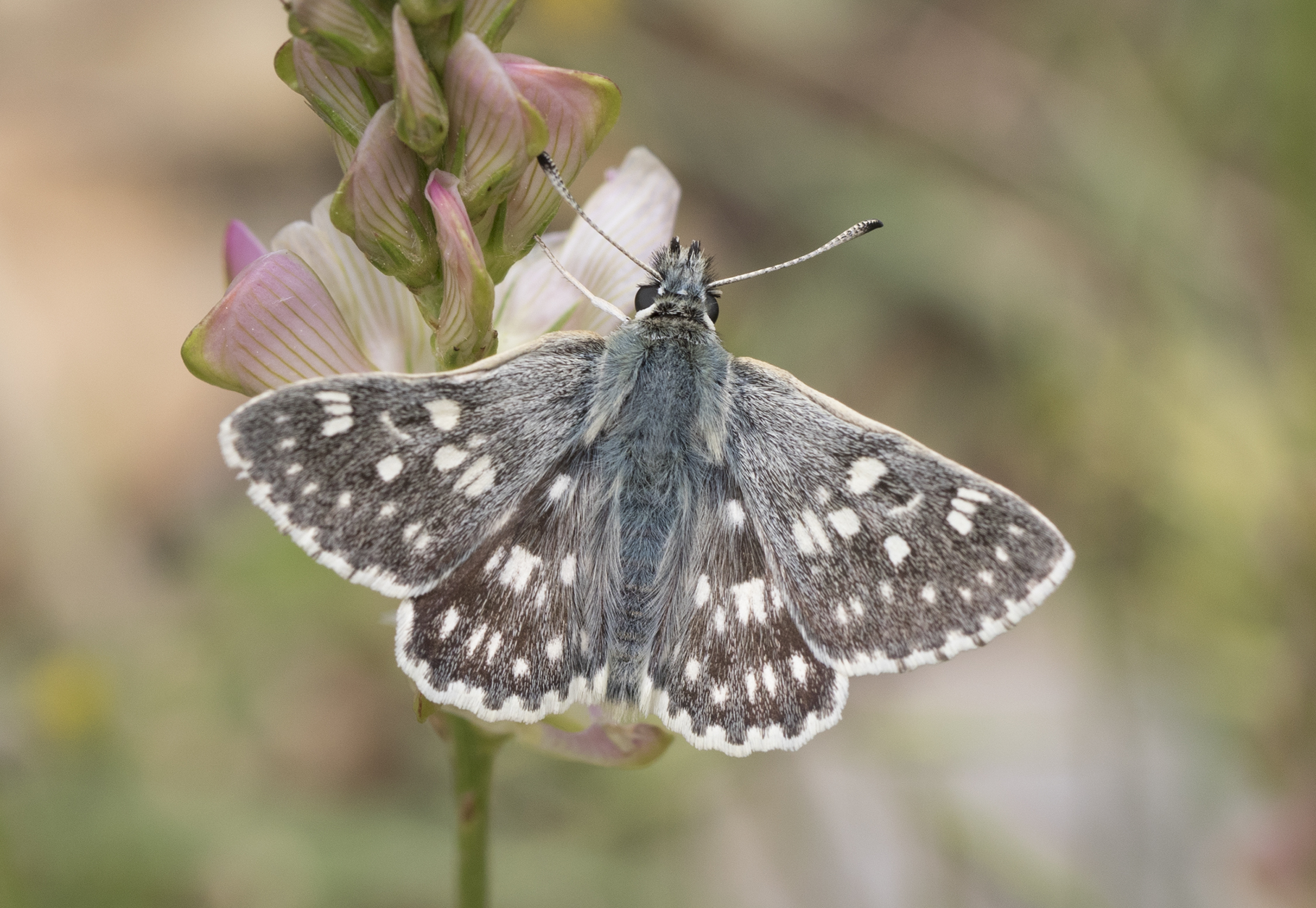
Muschampia nomas

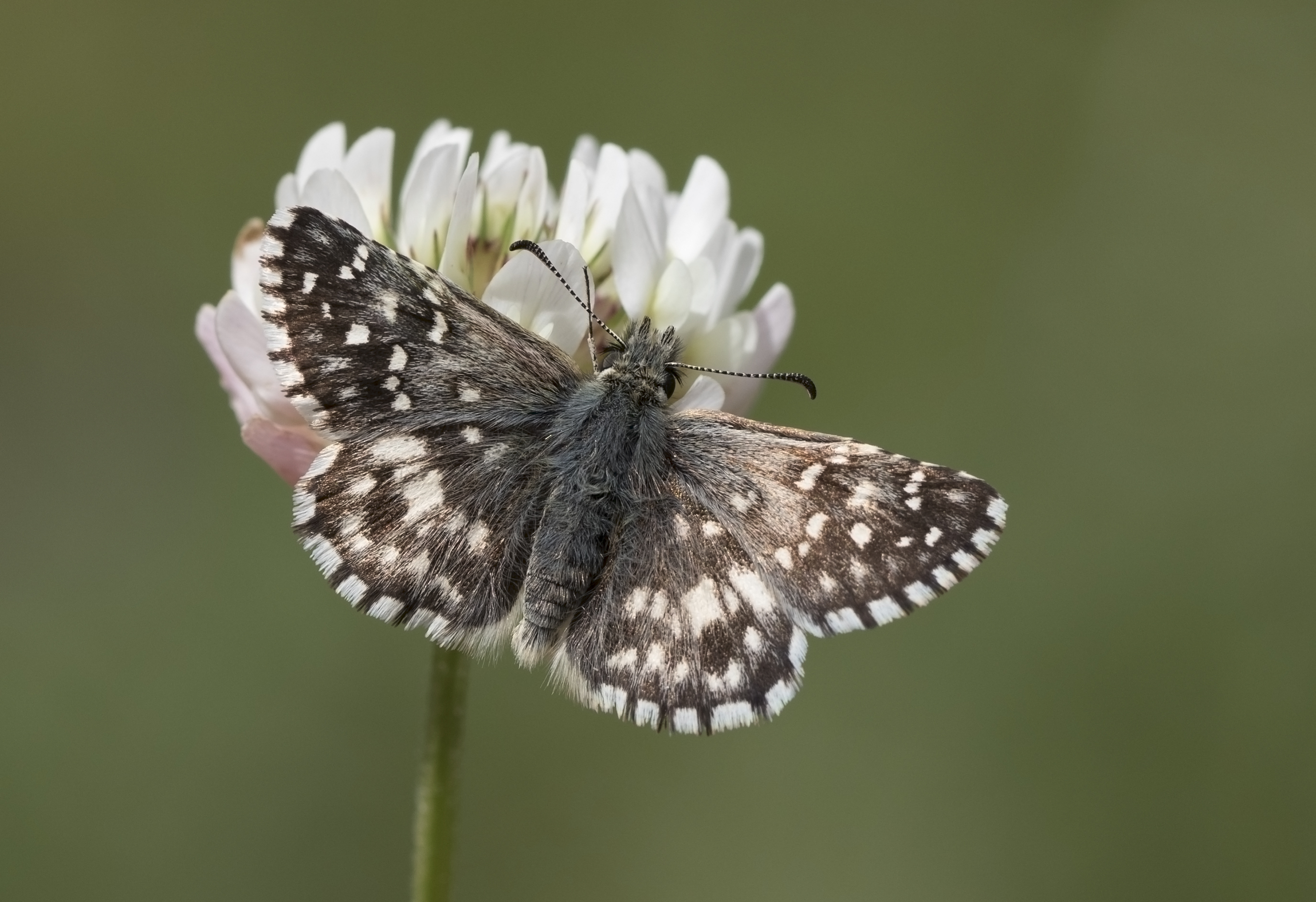
Pyrgus melotis

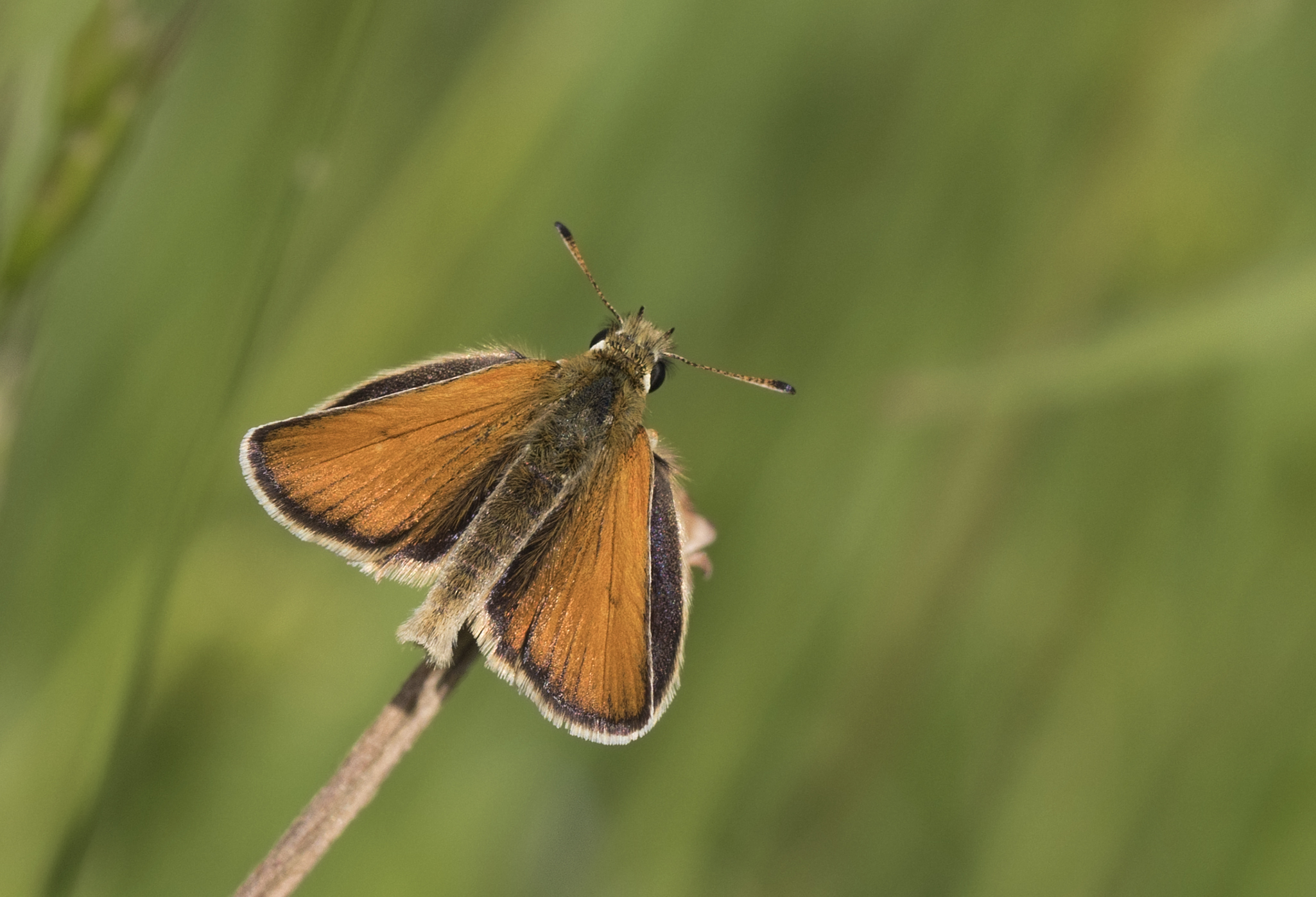
Thymelicus lineolus

Scientific name	English name
Carcharodus alceae	Mallow skipper
Carcharodus lavatherae	Marbled skipper
Carcharodus orientalis	Oriental skipper
Erynnis marloyi	Inky skipper
Erynnis tages	Dingy skipper
Gegenes pumilio	Pigmy skipper
Hesperia comma	Silver-spotted skipper
Muschampia nomas	Syrian skipper
Muschampia poggei	Pogge's skipper
Muschampia proteides	Anatolian skipper
Muschampia proto	Sage skipper
Muschampia tessellum	Tessellated skipper
Ochlodes sylvanus	Large skipper
Pyrgus armoricanus	Oberthur's grizzled skipper
Pyrgus cinarae	Sandy grizzled skipper
Pyrgus melotis	Aegean skipper
Pyrgus serratulae	Olive skipper
Pyrgus sidae	Yellow-banded skipper
Spialia orbifer	Red underwing skipper
Spialia phlomidis	Persian skipper
Thymelicus acteon	Lulworth skipper
Thymelicus hyrax	Levantine skipper
Thymelicus lineolus	Essex skipper
Thymelicus sylvestris	Small skipper

== Lycaenidae ==
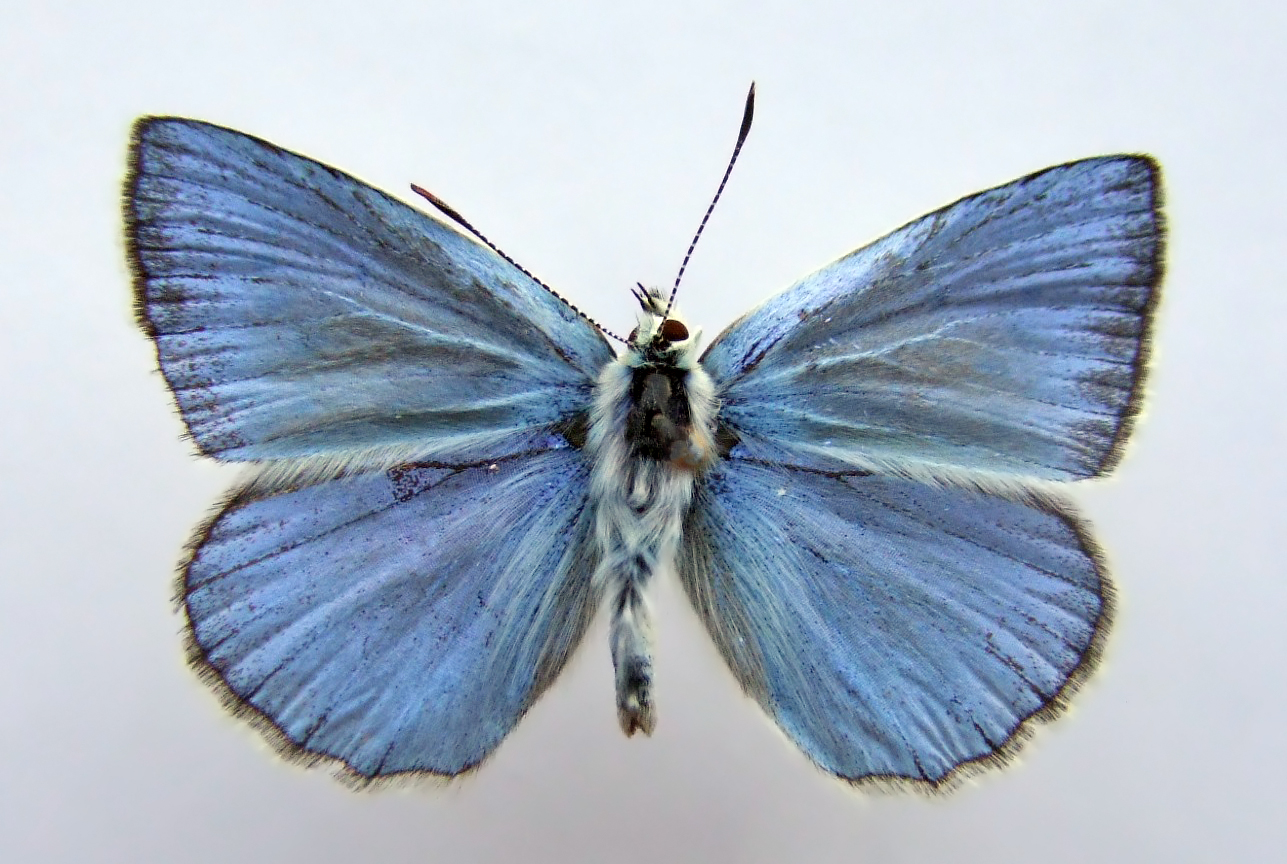
Polyommatus theresiae

Scientific name	English name
Aricia agestis	Brown argus
Aricia anteros	Blue argus
Aricia isauricus	Taurus blue
Callophrys rubi	Green hairstreak
Celastrina argiolus	Holly blue
Cigaritis acamas	Tawny silverline
Cigaritis cilissa	Levant silverline
Cupido minimus	Little blue
Cupido osiris	Osiris blue
Cyaniris bellis antiochena	Hatay's Mazarine blue
Freyeria trochylus	Grass jewel
Glaucopsyche alexis	Green-underside blue
Iolana iolas	Iolas blue
Kretania eurypilus	Eastern brown argus
Kretania modica	Anatolian zephyr blue
Lampides boeticus	Pea blue
Lycaena alciphron	Purple-shot copper
Lycaena asabinus	Anatolian fiery copper
Lycaena ochimus	Turkish fiery copper
Lycaena phlaeas	Small copper
Lycaena thersamon	Lesser fiery copper
Lycaena thetis	Fiery copper
Lycaena tityrus	Sooty copper
Lysandra bellargus	Adonis blue
Lysandra ossmar	Anatolian chalk blue
Lysandra syriaca	Lebanese Adonis blue
Neolysandra coelestina	Pontic blue
Neozephyrus quercus	Purple hairstreak
Plebejidea loewii	Large jewel blue
Plebejus argus	Silver-studded blue
Plebejus idas	Idas blue
Polyommatus admetus	Anomalous blue
Polyommatus alcestis	Lebanese anomalous blue
Polyommatus amandus	Amanda's blue
Polyommatus cornelius	Small Anatolian blue
Polyommatus daphnis	Meleager's blue
Polyommatus dorylas	Turquoise blue
Polyommatus eurypilos	Gerhard's blue
Polyommatus firdussii	Firdussi's blue
Polyommatus hopfferi	Hopfer's blue
Polyommatus icarus	Common blue
Polyommatus iphigenia	Iphigenia blue
Polyommatus maraschi	Marash blue
Polyommatus menalcas	Turkish furry blue
Polyommatus poseidon	Poseidon blue
Polyommatus ripartii	Ripart's anomalous blue
Polyommatus sertavulensis	Sertavul blue
Polyommatus theresiae	Saimbeyli blue
Polyommatus thersites	Chapman's blue
Polyommatus wagneri	Wagner's blue
Pseudophilotes bavius	Bavius blue
Pseudophilotes vicrama	Lesser chequered blue
Satyrium abdominalis	Gerhard's black hairstreak
Satyrium acaciae	Sloe hairstreak
Satyrium ilicis	Ilex hairstreak
Satyrium spini	Blue-spot hairstreak
Satyrium w-album	White-letter hairstreak
Tarucus balkanicus	Little tiger blue
Tomares nesimachus	Akbes vernal copper
Tomares nogelii	Anatolian vernal copper
Turanana endymion	Odd-spot blue

== Nymphalidae ==
Scientific name	English name
Aglais urticae	Small tortoiseshell
Arethusana arethusa	False grayling
Argynnis pandora	Cardinal
Argynnis paphia	Silver-washed fritillary
Brenthis daphne	Marbled fritillary
Brintesia circe	Great banded grayling
Charaxes jasius	Twin-tailed pasha
Chazara bischoffi	Orange hermit
Chazara briseis	Hermit
Coenonympha pamphilus	Small heath
Fabriciana adippe	High brown fritillary
Fabriciana niobe	Niobe fritillary
Hipparchia fatua	Freyer's grayling
Hipparchia mersina	Mersin grayling
Hipparchia pellucida	Anatolian reddish grayling
Hipparchia statilinus	Tree grayling
Hipparchia syriaca	Syrian rock grayling
Hyponephele lupinus	Oriental steppe brown
Hyponephele lycaon	Dusky steppe brown
Issoria lathonia	Queen of Spain fritillary
Kirinia roxelana	Lattice brown
Lasiommata maera	Large wall brown
Lasiommata megera	Wall brown
Limenitis reducta	Southern white admiral
Maniola jurtina	Meadow brown
Maniola telmessia	Eastern meadow brown
Melanargia syriaca	Syrian marbled white
Melitaea arduinna	Freyer's grayling fritillary
Melitaea cinxia	Glanville fritillary
Melitaea collina	Hatay's fritillary
Melitaea didyma	Spotted fritillary
Melitaea phobe	Knapweed fritillary
Melitaea punica	Algerian fritillary
Melitaea trivia	Lesser spotted fritillary
Nymphalis xanthomelas	Scarce tortoiseshell
Pararge aegeria	Speckled wood
Polygonia c-album	Comma
Polygonia egea	Southern comma
Pseudochazara anthelea	White-banded tawny rockbrown
Pseudochazara lydia	Lydian tawny rockbrown
Pseudochazara mamurra	Anatolian tawny rockbrown
Pseudochazara mniszechii	Tawny rockbrown
Pseudochazara pelopea	Klug's tawny rockbrown
Satyrus favonius	Anatolian satyr
Satyrus ferula	Great sooty satyr
Speyeria aglaja	Dark green fritillary
Thaleropis ionia	Ionian emperor
Vanessa atalanta	Red admiral
Vanessa cardui	Painted lady

== Papilionidae ==
Scientific name	English name
Archon apollinus	False Apollo
Iphiclides podalirius	Scarce swallowtail
Papilio alexanor	Southern swallowtail
Papilio machaon	Swallowtail
Parnassius apollo	Apollo
Parnassius mnemosyne	Clouded Apollo
Zerynthia cerisy	Eastern festoon
Zerynthia deyrollei	Eastern steppe festoon

== Pieridae ==
Scientific name	English name
Anthocharis cardamines	Orange tip
Anthocharis damone	Eastern orange tip
Anthocharis gruneri	Gruener's orange tip
Aporia crataegi	Black-veined white
Colias alfacariensis	Berger's clouded yellow
Colias aurorina	Anatolian clouded yellow
Colias croceus	Clouded yellow
Euchloe penia	Eastern greenish black tip
Gonepteryx farinosa	Powdered brimstone
Gonepteryx rhamni	Common brimstone
Leptidea duponcheli	Eastern wood white
Leptidea sinapis	Wood white
Pieris brassicae	Large white
Pieris ergane	Mountain small white
Pieris krueperi	Krueper's small white
Pieris mannii	Southern small white
Pieris pseudorapae	False small white
Pieris rapae	Small white
Pontia edusa	New Bath white

== See also ==
- List of butterflies of Turkey
