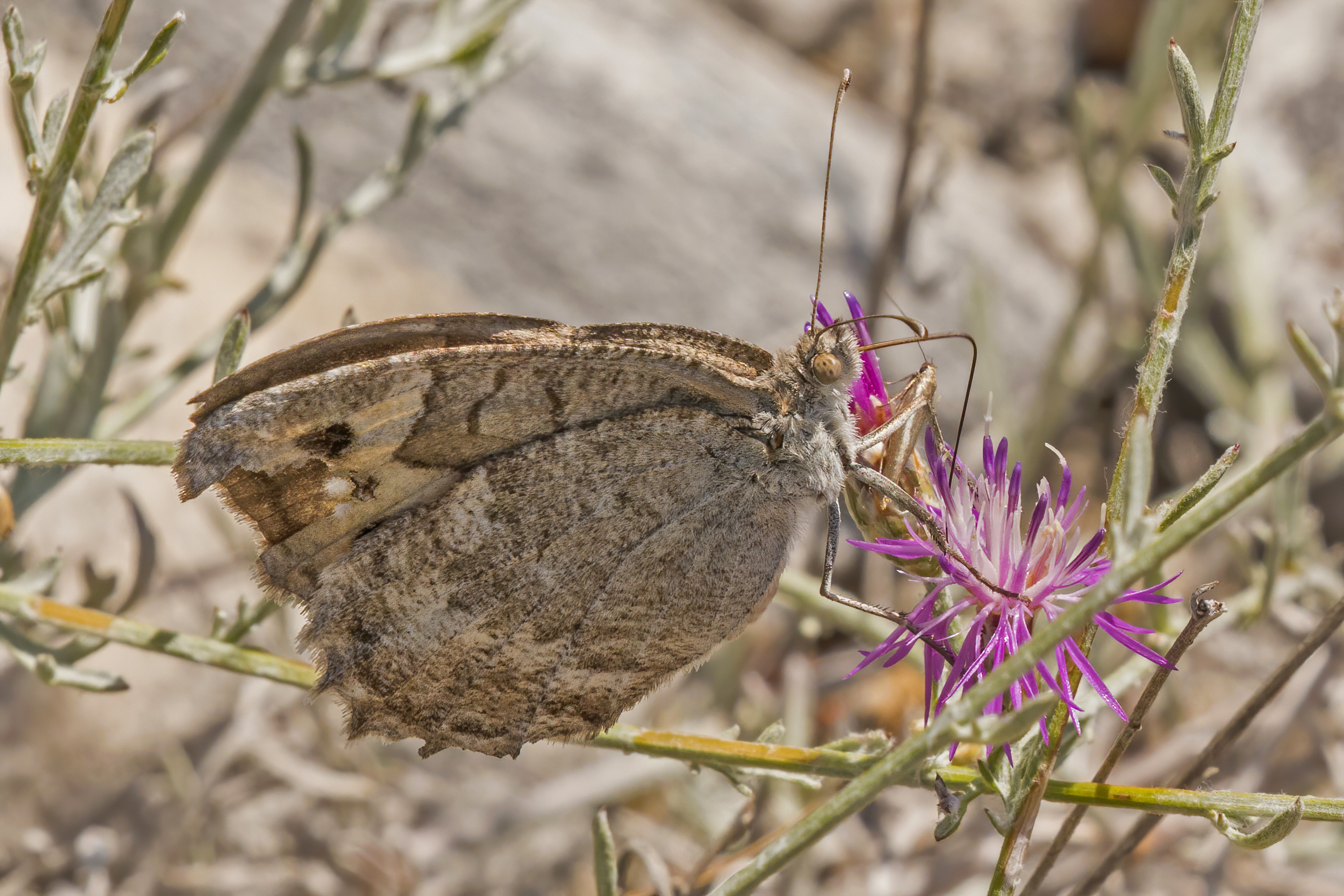
- near Pletvar, North Macedonia

Conservation status
- Critically Endangered (IUCN 3.1)

Scientific classification
- Kingdom: Animalia
- Phylum: Arthropoda
- Clade: Pancrustacea
- Class: Insecta
- Order: Lepidoptera
- Family: Nymphalidae
- Genus: Pseudochazara
- Species: P. cingovskii

Binomial name
- Pseudochazara cingovskii (Gross, 1973)

= Pseudochazara cingovskii =

Species of butterfly

Pseudochazara cingovskii, the Macedonian grayling, is a species of butterfly in the family Nymphalidae. It is found only in the Macedonian village of Pletvar.

== Taxonomy ==
The species was originally named Satyrus sintenisi cingovskii by Gross in 1973. It was later renamed to Pseudochazara cingovskii by Gross in 1978.

== Morphology ==
These species are cool, pale, greyish brown, with upperside bands on wings particularly noticeable.

The wingspan ranges from 43-51 mm (males) and 53-56 mm (females). Adults show sexual dimorphism. Males are typically smaller than females. Male forewings are more pointed, while females' are more rounded with outer margins perpendicular to the inner margin.

Wing uppersides are greyish brown with visible submarginal bands that are paler (sandy yellow, darkening into a more vivid reddish yellow distally), occasionally displaying an overall reddish yellow hue. Two ocelli are white-centered on the forewing band, with two small white dots between them. Smaller white dots appear on the hindwing, often with an inner black frame, mostly in males and relatively less in females. Wind undersides display yellowish-greyish-brown hue in the postdiscal region, while the fringes are greyish white.

Male genitalia feature broad valvae that narrow after a curved midpoint. The distal processes of the valvae are tapered, similar to those of P. orestes. The tegumen is elongated and well-developed, slightly more curved and rounded at the base comparative to other species. The uncus attaches to the tegumen at an angle resembling that of P. graeca. The subunci are wider with developed bases, distinguishing P. cingovskii morphologically from other species.

== Habitat and behavior ==
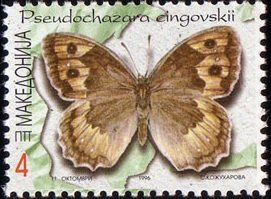
Pseudochazara cingovskii

P. cingovskii is restricted to the Pletvar Massif and nearby mountains near Vitolište in Macedonia. This species inhabits arid, rocky slopes primarily composed of pale metamorphic rocks such as marble and gneiss, with sparse vegetation, at altitudes between 700 and 1700 metres. P. cingovskii is univoltine, flying during July and August. It feeds exclusively on plants from the Poacae family. Geographically, no significant regional variations are noted, due to its restricted distribution area, under 10 km^2. Threatened by mining, these butterflies show limited migration.

Its habitat is scattered with white limestone rocks where it is very difficult to see due to its very pale underside, camouflaging in. The butterfly is facing endangerment, due to marble quarrying in its habitat.

This endemic species is the most threatened butterfly species in Europe, and active conservation efforts are vital for sustaining a healthy population size.

Larvae are reared on grasses.

== Life cycle ==
These species are holometabolous. The larvae emerge in late July alongside other species like P. mniszechii tisiphone and P. anthelea amalthea. The larvae feed on grasses such as Festuca Ovina and Dactylis glomerata. They undergo several molts before pupation, which occurs underground. The pupae are pale, but darken over time. After about a month, the adult emerges from pupa in late January. Adults primarily feed on nectar from flowers such as Acantholimon and Centaurea.
