= Pseudochazara hippolyte =

Scientific classification
- Domain: Eukaryota
- Kingdom: Animalia
- Phylum: Arthropoda
- Class: Insecta
- Order: Lepidoptera
- Family: Nymphalidae
- Genus: Pseudochazara
- Species: P. hippolyte

Binomial name
- Pseudochazara hippolyte (Esper, [1784])

Synonyms
- Papilio hippolyte Esper, 1783

Species of butterfly

Pseudochazara hippolyte is a species of butterfly in the family Nymphalidae. It is confined from the southern Urals across Kazakhstan and northern Tian-Shan to Transbaikalia, Mongolia and northern Tibet.

- A similar species, formerly regarded as a subspecies of Pseudochazara hippolyte, but endemic from south of Spain, is Pseudochazara williamsi.

== Description in Seitz ==
S. hippolyte Esp. (= alcyone F., agave Esp.) (43 b). Similar to the preceding [ S. autonoe ] in size and shape, but the distal band is on both wings broad, sharply defined and yellowish, being distally tinged with yellowish red. In the nymotypical form the hindwing beneath bears 3 distinct dentate lines, the ground-colour being often so darkened between the first two that there appears a dark median band. In Spain and South Russia as well as in Anterior Asia. — The form mercurius Stgr., from the Tian-shan district, has the bands brighter yellow, and in rhena H.-Schiff, from Tokat, they have a strong orange tint. — On the other hand, Elwes found in the higher Altai a smaller form in which the bands are pure pale yellow, not being tinged with orange, but being traversed by the heavy dark veins; this is pallida Stgr. (43b), which is distinguished, moreover, by the underside of the hindwing being minutely but evenly irrorated with dust-grey. — hippolyte is common in June and July at its flight-places, steppes and sterile meadow; it settles on naked places on the ground and flies only a short distance when disturbed, therefore being easy to catch (Elwes).

== Flight period ==
The species is univoltine and is on wing from July to August.

== Food plants ==
Larvae feed on grasses.

== Subspecies ==
- Pseudochazara hippolyte hippolyte
- Pseudochazara hippolyte doerriesi southern Siberia (Tuva region)
- Pseudochazara hippolyte mercurius (Staudinger, 1887) northern Tian Shan, Dzhungarsky Alatau, Saur and Tarbagatai
