= Pseudochazara amalthea =

Conservation status
- Near Threatened (IUCN 3.1)

Scientific classification
- Kingdom: Animalia
- Phylum: Arthropoda
- Clade: Pancrustacea
- Class: Insecta
- Order: Lepidoptera
- Family: Nymphalidae
- Genus: Pseudochazara
- Species: P. amalthea

Binomial name
- Pseudochazara amalthea (Frivaldsky, 1845)

Synonyms
- Hipparchia amalthea Frivaldsky, 1845; Satyrus amalthea

Species of butterfly

Pseudochazara amalthea is a butterfly species belonging to the family Nymphalidae. It can be found in Greece, the Balkans, Crete and Bulgaria in the Struma Valley south of the Kresna Gorge.

The wingspan is 45–65 mm. The butterflies fly from June to August.

== Taxonomy ==
The species is often treated as a subspecies of Pseudochazara anthelea.
