= Pseudochazara kanishka =

Scientific classification
- Kingdom: Animalia
- Phylum: Arthropoda
- Class: Insecta
- Order: Lepidoptera
- Family: Nymphalidae
- Genus: Pseudochazara
- Species: P. kanishka

Binomial name
- Pseudochazara kanishka (Aussem, 1980)

Species of butterfly

Pseudochazara kanishka is a species of butterfly in the family Nymphalidae. It is confined to northern Afghanistan and southern Tajikistan.

== Flight period ==
The species is univoltine and is on wing from June to August.

== Food plants ==
Larvae feed on grasses.
