= Pseudochazara porphyritica =

Scientific classification
- Domain: Eukaryota
- Kingdom: Animalia
- Phylum: Arthropoda
- Class: Insecta
- Order: Lepidoptera
- Family: Nymphalidae
- Genus: Pseudochazara
- Species: P. porphyritica

Binomial name
- Pseudochazara porphyritica Clench & Shoumatoff, 1956

Species of butterfly

Pseudochazara porphyritica is a species of butterfly in the family Nymphalidae. It is confined to Panjao –Pakistan, bordering Afghanistan.

== Flight period ==
Unknown.

== Food plants ==
Larvae feed on grasses.
