= Pseudochazara alpina =

Scientific classification
- Domain: Eukaryota
- Kingdom: Animalia
- Phylum: Arthropoda
- Class: Insecta
- Order: Lepidoptera
- Family: Nymphalidae
- Genus: Pseudochazara
- Species: P. alpina

Binomial name
- Pseudochazara alpina (Staudinger, 1878)

Synonyms
- Satyrus pelopea var. alpina Staudinger, 1878

Species of butterfly

Pseudochazara alpina is a species of butterfly in the family Nymphalidae. It is confined to the Caucasus in Dagestan.

== Flight period ==
The species is univoltine, being on wing from July to August.

== Food plants ==
Larvae feed on grasses.

== Subspecies ==
- Pseudochazara alpina alpina
- Pseudochazara alpina guriensis (Staudinger, 1878) Akhaltsikhe, Georgia
- Pseudochazara alpina rjabovi (Sheljuzhko, 1935) Untsukul - Chirkata pass, Dagestan
