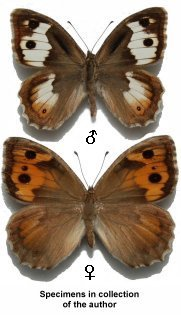
- Pseudochazara anthelea

Scientific classification
- Domain: Eukaryota
- Kingdom: Animalia
- Phylum: Arthropoda
- Class: Insecta
- Order: Lepidoptera
- Family: Nymphalidae
- Subfamily: Satyrinae
- Tribe: Satyrini
- Subtribe: Satyrina
- Genus: Pseudochazara de Lesse, 1951

= Pseudochazara =

Genus of butterflies

Pseudochazara is a genus of butterflies within the family Nymphalidae.

== Species ==
- Pseudochazara alpina (Staudinger, 1878)
- Pseudochazara amalthea (Frivaldsky, 1845)
- Pseudochazara anthelea (Hübner, [1823-1824])
- Pseudochazara atlantis (Austaut, 1905)
- Pseudochazara baldiva (Moore, 1865)
- Pseudochazara beroe (Herrich-Schäffer, [1844])
- Pseudochazara cingovskii Gross, 1973
- Pseudochazara daghestana Holik, 1955
- Pseudochazara droshica (Tytler, 1926)
- Pseudochazara euxina (Kuznetsov, 1909)
- Pseudochazara geyeri (Herrich-Schäffer, [1846])
- Pseudochazara gilgitica (Tytler, 1926)
- Pseudochazara graeca (Staudinger, 1870)
- Pseudochazara hippolyte (Esper, 1783)
- Pseudochazara kanishka Aussem, 1980
- Pseudochazara lydia (Staudinger, 1878)
- Pseudochazara mamurra (Herrich-Schäffer, [1846])
- Pseudochazara mniszechii (Herrich-Schäffer, [1851])
- Pseudochazara orestes de Prins & Poorten, 1981
- Pseudochazara pallida (Staudinger, 1901)
- Pseudochazara panjshira Wyat & Omoto, 1966
- Pseudochazara pelopea (Klug, 1832)
- Pseudochazara porphyritica Clench & Shoumatoff, 1956
- Pseudochazara schahrudensis (Staudinger, 1881)
- Pseudochazara schakuhensis (Staudinger, 1881)
- Pseudochazara thelephassa (Geyer, [1827])
- Pseudochazara turkestana (Grum-Grshimailo, 1882)
- Pseudochazara watsoni (Clench & Shoumatoff, 1956)
- Pseudochazara williamsi Romei, 1927
