= Pseudochazara schakuhensis =

Scientific classification
- Domain: Eukaryota
- Kingdom: Animalia
- Phylum: Arthropoda
- Class: Insecta
- Order: Lepidoptera
- Family: Nymphalidae
- Genus: Pseudochazara
- Species: P. schakuhensis

Binomial name
- Pseudochazara schakuhensis (Staudinger, 1881)

Synonyms
- Satyrus mamurra schakuhensis Staudinger, 1881

Species of butterfly

Pseudochazara schakuhensis is a species of butterfly in the family Nymphalidae. It is confined to the Alborz and Kopet-Dagh mountains.

== Flight period ==
The species is univoltine and is on wing from mid-July to September.

== Food plants ==
Larvae feed on grasses.
