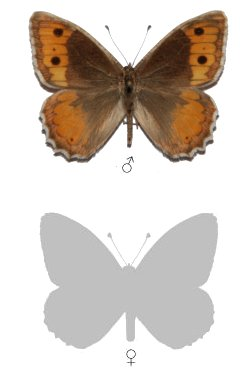

Scientific classification
- Kingdom: Animalia
- Phylum: Arthropoda
- Clade: Pancrustacea
- Class: Insecta
- Order: Lepidoptera
- Family: Nymphalidae
- Genus: Pseudochazara
- Species: P. baldiva

Binomial name
- Pseudochazara baldiva (Moore, 1865)

Synonyms
- Lasiommata baldiva Moore, 1865; Satyrus baldiva

= Pseudochazara baldiva =

Species of butterfly

Pseudochazara baldiva is a butterfly species belonging to the family Nymphalidae described by Frederic Moore in 1865. It can be found in the Himalayas, Kashmir, Tibet and India.

The wingspan is 40–55 mm. The butterflies fly from June to July.
