= Pseudochazara droshica =

Scientific classification
- Domain: Eukaryota
- Kingdom: Animalia
- Phylum: Arthropoda
- Class: Insecta
- Order: Lepidoptera
- Family: Nymphalidae
- Genus: Pseudochazara
- Species: P. droshica

Binomial name
- Pseudochazara droshica (Tytler, 1926)

Species of butterfly

Pseudochazara droshica is a species of butterfly in the family Nymphalidae. It is found from Drosh, southern Chitral and in the Shandur Pass in north-east Chitral.

== Flight period ==
The species is univoltine and on wing from late July to early August.

== Food plants ==
Larvae feed on grasses.
