= Pseudochazara turkestana =

Scientific classification
- Domain: Eukaryota
- Kingdom: Animalia
- Phylum: Arthropoda
- Class: Insecta
- Order: Lepidoptera
- Family: Nymphalidae
- Genus: Pseudochazara
- Species: P. turkestana

Binomial name
- Pseudochazara turkestana (Grum-Grshimailo, 1893)

Synonyms
- Satyrus lehana var. turkestana Grum-Grshimailo, 1893

Species of butterfly

Pseudochazara turkestana is a species of butterfly in the family Nymphalidae. It is confined to Afghanistan through the mountains of Middle Asia to the south-west Altai.

== Flight period ==
The species is univoltine and is on wing from June to August.

== Food plants ==
Larvae feed on grasses.

== Subspecies ==
- Pseudochazara turkestana turkestana Afghanistan
- Pseudochazara turkestana esquilinus (Fruhstorfer, 1911) Alay Mountains
- Pseudochazara turkestana sagina (Ruhl, [1894]) Tajikistan, Ghissar, southern Ghissar, Darvaz, the western Pamirs
- Pseudochazara turkestana tarbagata (Staudinger, 1901) Dzhungarsky Alatau, Saur and Tarbagatai, Kazakhstan, the south-west Altai
