= Pseudochazara watsoni =

Scientific classification
- Domain: Eukaryota
- Kingdom: Animalia
- Phylum: Arthropoda
- Class: Insecta
- Order: Lepidoptera
- Family: Nymphalidae
- Genus: Pseudochazara
- Species: P. watsoni

Binomial name
- Pseudochazara watsoni Clench & Shoumatoff, 1956

Species of butterfly

Pseudochazara watsoni is a species of butterfly in the family Nymphalidae. It is confined to Kotal Pass, Khuskak village, central Afghanistan.

== Flight period ==
The species is univoltine and is on wing from July to August.

== Food plants ==
Larvae feed on grasses.
