= Pseudochazara atlantis =

Conservation status
- Least Concern (IUCN 3.1)

Scientific classification
- Kingdom: Animalia
- Phylum: Arthropoda
- Clade: Pancrustacea
- Class: Insecta
- Order: Lepidoptera
- Family: Nymphalidae
- Genus: Pseudochazara
- Species: P. atlantis

Binomial name
- Pseudochazara atlantis (Austaut, 1905)

Synonyms
- Satyrus atlantis Austaut, 1905; Satyrus mniszechi var. maroccana Meade-Waldo, 1905; Satyrus atlantis colini Wyatt, 1952

Species of butterfly

Pseudochazara atlantis is a species of butterfly in the family Nymphalidae. It is endemic to Morocco. It flies in barren rocky slopes. The male is found only on large tabular spaces and bare mountain peaks, while the female wanders on the slopes, both for foraging the flowers of Compositae or thyme and to lay her eggs.

== Flight period ==
The species is univoltine, and is on wing from mid-June to early August depending on altitude and locality.

== Food plants ==
Larvae feed on grasses.

== Sources ==
- Michel Tarrier
- Tennent, John, 1996; The Butterflies of Morocco, Algeria and Tunisia; ISBN 0-906802-05-9
