= Pseudochazara gilgitica =

Scientific classification
- Domain: Eukaryota
- Kingdom: Animalia
- Phylum: Arthropoda
- Class: Insecta
- Order: Lepidoptera
- Family: Nymphalidae
- Genus: Pseudochazara
- Species: P. gilgitica

Binomial name
- Pseudochazara gilgitica (Tytler, 1926)

Synonyms
- Eumenis lehana gilgitica Tytler, 1926; Pseudochazara pakistana Gross, 1978

Species of butterfly

Pseudochazara gilgitica is a species of butterfly in the family Nymphalidae. It is confined to the north-western Himalayas and the west of the Hindu Kush to the west of the Pamirs.

== Flight period ==
The species is univoltine and is on wing from July to August.

== Food plants ==
Larvae feed on grasses.
