= Pseudochazara panjshira =

Scientific classification
- Domain: Eukaryota
- Kingdom: Animalia
- Phylum: Arthropoda
- Class: Insecta
- Order: Lepidoptera
- Family: Nymphalidae
- Genus: Pseudochazara
- Species: P. panjshira

Binomial name
- Pseudochazara panjshira Wyatt & Omoto, 1966

Species of butterfly

Pseudochazara panjshira is a species of butterfly in the family Nymphalidae. It is confined to Kopet-Dagh, the Hindu Kush and Alai. The habitat consists of dry stony slopes at altitudes ranging from 1,500 to 3,500 meters.

== Flight period ==
The species is univoltine and is on wing from July to August.

== Food plants ==
Larvae feed on grasses.

== Subspecies ==
- Pseudochazara panjshira panjshira
- Pseudochazara panjshira kopetdaghi Dubatolov, 1989 (Kopet-Dagh)
- Pseudochazara panjshira badachshana Wyatt & Omoto, 1966 (Alai, Pamirs)
