= Pseudochazara mniszechii =

Scientific classification
- Domain: Eukaryota
- Kingdom: Animalia
- Phylum: Arthropoda
- Class: Insecta
- Order: Lepidoptera
- Family: Nymphalidae
- Genus: Pseudochazara
- Species: P. mniszechii

Binomial name
- Pseudochazara mniszechii (Herrich-Schaffer, [1851])

Synonyms
- Eumenis mniszechii Herrich-Schäffer, [1851]; Eumenis mniszechii Herrich-Schäffer, [1852]; Satyrus pelopea var. caucasica Lederer, 1864

Species of butterfly

Pseudochazara mniszechii, the tawny rockbrown, is a species of butterfly in the family Nymphalidae. It is confined to Greece, Turkey, northern Iran, Balochistan, and the Caucasus.

== Flight period ==
The species is univoltine and is on wing from the end of June to mid-September.

== Food plants ==
Larvae feed on grasses.

== Subspecies ==
- Pseudochazara mniszechii mniszechii Turkey
- Pseudochazara mniszechii caucasica (Lederer, 1864) Erzincan, Erzurum, Gumushane, Kars, Tunceli and Bayburt, Ardahan - Turkey (also seen in Transcaucasia)
- Pseudochazara mniszechii tisiphone (Brown, 1981) Northern Greece, Bursa - Turkey

== Description in Seitz ==
S. mniszechii H.-Schiff. (43 e). Very similar to the preceding [ S. telephassa ], especially in the female sex but with the reddish yellow band of the forewing with the proximal edge less straight, neither being interrupted below the apical ocellus as in the pelopea- forms, nor strongly constricted as in telephassa. The band of the hindwing more even than in telephassa, almost reaching the costal edge. At the anal angle of the hindwing above there are always 2 distinct small white spots. Underside more uniformly sandy grey or sandy brown in both sexes. Size exactly as in telephassa. East-coast of the Black Sea, and Asia Minor. — In herrichii [now subspecies ] Stgr., from North Persia and Turkestan, the fringes are white, the bands of the upperside broader and brighter red -yellow; the hindwing beneath grey, the markings being more distinct in the male.

== Gallery ==
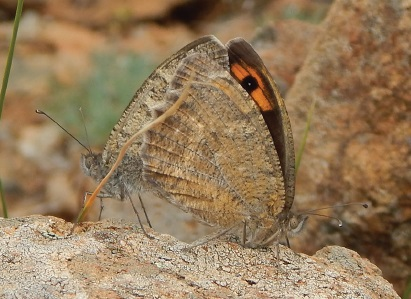
Pseudochazara mniszechii tisiphone mating

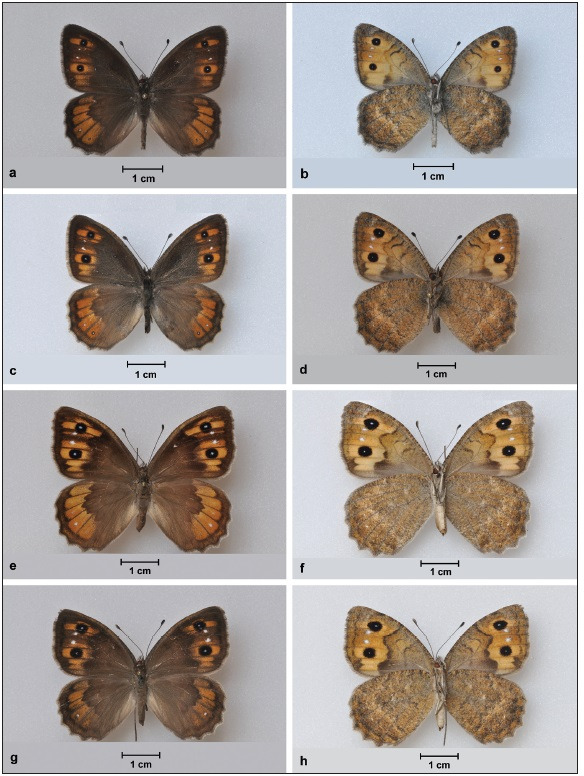
Pseudochazara mniszechii tisiphone variation
