= Pseudochazara pallida =

Scientific classification
- Domain: Eukaryota
- Kingdom: Animalia
- Phylum: Arthropoda
- Class: Insecta
- Order: Lepidoptera
- Family: Nymphalidae
- Genus: Pseudochazara
- Species: P. pallida

Binomial name
- Pseudochazara pallida (Staudinger, 1901)

Species of butterfly

Pseudochazara pallida is a species of butterfly in the family Nymphalidae. It is confined to the southern and eastern Altai.

== Flight period ==
The species is univoltine and is on wing from July to August.

== Food plants ==
Larvae feed on grasses.
