= Pseudochazara lydia =

Scientific classification
- Kingdom: Animalia
- Phylum: Arthropoda
- Class: Insecta
- Order: Lepidoptera
- Family: Nymphalidae
- Genus: Pseudochazara
- Species: P. lydia

Binomial name
- Pseudochazara lydia (Staudinger, 1878)

Synonyms
- Satyrus mamurra var. lydia Staudinger, 1878; Satyrus mamummra var. obscura Staudinger, 1878

Species of butterfly

Pseudochazara lydia is a species of butterfly in the family Nymphalidae. It is confined to Turkey and Asia Minor.

== Flight period ==
The species is univoltine and is on wing from June to September.

== Food plants ==
Larvae feed on grasses.

== Subspecies ==
- Pseudochazara lydia lydia Bilecik, Eskişehir, Manisa, Bursa (Uludağ - Soğukpinar), Afyon (Sultan Dağlari), Konya (Akşehir) - Turkey
- Pseudochazara lydia aurora Eckweiler & Rose, 1989 Antalya, Burdur, Denizli, Isparta, Muğla - Turkey
- Pseudochazara lydia obscura (Staudinger, 1878) Içel (Tekir, Elmah, Boğazi), Antalya (Akseki & Irmasan Geçidi), Konya, Adana (N Saimbeyli) - Turkey
- Pseudochazara lydia neglecta (Gross, 1978) - Turkey;
- Pseudochazara lydia nesrin (Koçak, 1989) - Turkey.
