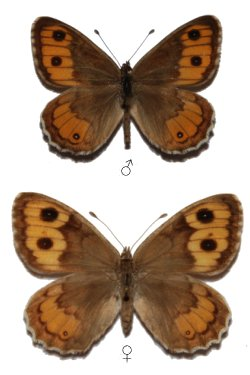

Conservation status
- Endangered (IUCN 3.1)

Scientific classification
- Kingdom: Animalia
- Phylum: Arthropoda
- Class: Insecta
- Order: Lepidoptera
- Family: Nymphalidae
- Genus: Pseudochazara
- Species: P. euxina

Binomial name
- Pseudochazara euxina (Kusnezov, 1909)

Synonyms
- Satyrus euxina

= Pseudochazara euxina =

Species of butterfly

Pseudochazara euxina is a species of butterfly in the family Nymphalidae. It is endemic to Crimea. Its natural habitats are temperate forests and temperate grassland. It is threatened by habitat loss.
