= Pseudochazara schahrudensis =

Scientific classification
- Domain: Eukaryota
- Kingdom: Animalia
- Phylum: Arthropoda
- Class: Insecta
- Order: Lepidoptera
- Family: Nymphalidae
- Genus: Pseudochazara
- Species: P. schahrudensis

Binomial name
- Pseudochazara schahrudensis (Staudinger, 1881)

Synonyms
- Satyrus pelopea schahrudensis Staudinger, 1881

Species of butterfly

Pseudochazara schahrudensis or Shahrud grayling is a species of butterfly in the family Nymphalidae. It is confined to Bitlis, Hakkari, Van, Şırnak in Turkey; to the Caucasus to the eastern Alborz.

== Habitat ==
In Armenia the species occupies dry clayey and stony habitats including semi-deserts and mountain steppes at 1000–2500 metres above sea level.

== Flight period ==
The species is univoltine and is on wing from June to September.

== Food plants ==
Larvae feed on grasses.

== Subspecies ==
- Pseudochazara schahrudensis schahrudensis Turkey, Armenia, and Dagestan
- Pseudochazara schahrudensis nukatli (Bogdanov, 2000) Verkhny (near) Gunib. Nukatl' Mts – Dagestan
