= Satyrium hyrcanicum =

Hyrcanian hairstreak

Scientific classification
- Domain: Eukaryota
- Kingdom: Animalia
- Phylum: Arthropoda
- Class: Insecta
- Order: Lepidoptera
- Family: Lycaenidae
- Genus: Satyrium
- Species: S. hyrcanicum

Binomial name
- Satyrium hyrcanicum (Riley, 1939)

Species of butterfly

Satyrium hyrcanicum, the Hyrcanian hairstreak, is a butterfly in the family Lycaenidae.

== Distribution ==
The range of this species is limited to mountainous areas in northeast Turkey.
