= Pseudochazara graeca =

Scientific classification
- Domain: Eukaryota
- Kingdom: Animalia
- Phylum: Arthropoda
- Class: Insecta
- Order: Lepidoptera
- Family: Nymphalidae
- Genus: Pseudochazara
- Species: P. graeca

Binomial name
- Pseudochazara graeca (Staudinger, 1870)

Species of butterfly

Pseudochazara graeca is a species of butterfly in the family Nymphalidae. In Greece it is confined to Mount Parnassus, Mount Olympus, Mount D'rfis, Mount Chelmos, Mount Panakhaikon, Mount Menalon, Mount Mainalo, Mount Taygetus and Katara Pass in the Pindus Mountains. In North Macedonia it is found on Pelister.

== Description ==
graeca Stgr. (44a), from Greece, is still darker and moreover rather considerably smaller than the previous forms [ of Pseudochazara mamurra].

== Flight period ==
The species is univoltine and is on wing from mid-July to late August.

== Food plants ==
Larvae feed on grasses.

== Subspecies ==
- Pseudochazara graeca graeca Mount Parnassos, Mount Timfrstos
- Pseudochazara graeca apollo (Gross, 1978) Mount Chelmos
- Pseudochazara graeca coutsis (Brown, 1977) Mount Smolikas, Timfi Mountains and Katara Pass
- Pseudochazara graeca pelops (Gross, 1978) Mount Taygetus
