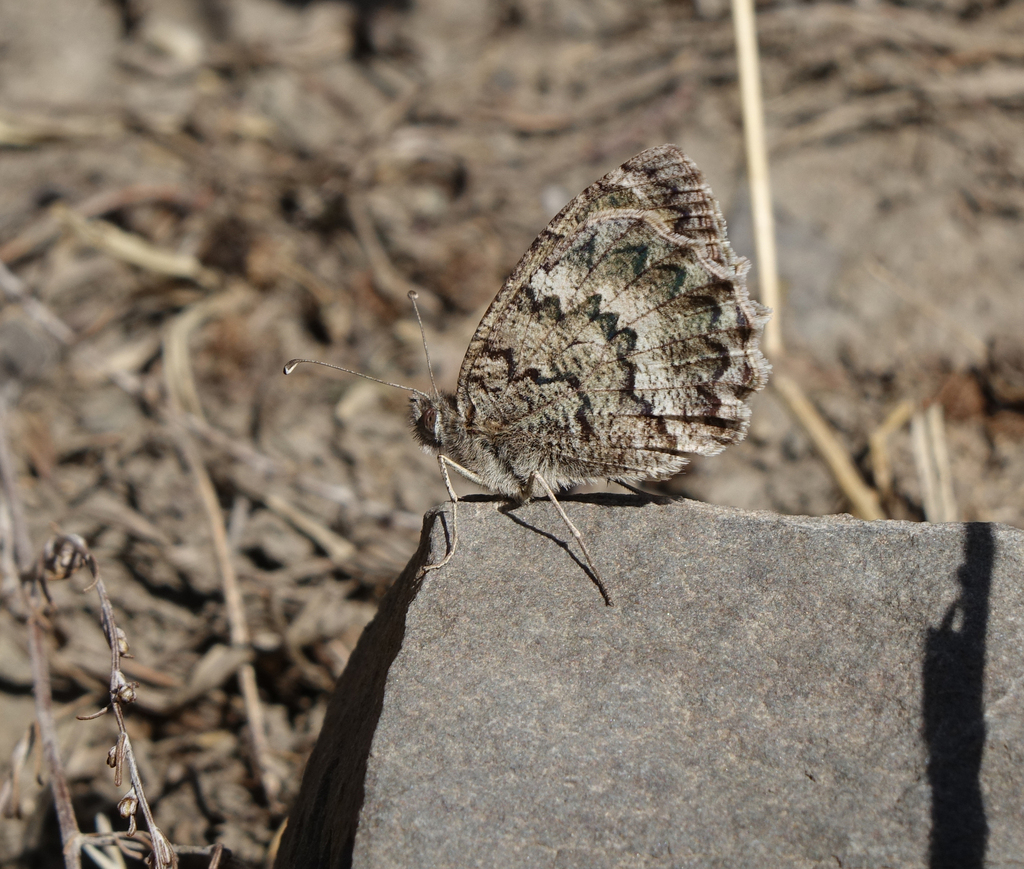

Scientific classification
- Kingdom: Animalia
- Phylum: Arthropoda
- Class: Insecta
- Order: Lepidoptera
- Family: Nymphalidae
- Genus: Pseudochazara
- Species: P. daghestana

Binomial name
- Pseudochazara daghestana Holik, 1955

= Pseudochazara daghestana =

Species of butterfly

Pseudochazara daghestana is a species of butterfly in the family Nymphalidae. It is confined to the Caucasus and Transcaucasia to northern Iran.

== Flight period ==
The species is univoltine and is on wing from July to September.

== Food plants ==
Larvae feed on grasses.

== Subspecies ==
- Pseudochazara daghestana daghestana
- Pseudochazara daghestana savalanica Gross & Ebert, 1975 (Caucasus Minor, Armenian Highland)
