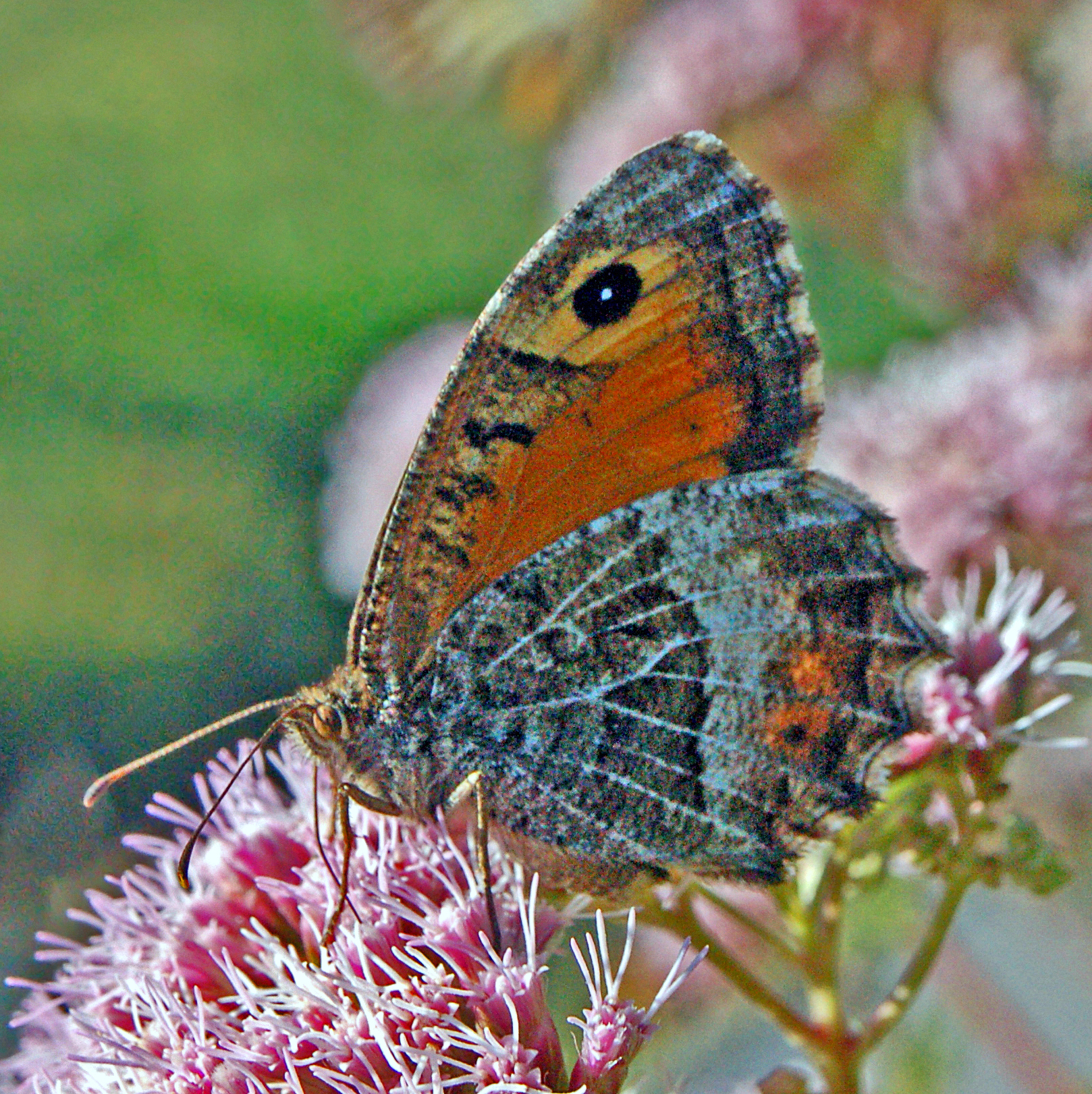
- Arethusana arethusa, underside

Scientific classification
- Kingdom: Animalia
- Phylum: Arthropoda
- Clade: Pancrustacea
- Class: Insecta
- Order: Lepidoptera
- Family: Nymphalidae
- Subtribe: Satyrina
- Genus: Arethusana de Lesse, 1951
- Species: A. arethusa

Binomial name
- Arethusana arethusa (Schiffermüller, 1775)

Synonyms
- Papilio arethusa [Schiffermüller], 1775; Eumenis arethusa veleta Fruhstorfer, 1908; Eumenis arethusa ganda Fruhstorfer, 1909; Eumenis arethusa galatia Fruhstorfer, 1909

= Arethusana =

Genus of butterflies

Arethusana is a butterfly genus within the subfamily Satyrinae of the brush-footed butterfly family (Nymphalidae). It is composed of only one species, Arethusana arethusa, the false grayling.

== Subspecies ==
Subspecies include:

- Arethusana arethusa aksouali Wyatt, 1952 (western Morocco: Toubkal Massif)
- Arethusana arethusa arethusa
- Arethusana arethusa heptapotamica (Stauder, 1924) (Tian Shan, Dzhungarsky Alatau, Saur, Tarbagatai)
- Arethusana arethusa pontica (Heyne, [1895]) (Caucasus, Armenian Highland)
- Arethusana arethusa boabdil (Rambur, 1895) (Granda, Andalusia – Spain)
- Arethusana arethusa dentata (Staudinger, 1871) (Catalonia – Spain)

The subspecies Arethusana arethusa boabdil and Arethusana arethusa dentata are considered as full species by some authors.

== Description ==
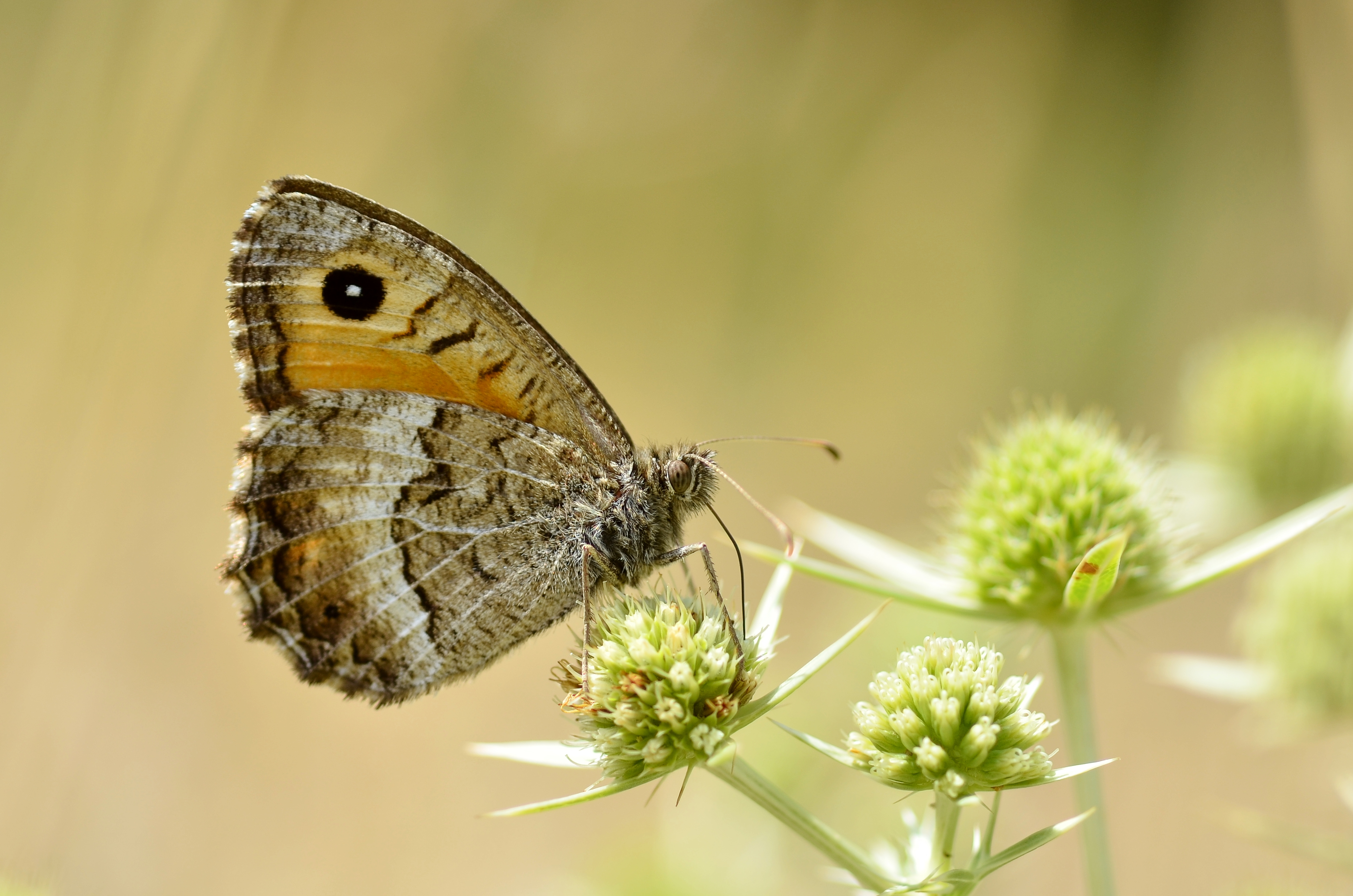
False grayling

Arethusana arethusa has a wingspan of 42–47 millimetres (1.7–1.9 in) in males, of 50–54 millimetres (2.0–2.1 in) in females. The length of the forewings can reach 21–25 mm. The upper surface of the wings is dark brown, with a characteristic series of ocher-orange oval markings forming a V and a blackish brown large spot close to the top of the forewings. Also the hindwings have a small blackish spot near the border. The external edges of the wings has a tooth-shaped pattern. The underside of the hindwings is mottled and shows a transversal whitish band dividing the wing and well marked white veins.

This species is rather similar to Pseudochazara graeca and Pseudochazara orestes.

== Description in Seitz ==
S. arethusa Esp. (43b, c). Above dark brown, with a yellow distal band, which is usually separated into spots in the male, and paler and broader in the female, the apical ocellus being without pupil and the fringes chequered grey and brown. The forewing is yellow beneath, the margin being marmorated with grey like the hindwing. which latter has a dark, in the male sinuous, median line, on the outside of which there is a pale band irrorated with white-grey. The distal band of the upperside varies enormously: it may be broad and continuous, or completely absent from the hindwing and vestigial on the forewing. — In ab. erythia Hbn., from South France and the East, the distal band is slightly dentate, the spots being acuminate: — in ab. dentata. which is the usual form at the Riviera, the spots are evenly and more strongly acuminate, the band therefore resembling a saw. — In boabdil Rbr. (43c) the band, above, is so shaded with smoke colour as to resemble the ground and almost to disappear in the same, only the apical ocellus with very feeble vestiges of the band being more distinct; Spain. — As obscura (43c) Ribbe sent me specimens from Andalusia which are quite black above and very vividly marmorated beneath. — Larva bone-colour, with a red-yellow dorsal-stripe in which there is a thin dark line, a yellow side-stripe and feeble, hardly visible, longitudinal hues; till June on Festuca. The butterflies from July till September, the various forms in some places flying together, being separated in other districts, common on lime-stone mountains, in the whole of South Europe, from Portugal to Turkey and South Russia, everywhere at the Black Sea, eastwards to Saisan in the Altai (Rueckbeil). In Europe the species extends northwards as far as Alsatia, Baden, Hungary (ab. peszerensis) and Galizia. The flight-places are often very distant from one another, being sterile hills and fallow-fields, especially on lime-stone.

== Distribution and habitat ==
This species can be found as far west as Morocco and as far eastward as south-west Siberia and northern Tian Shan. These butterflies prefer grassy and bushy areas, steppes and arid sparse woodlands, at an elevation of 0–2,500 metres (0–8,202 ft) above sea level.

== Biology ==
This species is univoltine. The caterpillars overwinter in the first larval instar. The larvae feed on various grasses, including Festuca, Bromus erectus, Brachypodium pinnatum, Cynosurus cristatus, Corynephorus canescens, Dactylis and Poa species. Adults are on wing from July to September.

== Gallery ==
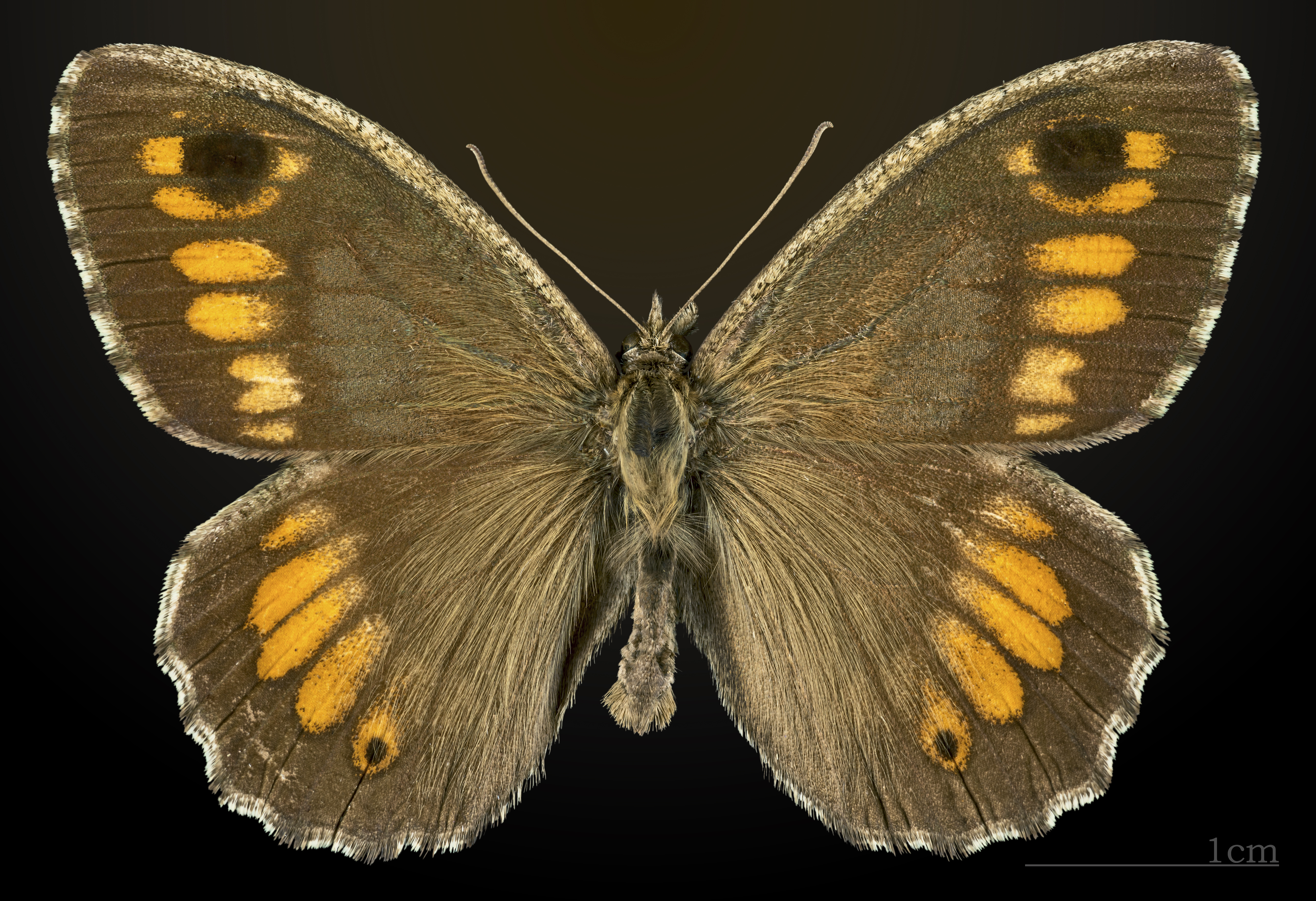
Male, dorsal view

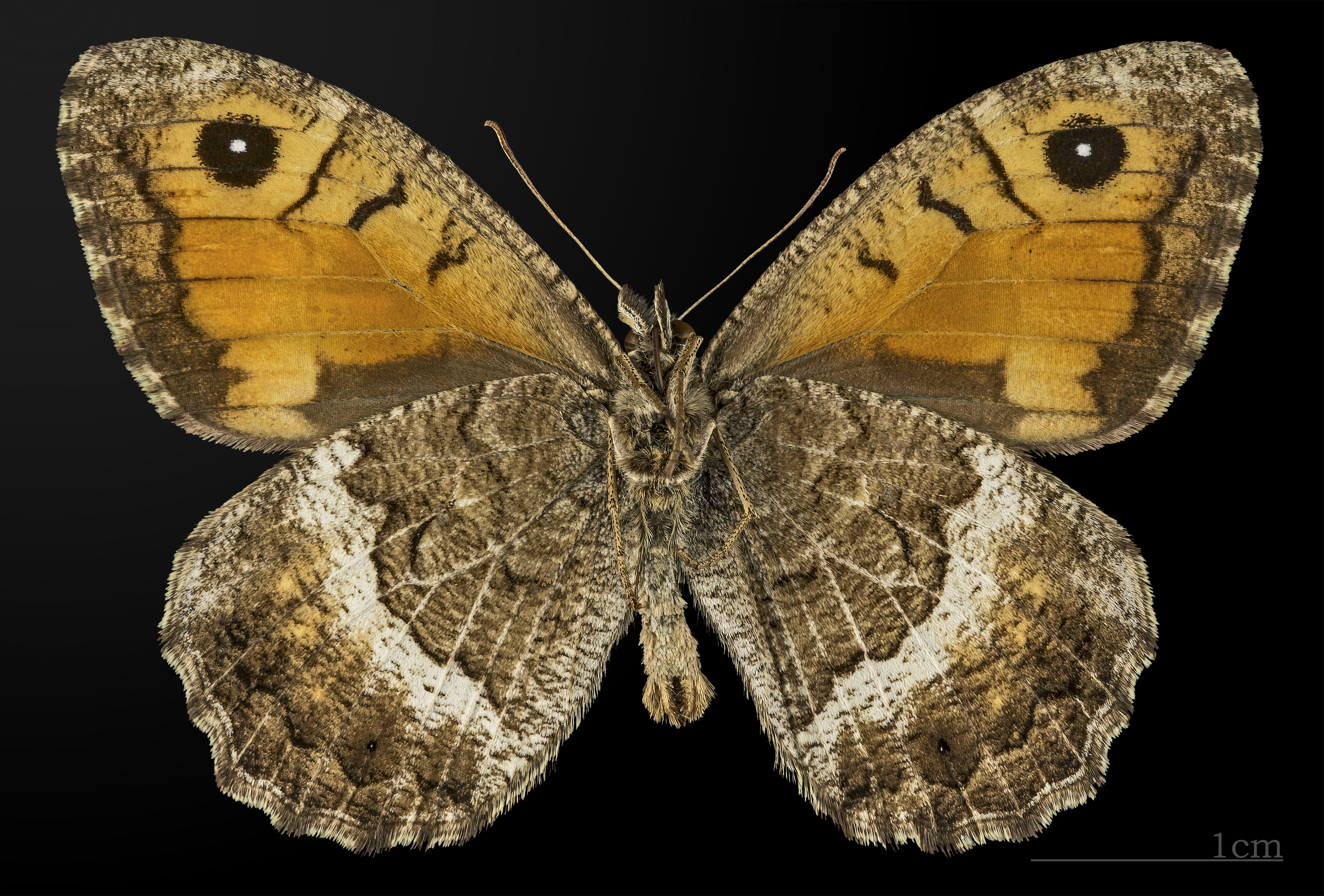
Ventral view

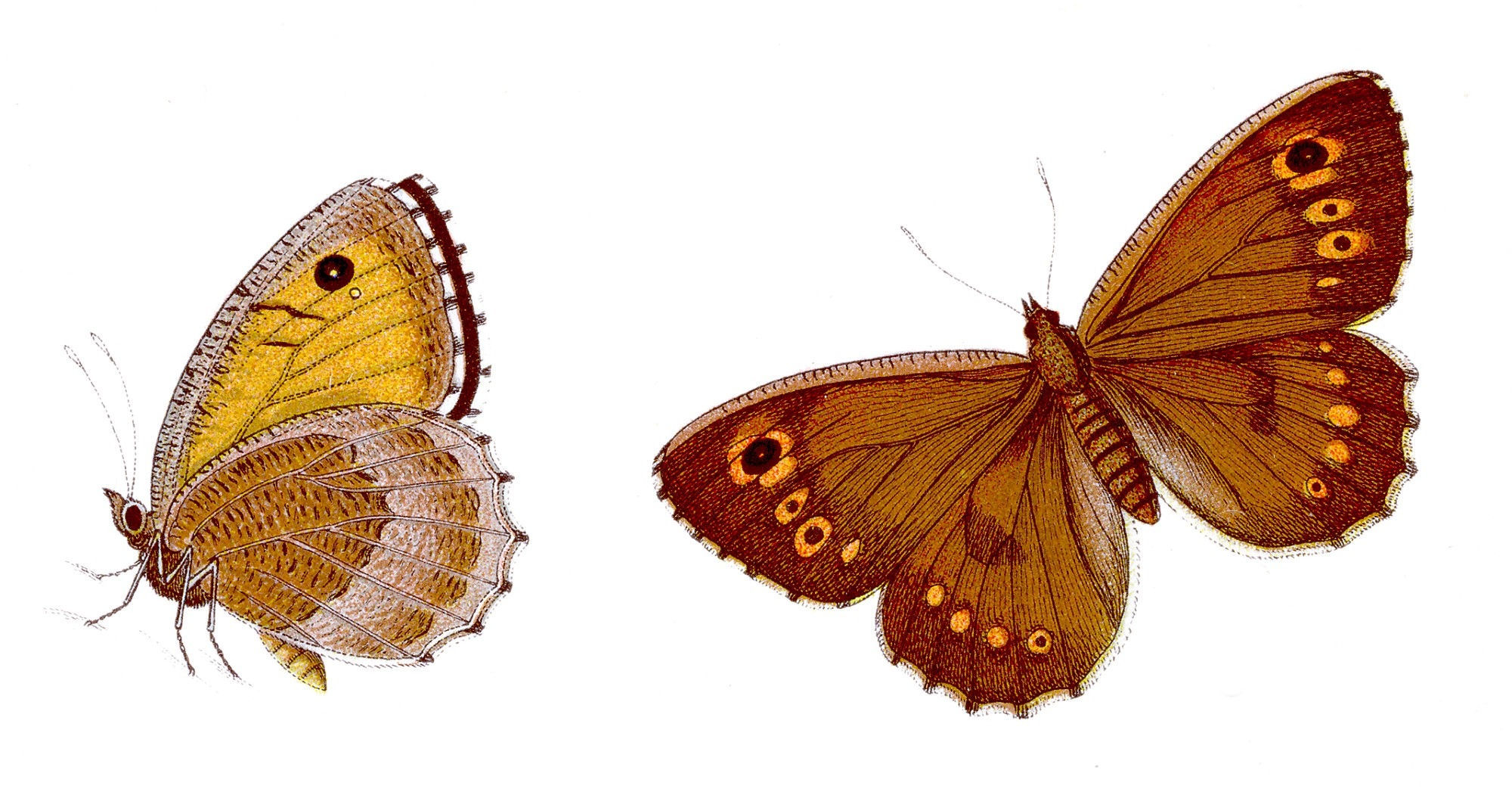
Illustration
