= Chazara bischoffii =

Scientific classification
- Kingdom: Animalia
- Phylum: Arthropoda
- Clade: Pancrustacea
- Class: Insecta
- Order: Lepidoptera
- Family: Nymphalidae
- Genus: Chazara
- Species: C. bischoffii

Binomial name
- Chazara bischoffii (Herrich-Schaffer, [1846])

Synonyms
- Satyrus bischoffii Herrich-Schäffer, [1846]; Satyrus bischoffii var. eginus Staudinger, [1892]; Satyrus bischoffii ab. nigrolimbatus Staudinger, [1892]

Species of butterfly

Chazara bischoffii, the orange hermit, is a butterfly species belonging to the family Nymphalidae. It can be found from Turkey, through Armenia, Iran, Azerbaijan and southern Transcaucasia.

The wingspan is 45–60 mm. The butterflies fly from June to August.
