= Polyommatus aserbeidschanus =

Scientific classification
- Kingdom: Animalia
- Phylum: Arthropoda
- Class: Insecta
- Order: Lepidoptera
- Family: Lycaenidae
- Genus: Polyommatus
- Species: P. aserbeidschanus

Binomial name
- Polyommatus aserbeidschanus (Forster, 1956)

Synonyms
- Agrodiaetus transcaspica aserbeidschana Forster, 1956; Polyommatus aserbeidschana (Forster, 1956)

Species of butterfly

Forster's Blue Polyommatus aserbeidschanus is a butterfly in the family Lycaenidae. It was described by Walter Forster in 1956. It is found in the Caucasus, Armenia and Turkey.

== Life cycle ==
The larvae feed on Astragalus species, thus in Armenia they are found on Astragalus prilipkoanus. The flight period is from late July till mid-August.

== Habitat ==
The species inhabits calcareous grasslands at the elevation from 2,000 to 2,500 m above sea level.

== Subspecies ==
- Polyommatus aserbeidschanus aserbeidschanus
- Polyommatus aserbeidschanus firuza Carbonell, 1993 (northern Turkey)
