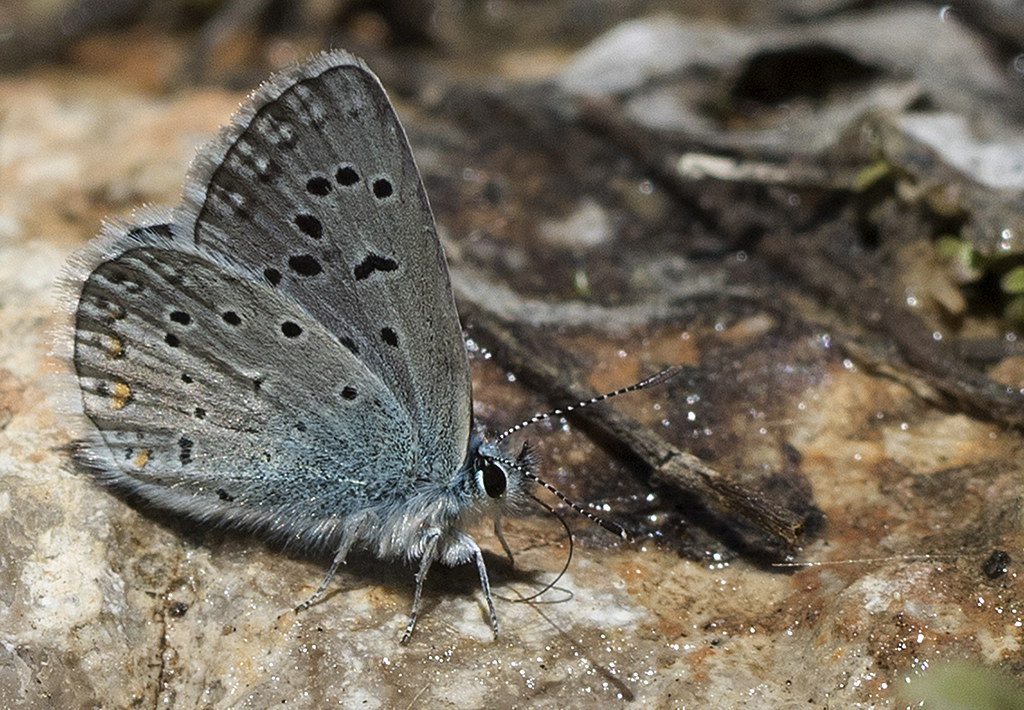

Scientific classification
- Kingdom: Animalia
- Phylum: Arthropoda
- Class: Insecta
- Order: Lepidoptera
- Family: Lycaenidae
- Genus: Polyommatus
- Species: P. myrrha

Binomial name
- Polyommatus myrrha (Herrich-Schäffer, 1851)

Synonyms
- Lycaena myrrha Herrich-Schäffer, 1851; Cupido myrrha

= Polyommatus myrrha =

Species of butterfly

Polyommatus myrrha is a species of butterfly in the family Lycaenidae. It was first described as Lycaena myrrha by Gottlieb August Wilhelm Herrich-Schäffer in 1851 in the six volume Systematische Bearbeitung der Schmetterlinge von Europa (Systematic research on the butterflies of Europe). This rare species has been found in Anatolia area of Turkey. and in the Zangezur Mountains (including both Armenian and Nakhichivan sides), which is inhabited by subspecies P. m. cinyraea Nekrutenko & Effendi, 1979.
