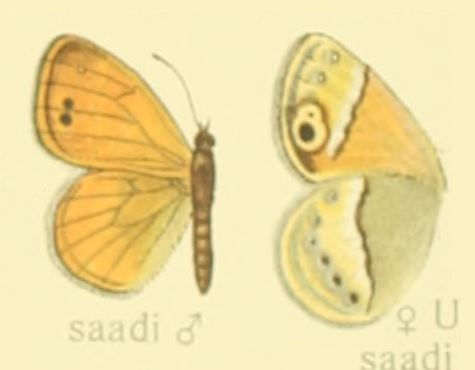

Scientific classification
- Kingdom: Animalia
- Phylum: Arthropoda
- Clade: Pancrustacea
- Class: Insecta
- Order: Lepidoptera
- Family: Nymphalidae
- Genus: Coenonympha
- Species: C. saadi

Binomial name
- Coenonympha saadi Kollar, 1849

Synonyms
- Coenonympha mesopotamica Heyne, [1894]

= Coenonympha saadi =

Saadi heath

Species of butterfly

Coenonympha saadi, the Saadi heath is a butterfly belonging to the family Nymphalidae. The species is distributed in Transcaucasia, Iran, Iraq, and south-eastern Turkey.

Its flight period lasts from early May to late June, sometimes to early July in single generation.

The species inhabits arid sparse woodlands, desert and semi-desert areas. Host plants are Poa annua and other grasses.

== Subspecies ==
- Coenonympha saadi saadi
- Coenonympha saadi iphias Eversmann, 1851 (Transcaucasia)
