= Polyommatus zarathustra =

Scientific classification
- Kingdom: Animalia
- Phylum: Arthropoda
- Class: Insecta
- Order: Lepidoptera
- Family: Lycaenidae
- Genus: Polyommatus
- Species: P. zarathustra

Binomial name
- Polyommatus zarathustra (Eckweiler, 1997)

Synonyms
- Agrodiaetus zarathustra Eckweilr, 1997

Species of butterfly

Polyommatus zarathustra, the Zarathustra blue, is a butterfly of the family Lycaenidae.

== Subspecies ==
Monotypic
