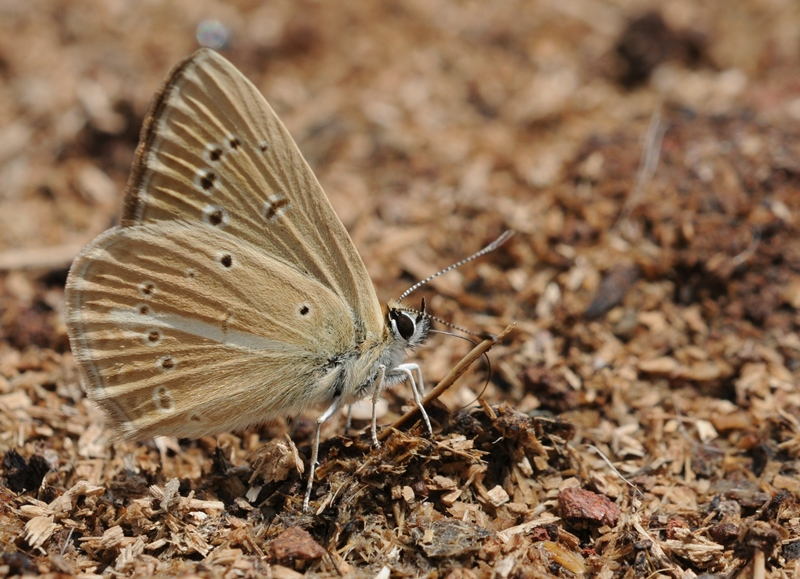
- Male specimen of Polyommatus eriewanensis

Scientific classification
- Kingdom: Animalia
- Phylum: Arthropoda
- Clade: Pancrustacea
- Class: Insecta
- Order: Lepidoptera
- Family: Lycaenidae
- Genus: Polyommatus
- Species: P. eriwanensis

Binomial name
- Polyommatus eriwanensis (Forster, 1960)

= Polyommatus eriwanensis =

Species of butterfly

Polyommatus eriwanensis also known as Yerevan Anomalous Blue is a butterfly in the family Lycaenidae and the genus Polyommatus. It was described by Walter Forster in 1960.

== Life cycle ==
The larvae of Erivan Anomalous Blue feed on Astragalus species, although the particular species is still not known. The flight period is from mid-June till mid-July.

== Habitat ==
This species inhabits calcareous grasslands in Armenia at the elevation from 1,200 to 2,200m above sea level.

== Conservation ==
This species has not been evaluated for IUCN Red List and for European Red List of Butterflies. At the national level it is included in Armenian Red Book of Animals, as Endangered (B1a+B2a).
