= Polyommatus altivagans =

Scientific classification
- Kingdom: Animalia
- Phylum: Arthropoda
- Class: Insecta
- Order: Lepidoptera
- Family: Lycaenidae
- Genus: Polyommatus
- Species: P. altivagans

Binomial name
- Polyommatus altivagans (Forster, 1956)

Synonyms
- Agrodiaetus altivagans Forster, 1956

Species of butterfly

Polyommatus altivagans is a butterfly in the family Lycaenidae. It was described by Walter Forster in 1956. It is found in Asia Minor, the eastern Caucasus and Transcaucasia.
