= Pseudochazara williamsi =

Nevada grayling

Conservation status
- Least Concern (IUCN 3.1)

Scientific classification
- Kingdom: Animalia
- Phylum: Arthropoda
- Class: Insecta
- Order: Lepidoptera
- Family: Nymphalidae
- Genus: Pseudochazara
- Species: P. williamsi

Binomial name
- Pseudochazara williamsi Romei, 1927

Synonyms
- Pseudochazara hippolyte williamsi (Romei, 1927)

Species of butterfly

Pseudochazara williamsi (Romei, 1927), the nevada grayling, is a species of butterfly in the family Nymphalidae. It is confined to southern Spain (endemic).

== Flight period ==
The species is univoltine and is on wing from mid-June to early August.

== Food plants ==
Larvae feed on grasses.

== Taxonomy ==
Four taxa of Pseudochazara williamsi (endemism from SE. Iberian Peninsula, Spain) were described as subspecies of Pseudochazara hippolyte (Esper, 1784) (an Asian taxon). Some authors consider them only as ecotypes (ecological forms, local forms), see Gil-T. (2017): isolated populations adapted to a particular set of environmental conditions. In Pseudochazara the drawings of underside of the hind wings is very variable, result of an important phenotypic plasticity, due to its ability to change the phenotype in order to obtain a certain degree of mimetism required for camouflage with the terrain of its environment to mimic the environment where it lives. These ecological forms have no taxonomic rank in modern biological classification, therefore without taxonomical or nomenclatural significance, since there is no solid foundations to justify their subspecific validity. Note: the old names of the taxa described, of very questionable validity, are indicated in brackets. The updated distribution and a morphological study (taxonomy) of P. williamsi can be seen in Gil-T. (2016, 2017).

Subspecies	Distribution
Ecological form 1 (= "williamsi")	Sierra Nevada: S. Granada and S. Almería provinces; Sierra de Baza: E. Granada province; Sierra de los Filabres: W. Almería provinces. S. Spain.
Ecological form 2 (= "aislada")	Sierra de María and Sierra de Orce: NE. Almeria province, SE. Spain.
Ecologicall form 3 (= "augustini")	Sierra de Gádor: S. Almeria province, S. Spain.
Ecological form 4 (= "reverchoni")	Sierra de Guillimona and Sierra Seca: NE. Granada province; Revolcadores: W. Murcia province. SE. Spain.
