= Pseudochazara beroe =

Scientific classification
- Domain: Eukaryota
- Kingdom: Animalia
- Phylum: Arthropoda
- Class: Insecta
- Order: Lepidoptera
- Family: Nymphalidae
- Genus: Pseudochazara
- Species: P. beroe

Binomial name
- Pseudochazara beroe (Herrich-Schaffer, [1844])

Synonyms
- Pseudochazara altivolans Gross, 1978

Species of butterfly

Pseudochazara beroe is a species of butterfly in the family Nymphalidae. It is found from western Turkey across southern Transcaucasia and the Elburz Mountains to Kopet-Dagh.

== Description in Seitz ==
S. beroe Frr. (43 g). Recalling pelopea in pattern, but the ground-colour much lighter, being glossy dust-grey, the distal band dull wax-yellow, with 2 rather large dark ocelli on the forewing. Costal margin and fringes of a whitish silky gloss. Hindwing beneath yellowish grey- brown, with a dirty white band beyond the middle. — In ab. rhena H.-Schiff. the band is more or less tinged with reddish yellow distally, and in ab. aurantiaca Stgr. (43 g, 44 a) the bands are entirely orange-yellow. — In Asia Minor, occurring more singly, from June till August.

== Flight period ==
The species is univoltine and on wing from mid-June to August.

== Food plants ==
Larvae feed on grasses.

== Subspecies ==
- Pseudochazara beroe beroe
- Pseudochazara aurantiaca (Staudinger, 1871) (Kopet-Dagh)
- Pseudochazara rhena (Herrich-Schäffer, 1852) (Armenian Highland)
