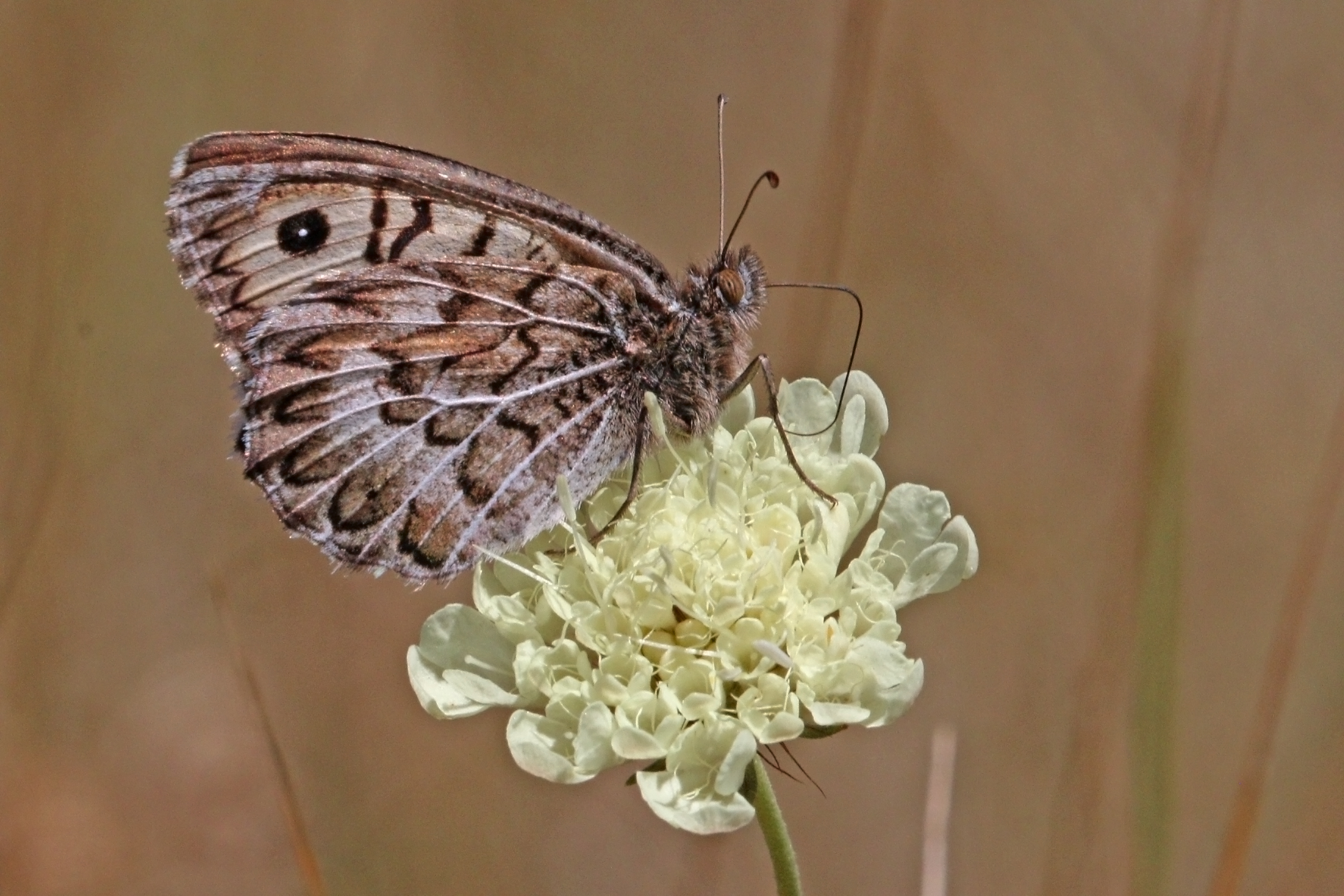
- Galichica National Park; North Macedonia

Scientific classification
- Domain: Eukaryota
- Kingdom: Animalia
- Phylum: Arthropoda
- Class: Insecta
- Order: Lepidoptera
- Family: Nymphalidae
- Genus: Pseudochazara
- Species: P. geyeri

Binomial name
- Pseudochazara geyeri (Herrich-Schaffer, 1846)

Synonyms
- Satyrus geyeri Herrich-Schäffer, [1846]; Satyrus geyeri Herrich-Schäffer, [1851]

= Pseudochazara geyeri =

Species of butterfly

Pseudochazara geyeri, the Grey Asian grayling is a species of butterfly in the family Nymphalidae. It is confined to Albania, Greece, North Macedonia, eastern Turkey and south-western Transcaucasia.

== Description in Seitz ==
S. geyeri H.-Schiff. (43c). Recalling Hipparchia autonoe, but the upperside is not so dark; the ground-colour is yellowish grey, the markings of the underside distinctly shining through and the dark veins being quite plain. Underside of forewing light, feebly shaded with yellowish; the hindwing beneath coarsely marmorated and white-veined, bearing beyond the middle a light band which is interrupted above and below the apex of the cell. — On the east coast of the Black Sea, in Asia Minor, Armenia and Kurdistan, in July and August, very abundant.

== Flight period ==
The species is univoltine and on wing from late June to September.

== Food plants ==
Larvae feed on grasses.

== Subspecies ==
- Pseudochazara geyeri geyeri
- Pseudochazara geyeri karsicola Gross, 1978 (Armenian Highland)
- Pseudochazara geyeri occidentalis (Rebel & Zerny, 1931) (Albania)
