= Pseudochazara orestes =

Dils' grayling

Conservation status
- Vulnerable (IUCN 3.1)

Scientific classification
- Kingdom: Animalia
- Phylum: Arthropoda
- Class: Insecta
- Order: Lepidoptera
- Family: Nymphalidae
- Genus: Pseudochazara
- Species: P. orestes

Binomial name
- Pseudochazara orestes de Prins and Van der Poorten, 1981

Species of butterfly

Pseudochazara orestes, the Dils' grayling, is a species of butterfly in the family Nymphalidae. It is confined to Phalakron massif, Menikion mountains, Mount Orvilos – Greece; South Pirin mountains, precisely on the southern slopes of the Gradishte Hill in south-western Bulgaria.

== Flight period ==
The species is univoltine and is on wing from mid-June to late July.

== Food plants ==
Larvae feed on grasses.
