= Pseudochazara mamurra =

Buff Asian grayling

Scientific classification
- Domain: Eukaryota
- Kingdom: Animalia
- Phylum: Arthropoda
- Class: Insecta
- Order: Lepidoptera
- Family: Nymphalidae
- Genus: Pseudochazara
- Species: P. mamurra

Binomial name
- Pseudochazara mamurra (Herrich-Schäffer 1852)

Synonyms
- Satyrus mamurra Herrich-Schäffer, [1846]; Pseudochazara amymone Brown, 1976

Species of butterfly

Pseudochazara mamurra, the buff Asian grayling, is a species of butterfly in the family Nymphalidae. It is confined to Albania, Greece, and Turkey. The habitat consists of slopes in steep river valleys.

It is a very variable species.

== Flight period ==
The species is univoltine and is on wing from June to August.

== Food plants ==
Larvae feed on grasses.

== Subspecies ==
- Pseudochazara mamurra mamurra (Turkey)
- Pseudochazara mamurra amymone Brown, 1976 - Brown's grayling (Greece and Albania)
- Pseudochazara mamurra birgit Gross, 1978 (Turkey)

Pseudochazara mamurra amymone is alternatively treated as a full species.

== Gallery ==
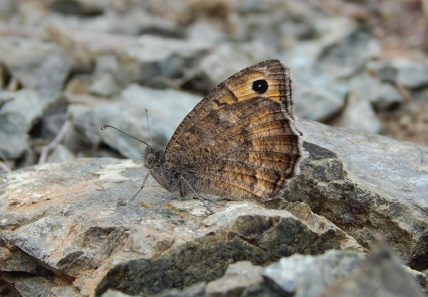
Pseudochazara mamurra amymone

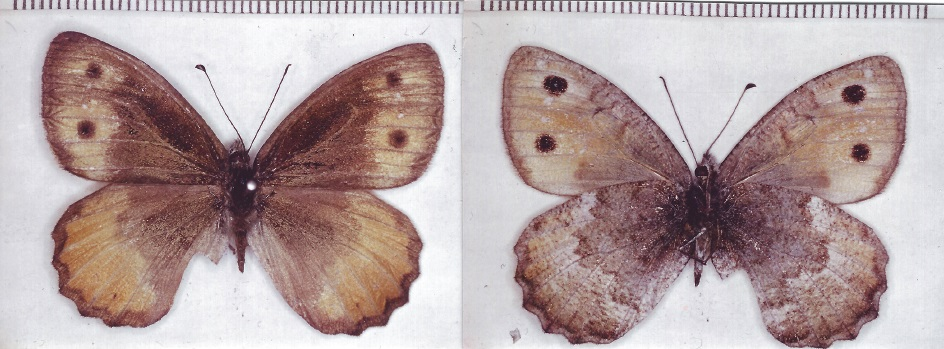
Pseudochazara mamurra amymone upperside and underside

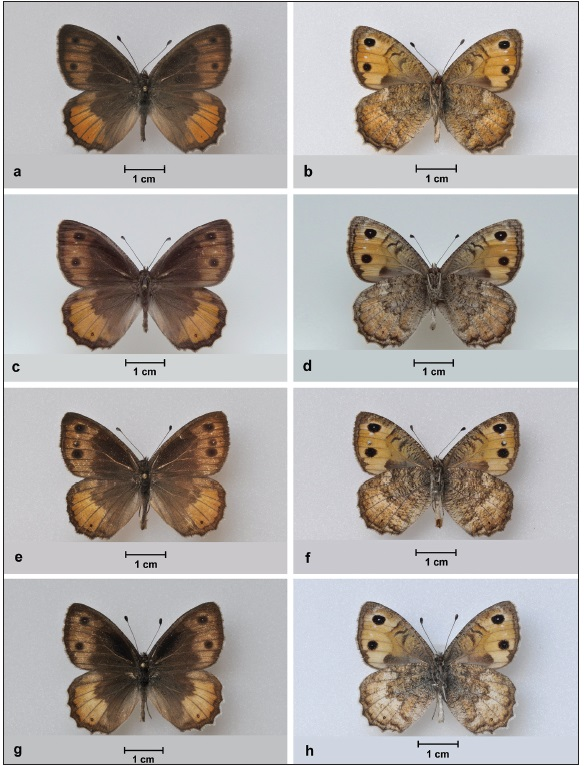
Pseudochazara mamurra amymone variation

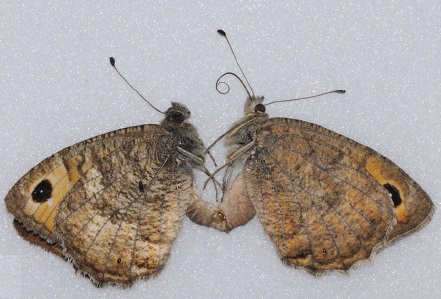
Pseudochazara mamurra amymone mating

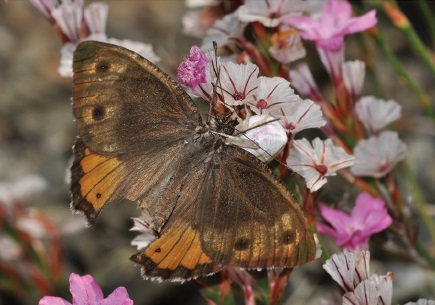
Pseudochazara mamurra amymone caught by a crab spider
