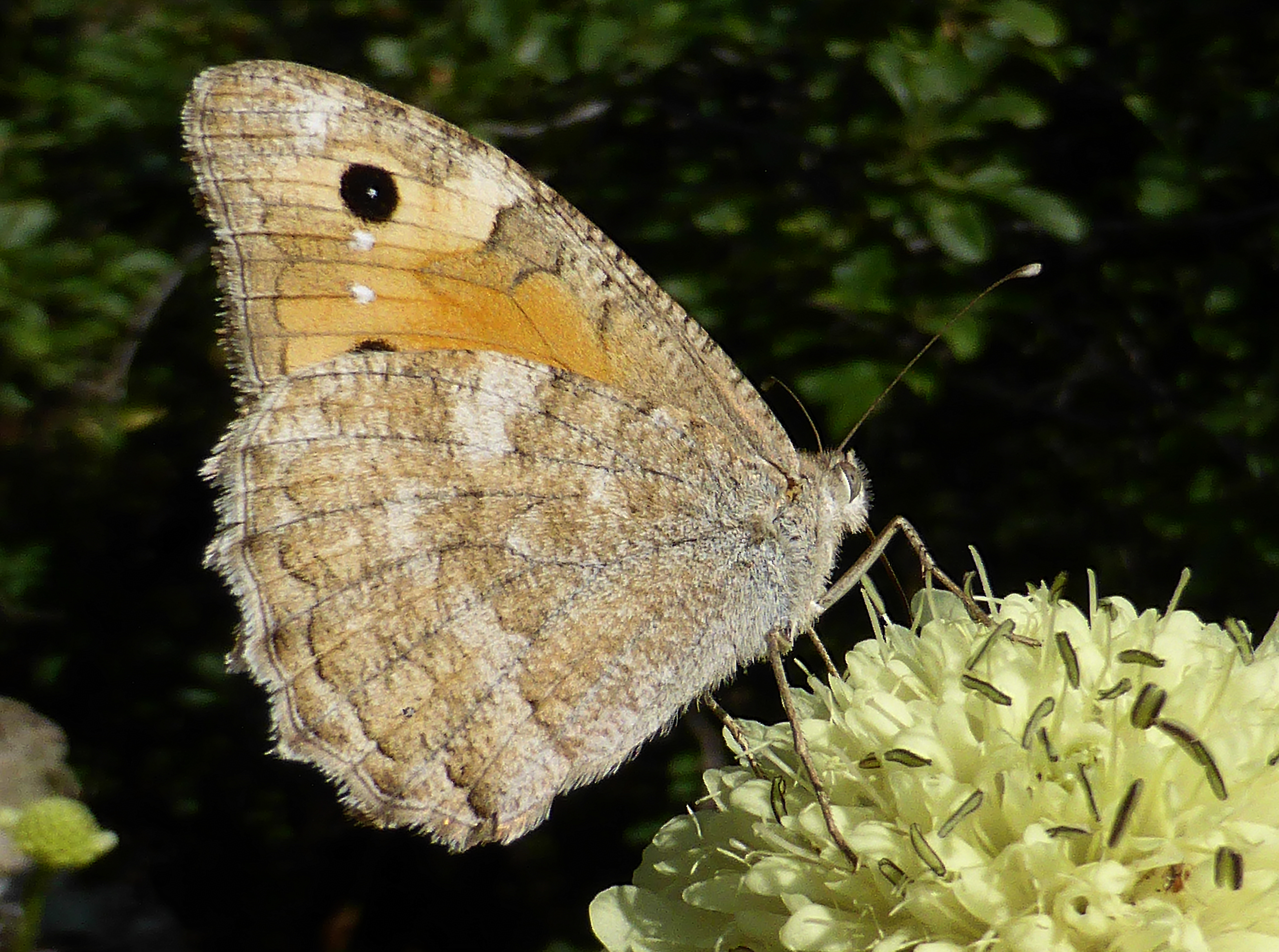

Scientific classification
- Kingdom: Animalia
- Phylum: Arthropoda
- Class: Insecta
- Order: Lepidoptera
- Family: Nymphalidae
- Genus: Pseudochazara
- Species: P. thelephassa

Binomial name
- Pseudochazara thelephassa (Geyer, [1827])

Synonyms
- Eumenis thelephassa Geyer, [1827]

= Pseudochazara thelephassa =

Species of butterfly

Pseudochazara thelephassa, the Baluchi rockbrown, is a species of butterfly in the family Nymphalidae. It is found in Turkey (Adana, Adıyaman, Bingöl, Diyarbakır, Elazığ, Gaziantep, Hakkari, Hatay, İzmir, Kars, Malatya, Kahramanmaraş, Mardin, Nevşehir, Siirt, Tunceli, Urfa, Şırnak, Iğdır) to Asia Minor across Iran, Iraq, Transcaucasia and Kopet-Dagh to Afghanistan and Pakistan.

== Flight period ==
The species is univoltine and is on wing from April to July.

== Food plants ==
Larvae feed on grasses.
