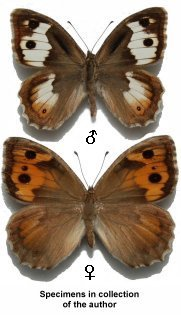

Scientific classification
- Domain: Eukaryota
- Kingdom: Animalia
- Phylum: Arthropoda
- Class: Insecta
- Order: Lepidoptera
- Family: Nymphalidae
- Genus: Pseudochazara
- Species: P. anthelea

Binomial name
- Pseudochazara anthelea (Hübner, 1825)

= Pseudochazara anthelea =

Species of butterfly

Pseudochazara anthelea is a species of butterfly in the family Nymphalidae. It is found in Albania, the Republic of Macedonia, Bulgaria, Greece, Turkey and northern Iraq. The males can be easily distinguished from the females by the white base and they are found in dry, stony slopes and gullies, usually on limestone.

== Subspecies ==
There is one subspecies of Pseudochazara anthelea:

- Pseudochazara anthelea amalthea Frivaldsky 1845

This subspecies is localised in Crete, Greece and in the Struma valley of Bulgaria.

== Flight period ==
This species is univoltine, and is on wing from late May to early July depending on altitude and locality.

== Food plants ==
Larvae have been reared on grasses.

== Description in Seitz ==
S. anthelea Hbn. ( = telephassa Dup.) (43 g). male with a white band which is only distally shaded with reddish yellow, and with a black smear-like brand in the cell; the hindwing beneath marmorated with grey, bearing on the disc an irregular, band-like, white spot. The female has a bright ochre-yellow distal band, which extends on the forewing as a long and broad smear over the disc into the brown-grey ground-colour to near the base. These forms are the commoner ones. There occur, however, also males with the bands strongly washed with yellow; this is ab. syriaca Ruhl; in Asia Minor, especially abundant in the Taurus, above Adana; also in Lydia and Kurdistan. — The European form, amalthea Friv: (43 g), has similar males as the form from Asia Minor, but entirely different females; these are like the males, possessing on the forewing a white macular band, with very large ocelli, the hindwing usually bearing in the middle a white smear; south-eastern districts of the Balcan Peninsula. — The butterflies are extremely abundant in their flight places, namely barren hills and sterile detritus, and fly in April and May, at higher altitudes not before the end of May.

== Sources ==
- Species info
- "Pseudochazara de Lesse, 1951" at Markku Savela's Lepidoptera and Some Other Life Forms
- Butterflies of Europe, Tom Tolman, 1997, Princeton University Press
