= Pseudochazara pelopea =

Scientific classification
- Domain: Eukaryota
- Kingdom: Animalia
- Phylum: Arthropoda
- Class: Insecta
- Order: Lepidoptera
- Family: Nymphalidae
- Genus: Pseudochazara
- Species: P. pelopea

Binomial name
- Pseudochazara pelopea (Klug, 1832)

Synonyms
- Hipparchia pelopea Klug, 1832

Species of butterfly

Pseudochazara pelopea is a species of butterfly in the family Nymphalidae. It is confined to Lebanon, Turkey, the Caucasus, Syria, Turkmenistan and Kopet-Dagh.

== Flight period ==
The species is univoltine and is on wing from June to August.

== Food plants ==
Larvae feed on grasses.

== Subspecies ==
- Pseudochazara pelopea pelopea
- Pseudochazara pelopea persica (Christoph, 1877) the Caucasus Major and Minor, the Armenian Highland and Talysh; Adana, Adıyaman, Ağrı, Bingöl, Bitlis, Diyarbakır, Elazığ, Erzurum, Gaziantep, Gümüşhane, Hakkari, Kars, Kayseri, Malatya, Maraş, Mardin, Muş, Rize, Siirt, Sivas, Tunceli, Urfa, Van, Şırnak, Iğdır – Turkey
- Pseudochazara pelopea tekkensis (Heyne, [1895]) Kopet Dagh - Turkmenistan/Iran border
