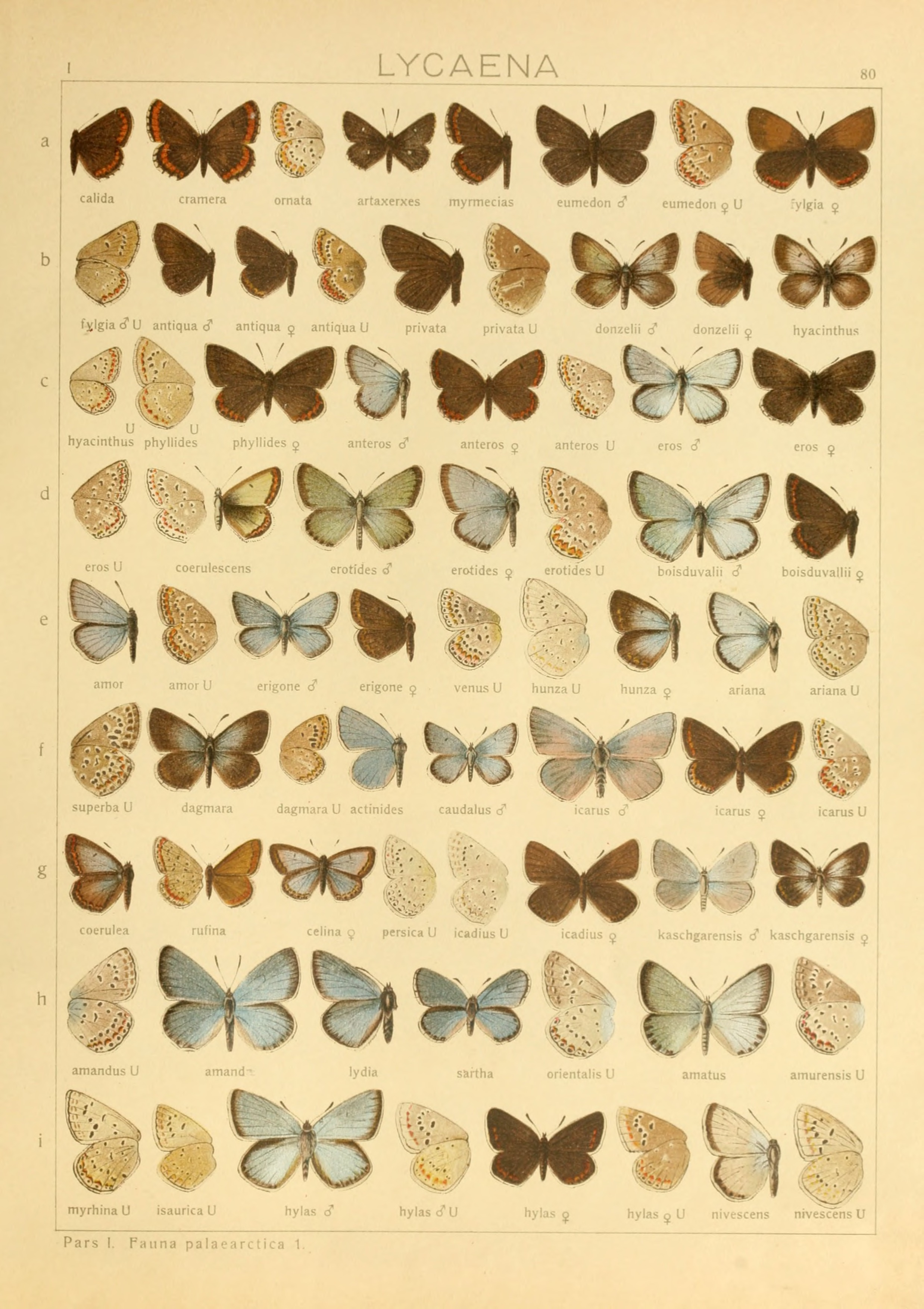
- Seitz plate 80f

Scientific classification
- Kingdom: Animalia
- Phylum: Arthropoda
- Class: Insecta
- Order: Lepidoptera
- Family: Lycaenidae
- Genus: Polyommatus
- Species: P. dagmara

Binomial name
- Polyommatus dagmara (Grum-Grshimailo,1888)

= Polyommatus dagmara =

Species of butterfly

Polyommatus dagmara is a butterfly in the family Lycaenidae. It was described by Grigory Grum-Grshimailo in 1888. It is found in Ghissar, Darvaz and Alai (Gissaro–Alai open woodlands).

L. dagmara Gr.-Grsh. (80 f). The male strongly recalls Polyommatus magnifica, but is considerably smaller; the blue colour is restricted to the basal half of both wings, and is not extended along the costa to the apex as in superba. The female is paler, only the hindwing shows distinct russet-yellow marginal lunules, of which there are also traces in the male. The ocelli of the underside are much less enlarged and prominent in both sexes, those of the hindwing being especially very much smaller and delicate.—In Turkestan, Bokhara, in June, at 5–10,000 ft. Asia.
