= Polyommatus sagratrox =

Scientific classification
- Kingdom: Animalia
- Phylum: Arthropoda
- Class: Insecta
- Order: Lepidoptera
- Family: Lycaenidae
- Genus: Polyommatus
- Subgenus: Plebicula
- Species: P. sagratrox

Binomial name
- Polyommatus sagratrox (Aistleitner, 1986)

Species of butterfly

Polyommatus (Plebicula) sagratrox, the Sierra de la Sagra blue, is a species of butterfly in the family Lycaenidae. It is endemic to Spain in the south-east of the Iberian Peninsula.

Adults are on wing from July (normally) to August. The host plant for the larvae is Anthyllis vulneraria microcephala, an endemic plant from the north-east Andalusia region of south-eastern Spain.

== Synonyms ==
- Plebicula sagratrox Aistleitner, 1986
- Polyommatus golgus sagratrox (Aistleitner, 1986)
- Plebicula golgus sagratrox (Aistleitner, 1986)

== Ecology and distribution ==
- Type locality: Sierra de la Sagra in the north-east of the Province of Granada, Spain.
- Distribution (see Gil-T., 2013): only in four separated and small colonies: Sierra de la Sagra, Sierra de Guillimona and Sierra Seca in the north-eastern Granada province; and Sierra de la Cabrilla in north-eastern Jaén province.
- Its distribution is the most reduced of all Papilionoidea endemic species of Spain: the total occupied area by the four colonies is 0.82 km^{2}.
- Altitude of its biotopes: 1900–2300 m (note: altitude very different from Polyommatus golgus: 2500–3200 m).
- Host plant: Anthyllis vulneraria microcephala, an endemic plant from the north-east Andalusia Region, SE. Spain.

== Taxonomy ==
- Tolman (1994) considers to Polyommatus sagratrox as a subspecies of Polyommatus golgus basing on some questionable and unjustified arguments (see discussion in Gil-T. & Ibáñez (2009)).
- P. golgus and P. sagratrox show an ecology (altitude of their biotopes, larval host plants, soil substrate, etc.), morphology and ethology very differentiated (see Gil-T (2003, 2013) and Gil-T. & Ibáñez (2009)).
