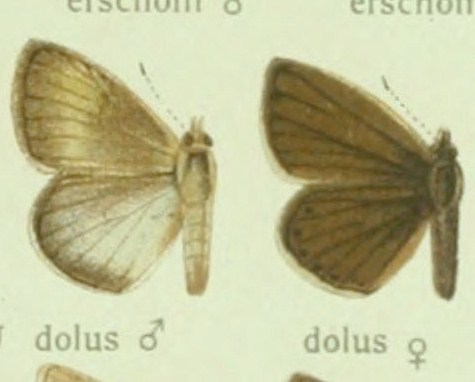
- Male and female

Scientific classification
- Kingdom: Animalia
- Phylum: Arthropoda
- Clade: Pancrustacea
- Class: Insecta
- Order: Lepidoptera
- Family: Lycaenidae
- Genus: Polyommatus
- Species: P. dolus

Binomial name
- Polyommatus dolus Hübner, 1823

= Polyommatus dolus =

Species of butterfly

Polyommatus dolus, the furry blue, is a butterfly of the family Lycaenidae. It is found in Spain (from Huesca to Santander - Burgos), in France (Herault and from the Cevennes to the Maritime Alps) and Italy (Central Italy and Maritime Alps).

It is described in Seitz thus- L. dolus Hbn. (= lefebvrei Godt.) (81 f). male above with a light, silky, grey-blue gloss, nearly as in coridon, but this gloss is restricted to the outer half of the wing, the proximal half being a dirty brown. Female above dark brown with darker veins, resembling almost exactly a male of ripartii on the upperside. Underside rather similar to that of admetus, clearer, with smaller ocelli and without white mesial streak. In South France, and Northern and Central Italy. — ab. vittata Oberth. (81 f) [now P. d. vittata (Oberthür, 1892)] are specimens with a whitish mesial streak on the hindwing beneath; from the Cevennes (Lozere). — menalcas Frr. (= epidolus Frr.) (81 g) is a form from Anterior Asia (or a distinct species?) [now full species Polyommatus menalcas (Freyer, 1837) ] which has a paler underside, smaller ocelli and a very distinct sharply defined mesial streak on the hindwing beneath. In the male the brown colour of the upperside is restricted to the forewing and here concentrated into a dirty brown patch. Turkey and Asia Minor to Turkestan. Larva green when young. later on violet; until June on Onobrychis and Medicago. The butterflies from June till August, locally plentiful, especially flying on fields of Esparcet.

== Biology ==
Habitats are dry acid grassland, dry calcareous grasslands and steppes and sclerophyllous scrub at 600-1800m. The butterfly flies from July to August.

The larvae feed on Onobrychis viciifolia and Medicago species.
