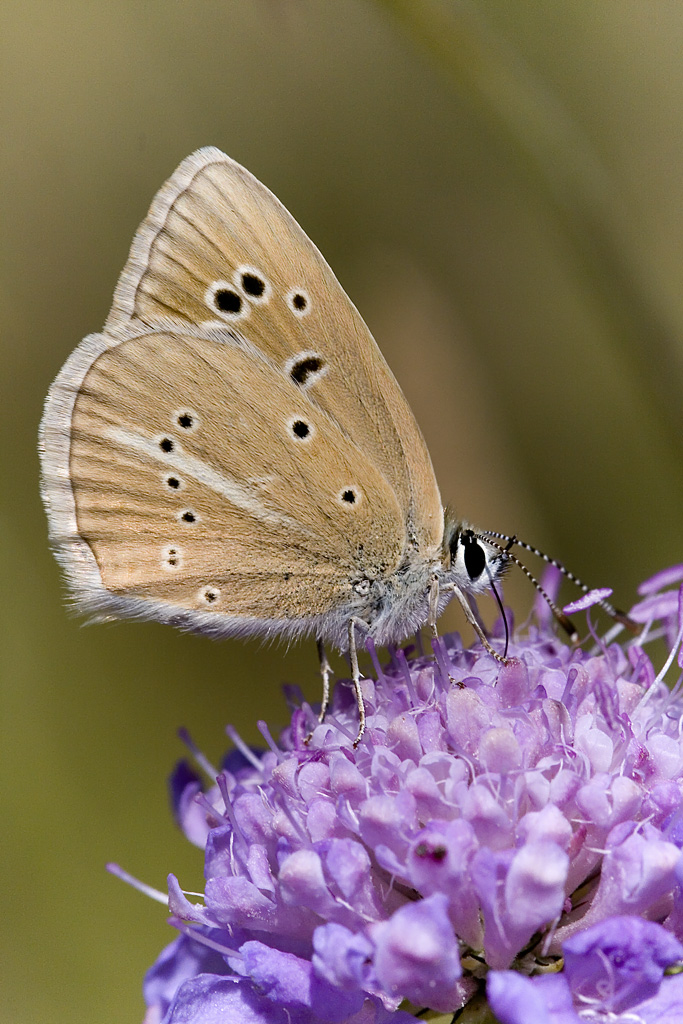

Scientific classification
- Kingdom: Animalia
- Phylum: Arthropoda
- Class: Insecta
- Order: Lepidoptera
- Family: Lycaenidae
- Genus: Polyommatus
- Species: P. fulgens

Binomial name
- Polyommatus fulgens (de Sagarra, 1925)

= Polyommatus fulgens =

Species of butterfly

Polyommatus (Agrodiaetus) fulgens is a species of butterfly in the family Lycaenidae. It is found in the north and north-east of Spain.

The wingspan is about 29 mm. The upper side of the male is very pale blue with an androconial spot and a light brown border, while the upper side of the female is brown. The reverse has an ocher background in the female and lighter in the male, adorned in both cases with black dots outlined in white and a white stripe on the hindwing. Polyommatus fulgens is very similar to Polyommatus dolus Adults are on wing from July to August.

The larvae feed on Onobrychis viciifolia and other Onobrychis species.

== Varieties or forms ==
- Polyommatus fulgens v. fulgens (north-east Iberian Peninsula, Spain)
- Polyommatus fulgens v. ainsae Forster, 1961 (north Iberian Peninsula, Spain)

Both taxa without geographical separation, continuous distribution.

The taxon P. f. ainsae was treated as a full species by some authors, but molecular studies have concluded that it is the same species as the taxon P. f. fulgens.

== Synonyms ==
- Agrodiaetus dolus fulgens de Sagarra, 1925
- Agrodiaetus ainsae Forster, 1961
- Polyommatus fulgens f. pseudovirgilius (Lesse, 1962)
- Agrodiaetus ainsae leonensis Verhulst, 2004
