= Polyommatus nephohiptamenos =

Higgins's anomalous blue

Scientific classification
- Kingdom: Animalia
- Phylum: Arthropoda
- Class: Insecta
- Order: Lepidoptera
- Family: Lycaenidae
- Genus: Polyommatus
- Species: P. nephohiptamenos

Binomial name
- Polyommatus nephohiptamenos (Brown & Coutsis, 1978)
- Location of area of occupancy

Species of butterfly

Polyommatus nephohiptamenos, or Higgins's anomalous blue, is a butterfly of the family Lycaenidae described by J. Brown and John G. Coutsis in 1978. It has an IUCN Red List status of near threatened.

== Description ==
The Higgins's anomalous blue (Polyommatus nephohiptamenos) is in the family Lycaenidae. It was described by Brown and Coutsis in 1978. Polyommatus nephohiptamenos was thought to possibly be a subspecies or form of Polyommatus ripartii, Ripart's anomalous blue. A 2016 paper confirmed that it was a distinct species based on distinct COI mitochondrial DNA barcodes and ecological differentiation. The fringes of the male are whiter than with P. ripartii.

== Habitat ==
P. nephohiptamenos is endemic to Europe, found only in mountains of northern Greece and occasionally of southern Bulgaria. It is found in a small area at higher altitudes of the Phalakron Massif in Greece and Bulgaria. It has a dot-like distribution range. It has been found on Mount Pangeon and Mount Phalakro in Greece, and Mount Orvilos on the border between Greece and Bulgaria, and Mount Alibotush and Kitka Planina in Bulgaria. It is probably limited to less than 10 locations within an area of occupancy under 100 square kilometres (39 sq mi). It is usually found above the tree line, mostly between 1,500 to 2,000 metres (4,900 to 6,600 ft) in calcareous grasslands with many flowers.

== Life cycle ==
P. nephohiptamenos has one generation per year. It feeds on the perennial sainfoin Onobrychis montana ssp. scardica, which is endemic to the Balkans. The caterpillars hibernate while still small, and feed on the new leaves of the sainfoin the next spring. The butterfly flies in mid-July and August. The butterfly may be threatened by intensified grazing, abandonment and wildfires. It has an IUCN Red List status of near threatened.

== Sources ==
- Polyommatus nephohiptamenos, IUCN: International Union for Conservation of Nature and Natural Resources
- Rowlings, Matt, "Polyommatus nephohiptamenos", euroButterflies
- Vishnevskaya, Maria S.; Saifitdinova, Alsu F.; Lukhtanov, Vladimir A. (2016), "Karyosystematics and molecular taxonomy of the anomalous blue butterflies (Lepidoptera, Lycaenidae) from the Balkan Peninsula", Comp. Cytogenet., 10 (5): 1–85, doi:10.3897/CompCytogen.v10i5.10944, PMC 5220643, PMID 28105291
