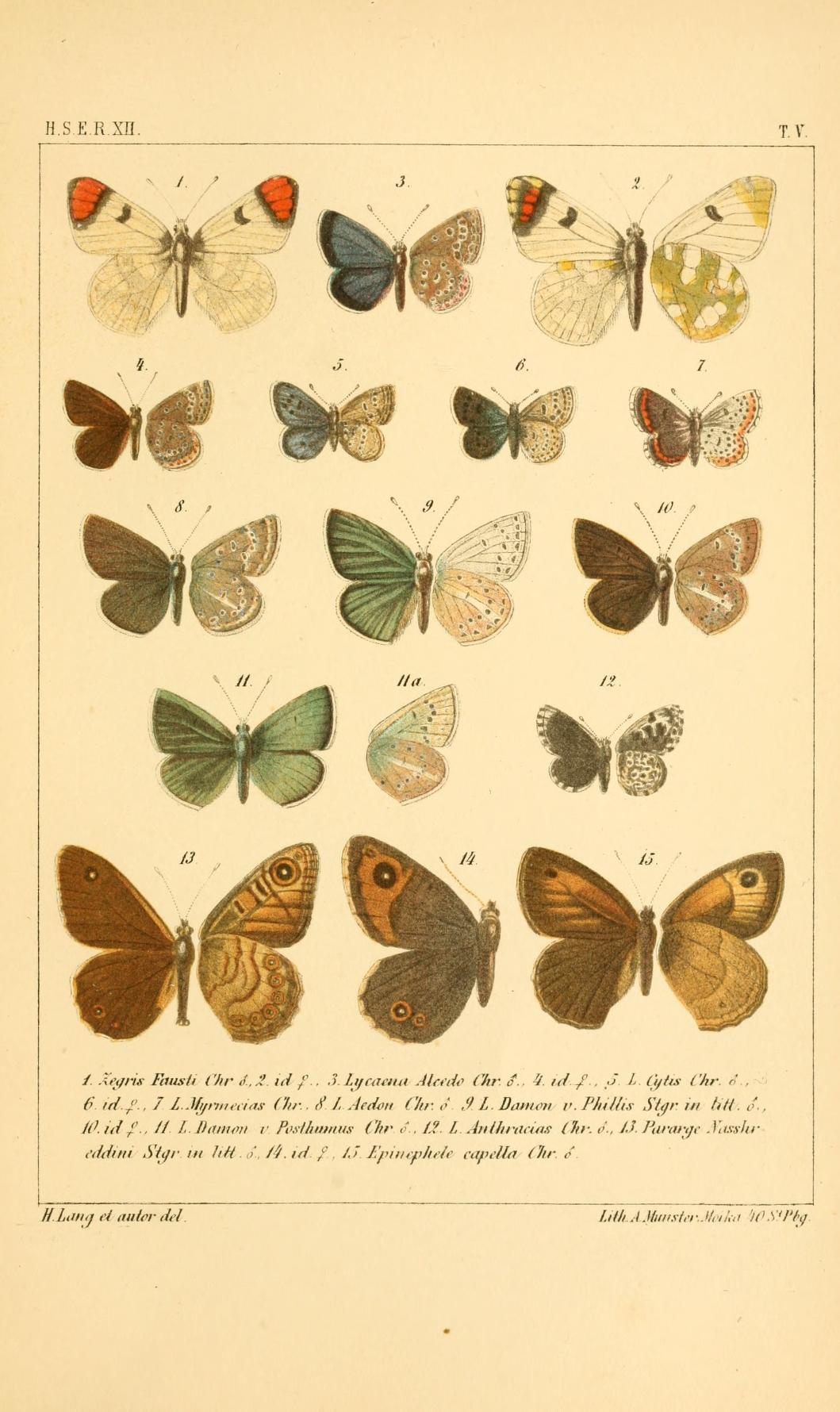
- Male in Horae Societatis Entomologicae Rossicae, figure 8

Scientific classification
- Kingdom: Animalia
- Phylum: Arthropoda
- Class: Insecta
- Order: Lepidoptera
- Family: Lycaenidae
- Genus: Polyommatus
- Species: P. aedon

Binomial name
- Polyommatus aedon (Christoph, 1887)

Synonyms
- Agrodiaetus aedon Christoph, 1887

= Polyommatus aedon =

Species of butterfly

Polyommatus aedon is a butterfly of the family Lycaenidae. It was described by Hugo Theodor Christoph in 1887. It is found in central Anatolia, Kurdistan province of Iran, the Caucasus and Elburz Mountains.
