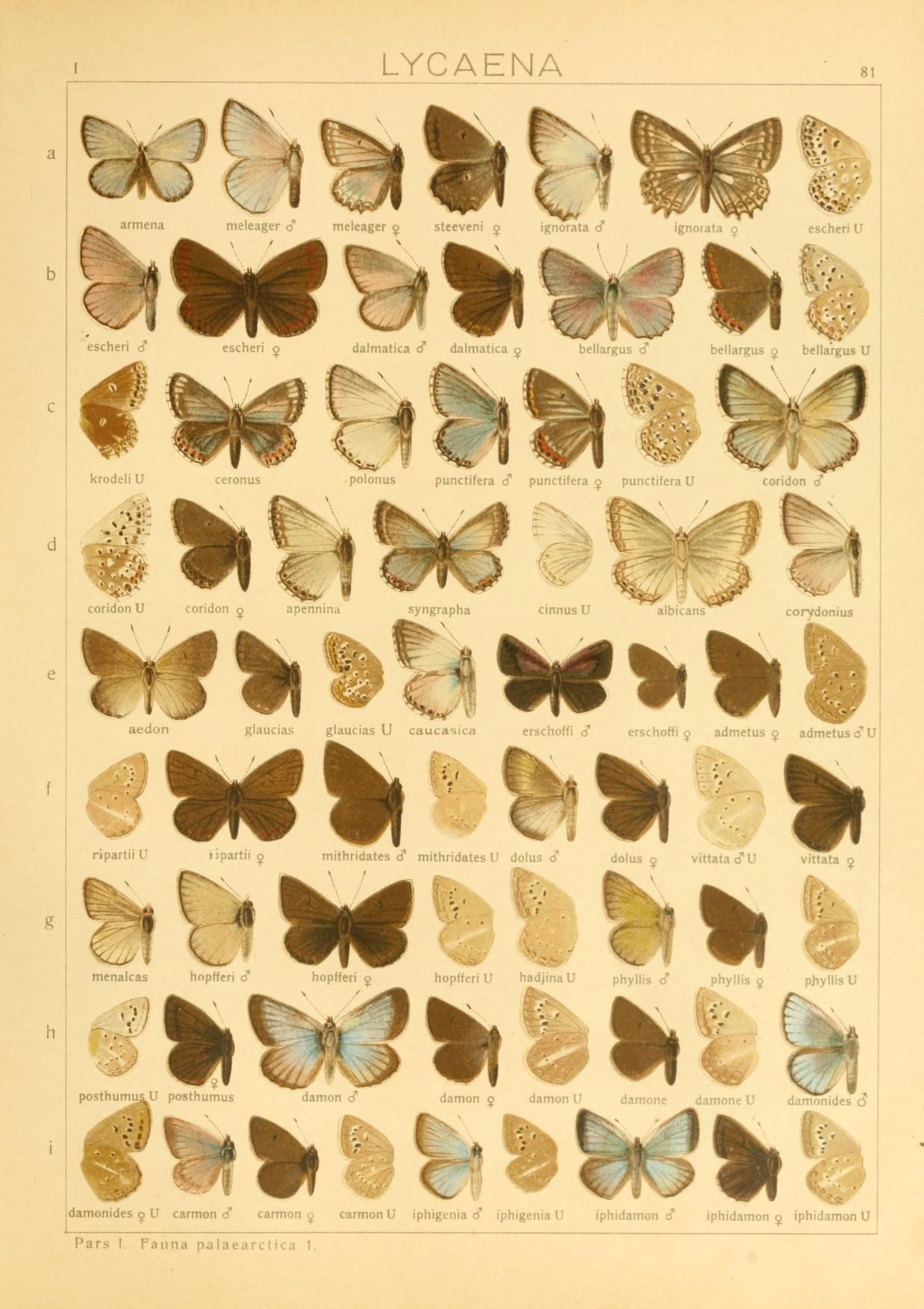
- Polyommatus damone in Seitz 81 h

Scientific classification
- Domain: Eukaryota
- Kingdom: Animalia
- Phylum: Arthropoda
- Class: Insecta
- Order: Lepidoptera
- Family: Lycaenidae
- Genus: Polyommatus
- Species: P. damone

Binomial name
- Polyommatus damone (Eversmann, 1841)

= Polyommatus damone =

Species of butterfly

Polyommatus damone is a Palearctic butterfly in the Lycaenidae family.

== Subspecies ==
- Polyommatus damone altaica (Elwes, 1899) Altai
- Polyommatus damone bogdoolensis Dantchenko & Lukhtanov, 1997 North Mongolia

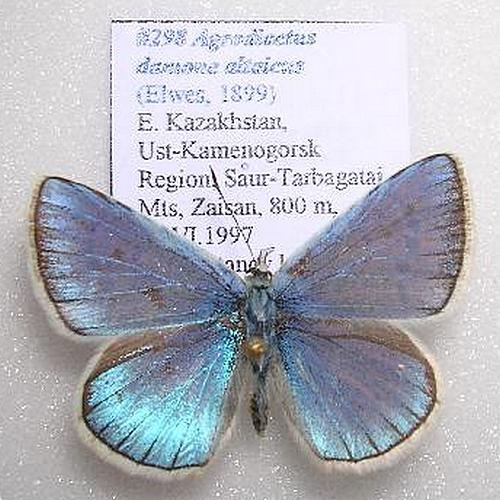
Polyommatus damone altaicus

- Polyommatus damone damone South Urals
- Polyommatus damone irinae Dantchenko, 1997 Lower flow region of Volga River
- Polyommatus damone pljushtchi (Lukhtanov & Budashkin, 1993) Crimea
- Polyommatus damone sibirica (Staudinger, 1899) South Siberia, North Mongolia
- Polyommatus damone tanais (Dantchenko & Pljushtch, 1993) Southeast Europe
- Polyommatus damone walteri Dantchenko & Lukhtanov, 1993 Northwest Mongolia, Tuva

== Description from Seitz ==
L. damone Ev. (81 h). At once distinguished from damon by the quite different tint of the blue in the male: the name-typical form, moreover, has a narrow black border. The white mesial streak of the hindwing beneath is either absent or present, but in the latter case is mostly much less conspicuous, diffuse, obsolescent or shortened. Female above dark brown, usually with obsolescent reddish yellow submarginal spots on the hindwing. In the southern Ural. ab. damocles H.-Schaff. [now full species] is a rare aberration whose male is smaller, very bright sky-blue bearing on the thin black border of the hindwing dark triangles resembling diffuse marginal dots. — damonides Stgr. (81 h, i) [now full species] from Transcaucasia and Persia (e. g. at Shahrud) is larger, darker above and beneath, the ground-colour of the underside being dark chocolate-brown : the white mesial streak, though prominent, is thinner and shorter. — sibirica Stgr. (= altaica Elw. from the Altai, is smaller and has the base of the wings more brightly dusted with blue beneath. — carmon H.- Schaff.[now full species] (=kindermanni Led., alpestris Frr., eurypilus Gerh.) (81 i) is much smaller than all the other forms of damone; the male bright cyaneous blue with broad black border to the forewing. From Asia Minor (Taurus), Armenia and Persia. — transcaspica Stgr. [now full species] is lighter blue above and darker brown beneath: from Turkestan. — In cyanea Stgr.[now full species] the male has nearly the same colour as the male of icarus, with distinctly black veins and thin black border; the costal area is a lighter blue and contrasts with the rest of the wing. Armenia. — xerxesStgr. [cyanea ssp.], from Shahrud in Persia, is still smaller, the underside paler with the mesial streak entirely obsolete or nearly. — iphigenia H.-Schaff. (81 i) [now full species] is again similar to damon, above more greenish blue, with broad black border, the costal and apical areas of the hindwing also being black. The underside is paler and has smaller ocelli. Asia Minor and Persia. — iphidamon Stgr. (81 i) [now full species] is somewhat larger than the preceding form and the dark border is deeper black: from the Taurus, Kurdistan and Persia. — juldusa Stgr. (= iphigenia Alph.) [now full species] (82 a) is more greenish blue above, the black scaling so extends from the black border over the blue ground that the border gradually fades away. From the Tian-shan. According to Alpheraky very local and flying about a low plant with blue flowers. — iphigenides [now full species] (melania Gr.-Grsh. ) 82a Much larger than juldusa above very similar to iphigenia, but both sexes beneath with yellowish red marginal spots on the hindwing. Turkestan. — melania Stgr.[now full species] Upperside of male more green, with very broad border; the underside yellowish grey, with larger ocelli and yellowish red submarginal spots on both wings: from the Pamir. — The butterflies of this species are always local, some races appearing to have a very restricted distribution. They fly in May and June, particularly in desolate stony places where Oxytropis grows, and occur up to 10 000 ft.

== Biology ==
The larva feeds on Onobrychis arenaria, Hedysarum candidum, H. biebersteinii, H. cretaceum, H. grandiflorum, H. argyrophyllum

== Etymology ==
Named in the Classical tradition. Damone is a Greek male name derived from Damon, an Athenian musician and philosopher from the time of Dionysus.

== See also ==
- List of butterflies of Russia
