= Polyommatus zapvadi =

Scientific classification
- Kingdom: Animalia
- Phylum: Arthropoda
- Class: Insecta
- Order: Lepidoptera
- Family: Lycaenidae
- Genus: Polyommatus
- Species: P. zapvadi

Binomial name
- Polyommatus zapvadi (Carbonell, [1993])

Synonyms
- Agrodiaetus zapvadi Carbonell, 1993; Agrodiaetus elbursicus zapvadi Carbonell, 1993

Species of butterfly

Polyommatus zapvadi, the Valley Zap blue, is a butterfly of the family Lycaenidae. It was described by Carbonell in 1993. It is found in Turkey.
