= Polyommatus abdon =

Scientific classification
- Kingdom: Animalia
- Phylum: Arthropoda
- Class: Insecta
- Order: Lepidoptera
- Family: Lycaenidae
- Genus: Polyommatus
- Species: P. abdon

Binomial name
- Polyommatus abdon E. & U. Aistleitner, 1994

Species of butterfly

Polyommatus abdon is a butterfly of the family Lycaenidae. It was described by Eyjolf Aistleitner and Ulrich Aistleitner in 1994. It is found in Spain.
