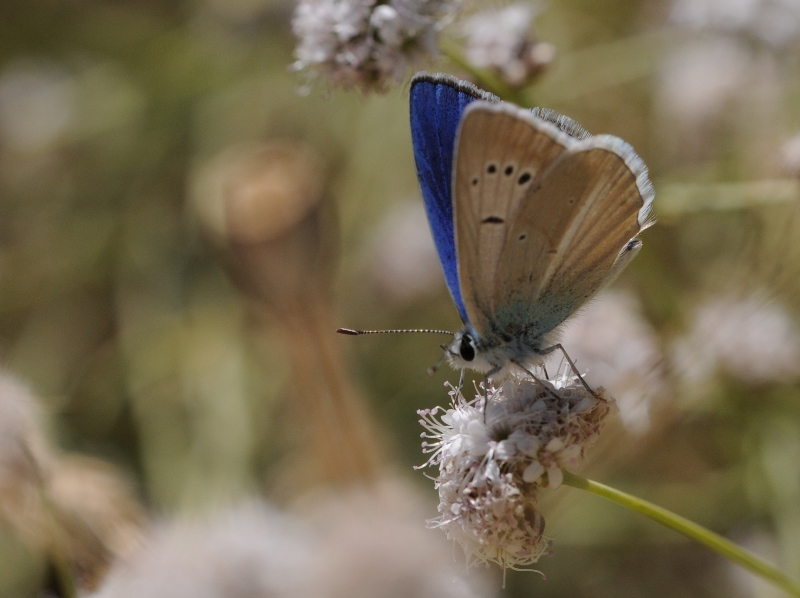
- Male

Scientific classification
- Kingdom: Animalia
- Phylum: Arthropoda
- Class: Insecta
- Order: Lepidoptera
- Family: Lycaenidae
- Genus: Polyommatus
- Species: P. actis

Binomial name
- Polyommatus actis (Herrich-Schäffer, 1851)

Synonyms
- Lycaena actis Herrich-Schäffer, [1851]

= Polyommatus actis =

Species of butterfly

Polyommatus actis is a butterfly of the family Lycaenidae. It was described by Gottlieb August Wilhelm Herrich-Schäffer in 1851. It is found in Asia Minor.
