= Polyommatus baltazardi =

Scientific classification
- Kingdom: Animalia
- Phylum: Arthropoda
- Class: Insecta
- Order: Lepidoptera
- Family: Lycaenidae
- Genus: Polyommatus
- Species: P. baltazardi

Binomial name
- Polyommatus baltazardi (de Lesse, 1963)

Synonyms
- Agrodiaetus baltazardi de Lesse, 1963

Species of butterfly

Polyommatus baltazardi is a butterfly in the family Lycaenidae. It was described by de Hubert de Lesse in 1963. It is found in the Elburz Mountains.
