= Polyommatus attalaensis =

Scientific classification
- Kingdom: Animalia
- Phylum: Arthropoda
- Class: Insecta
- Order: Lepidoptera
- Family: Lycaenidae
- Genus: Polyommatus
- Species: P. attalaensis

Binomial name
- Polyommatus attalaensis (Carbonell et al., 2004)

Synonyms
- Polyommatus (Agrodiaetus) schuriani attalaensis Carbonell, Borie & Prins, 2004

Species of butterfly

Polyommatus attalaensis is a butterfly in the family Lycaenidae. It was described by Frédéric Carbonell et al. in 2004. It is found in Turkey. It was described as a subspecies of Polyommatus schuriani.
