= Polyommatus dama =

Conservation status
- Endangered (IUCN 2.3)(Global)

- Critically endangered, possibly extinct (IUCN 3.1) (Mediterranean)

Scientific classification
- Kingdom: Animalia
- Phylum: Arthropoda
- Class: Insecta
- Order: Lepidoptera
- Family: Lycaenidae
- Genus: Polyommatus
- Species: P. dama

Binomial name
- Polyommatus dama (Staudinger, 1892)

Species of butterfly

Polyommatus dama is a species of butterfly in the family Lycaenidae. It is endemic to Turkey. Its natural habitat is temperate shrubland. It is threatened by habitat loss.
