= Polyommatus actinides =

Scientific classification
- Kingdom: Animalia
- Phylum: Arthropoda
- Class: Insecta
- Order: Lepidoptera
- Family: Lycaenidae
- Genus: Polyommatus
- Species: P. actinides

Binomial name
- Polyommatus actinides (Staudinger, 1886)

Synonyms
- Lycaena actinides Staudinger, 1886; Agrodiaetus actinides; Agrodiaetus praeactinides Forster, 1960; Polyommatus praeactinides

Species of butterfly

Polyommatus actinides is a butterfly of the family Lycaenidae. It was described by Otto Staudinger in 1886. It is found in central Asia.

The larvae feed on Onobrychis species.

== Subspecies ==
- Polyommatus actinides actinides (Zaalaisky Mountains)
- Polyommatus actinides praeactinides (Forster, 1960) (western Tian-Shan)
- Polyommatus actinides weidenhofferi Eckweiler, 1997 (Kirhgizsky Mountains)
