= Polyommatus arasbarani =

Scientific classification
- Kingdom: Animalia
- Phylum: Arthropoda
- Class: Insecta
- Order: Lepidoptera
- Family: Lycaenidae
- Genus: Polyommatus
- Species: P. arasbarani

Binomial name
- Polyommatus arasbarani (Carbonell & Naderi, 2000)

Synonyms
- Agrodiaetus arasbarani Carbonell & Naderi, 2000

Species of butterfly

Polyommatus arasbarani, the Arasbaran anomalous blue, is a butterfly of the family Lycaenidae. It was described by Carbonell & Naderi in 2000. It is endemic of southern slope of the Meghri Mountains in Armenia and nearby Arasbaran Mountains in northern Iran. Armenia is inhabited by subspecies P. a. neglecta (which was initially described as a species, Agrodiaetus neglectus). It inhabits forests alternated with dry steppe-like areas at elevations of 1700–2000 m above sea level. The species is included in the Red Book of Animals of the Republic of Armenia as endangered EN B1a+B2a, although in the book it is still called with the invalid name - Agrodiaetus neglectus.

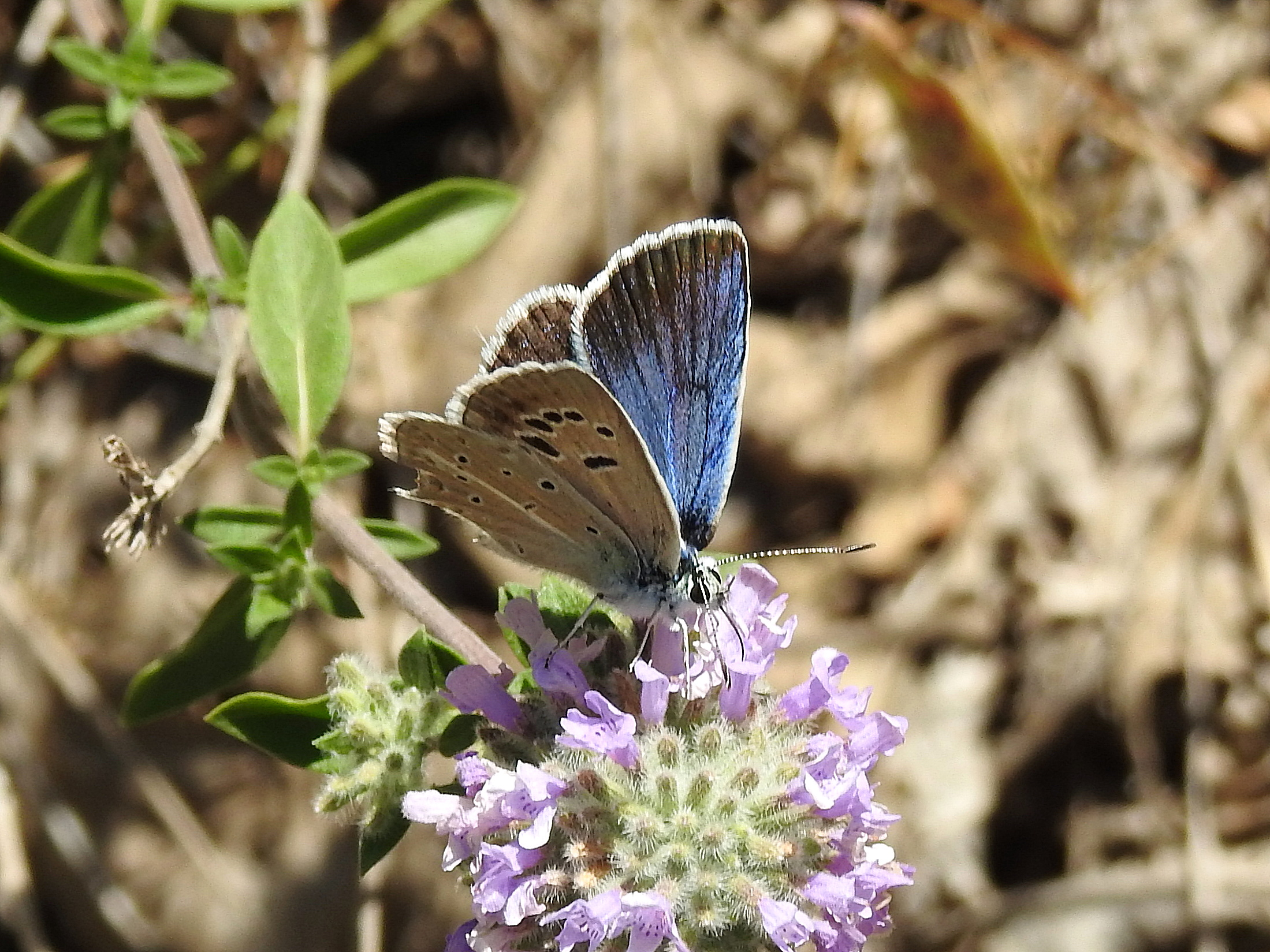
Polyommatus arasbarani neglectus, Armenia

== Subspecies ==
- Polyommatus arasbarani arasbarani (northern Iran)
- Polyommatus arasbarani neglecta Dantchenko, 2000 (southern Armenia)
