= Polyommatus aloisi =

Scientific classification
- Kingdom: Animalia
- Phylum: Arthropoda
- Class: Insecta
- Order: Lepidoptera
- Family: Lycaenidae
- Genus: Polyommatus
- Species: P. aloisi

Binomial name
- Polyommatus aloisi Bálint, 1988

Species of butterfly

Polyommatus aloisi is a butterfly in the family Lycaenidae. It was described by Zsolt Bálint in 1988. It is found in southern Mongolia. The appearance of the insect is brown with dots.
