= Polyommatus dux =

Scientific classification
- Kingdom: Animalia
- Phylum: Arthropoda
- Clade: Pancrustacea
- Class: Insecta
- Order: Lepidoptera
- Family: Lycaenidae
- Genus: Polyommatus
- Species: P. dux

Binomial name
- Polyommatus dux Riley, 1926
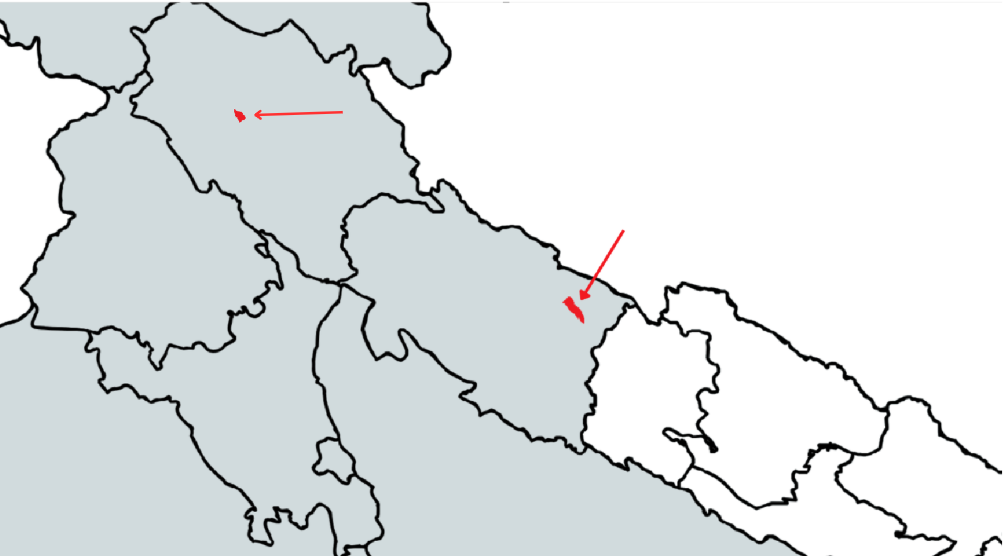

Synonyms
- Polyommatus eros dux Evans, 1932

Species of butterfly

Polyommatus dux, also known as the Kumaon meadow blue, is a butterfly in the family Lycaenidae. It is found in Uttarakhand and Himachal Pradesh. It was described by Norman Denbigh Riley in 1926.

== Description ==
=== Male ===
The upperside is bluish in color with margins having a thread-like black line. The forewings are somewhat greyish, especially near the tornus. The hindwings are narrowly black about apex.

The underside forewing is greyish with a marginal line and a large irregular spot at the cell-end. There is also a series of 6 white spots which are dark-pupiled. The hindwing is brassy green, and the margin is tinged with ochreous and has a greyish colour similar to the forewing.

=== Female ===
The upperside is considerably different from that of the male, it is blackish and has basal blue scaling. The forewing and hindwing are similar to the male.

The underside forewing is differentiated from the male by being much darker brown, having less prominent discal spots and having less prominent veins. The hindwing is more brassy green than the male. The submarginal spots are obsolete in the male and red in the female.

The wingspan of this species is 15 millimeters (0.6 inches) for males and 14 millimeters (0.55 inches) for females.

== Subspecies ==
- Polyommatus dux dux Riley, 1926 - Uttarakhand
- Polyommatus dux fraterluci Bálint, 1995 - Himachal Pradesh

The subspecies fraterluci is separated from the nominate by a less pointed apex and less wider forewing shape.

== Distribution ==
The nominate is only known from a very restricted range in north Kumaon. Its distribution extends roughly from the village of Milam to Rilkot. 22 male and female specimens were collected from Milam and Burphu in 1924 by H. G. Champion and they are now kept in the British Museum.

The subspecies fraterluci is only known from Kullu in Himachal Pradesh.

A record of this species from 2011 in Sikkim was published, but it is considered doubtful as insufficient evidence has been provided for the identification of the species.

== Food plants ==
This species has been recorded nectaring on Malva pusilla.
