= Polyommatus afghanistana =

Scientific classification
- Kingdom: Animalia
- Phylum: Arthropoda
- Class: Insecta
- Order: Lepidoptera
- Family: Lycaenidae
- Genus: Polyommatus
- Species: P. afghanistana

Binomial name
- Polyommatus afghanistana (Forster, 1972)

Synonyms
- Agrodiaetus afghanistana Forster, 1972

Species of butterfly

Polyommatus afghanistana is a butterfly of the family Lycaenidae. It was described by Walter Forster in 1972. It is found in Afghanistan.
