= Polyommatus avinovi =

Scientific classification
- Kingdom: Animalia
- Phylum: Arthropoda
- Class: Insecta
- Order: Lepidoptera
- Family: Lycaenidae
- Genus: Polyommatus
- Species: P. avinovi

Binomial name
- Polyommatus avinovi (Shchetkin, 1980)

Synonyms
- Rimisia avinovi Shchetkin, 1980

Species of butterfly

Polyommatus avinovi is a butterfly in the family Lycaenidae found in Central Asia. It was described by Yuri Shchetkin in 1980.

== Subspecies ==
- Polyommatus avinovi avinovi (Peter I Mountains)
- Polyommatus avinovi dangara (Eckweiler, 1997) (southern slope of the Eastern Gissar Mountains)
