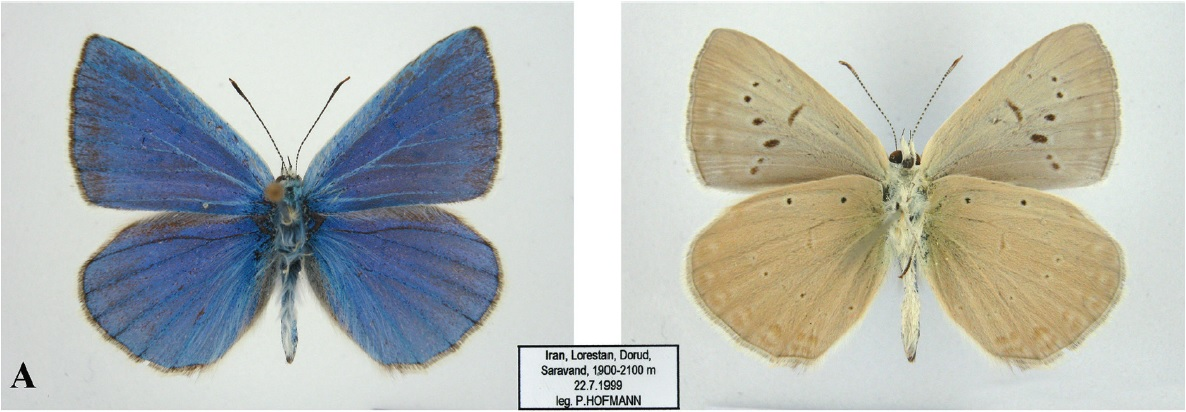
- P. k. saravandi male upperside (left) and underside (right)
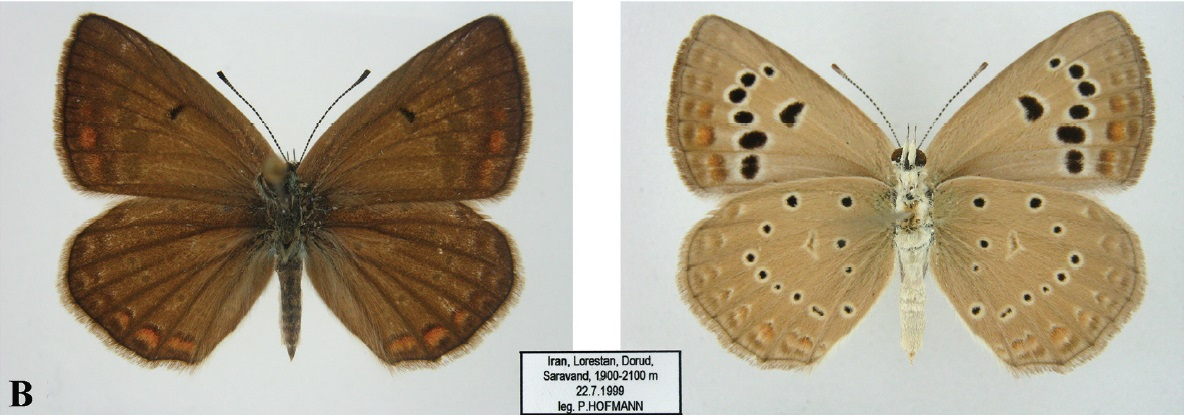
- P. k. saravandi female upperside (left) and underside (right)

Scientific classification
- Kingdom: Animalia
- Phylum: Arthropoda
- Class: Insecta
- Order: Lepidoptera
- Family: Lycaenidae
- Genus: Polyommatus
- Species: P. karindus

Binomial name
- Polyommatus karindus (Riley, 1921)

Synonyms
- Lycaena dama karinda Riley, 1921; Polyommatus karinda; Agrodiaetus karindus

= Polyommatus karindus =

Species of butterfly

Polyommatus karindus is a butterfly of the family Lycaenidae. It was described by Norman Denbigh Riley in 1921. It is only known from the Iranian Zagros Mountains. The habitat consists of dry slopes, gorges and plateaus with xerophyte or steppe vegetation, sometimes wooded areas from 1,800 up to 2,800 meters.

The length of the forewings is 30–36 mm. The ground colour of the males is bright blue with an azure tint. The discoidal, submarginal and antemarginal marking are absent on both forewings and hindwings. The black outer marginal line on the forewings and hindwings is very narrow. The forewing hind margin has a long white pubescence. The fringes of both wings are dark grey and tips of the hindwing veins are indicated with fine black. The female ground colour is brown with vastly darker veins. There are discoidal black spots present on the forewings and the submarginal markings are dark brown with the orange submarginal lunules well developed on the forewing and hindwings. The fringe is greyish brown.

== Subspecies ==
- Polyommatus karindus karindus
- Polyommatus karindus saravandi Shapoval & Lukhtanov, 2015 (Central part of Zagros Mountains, Iran)
