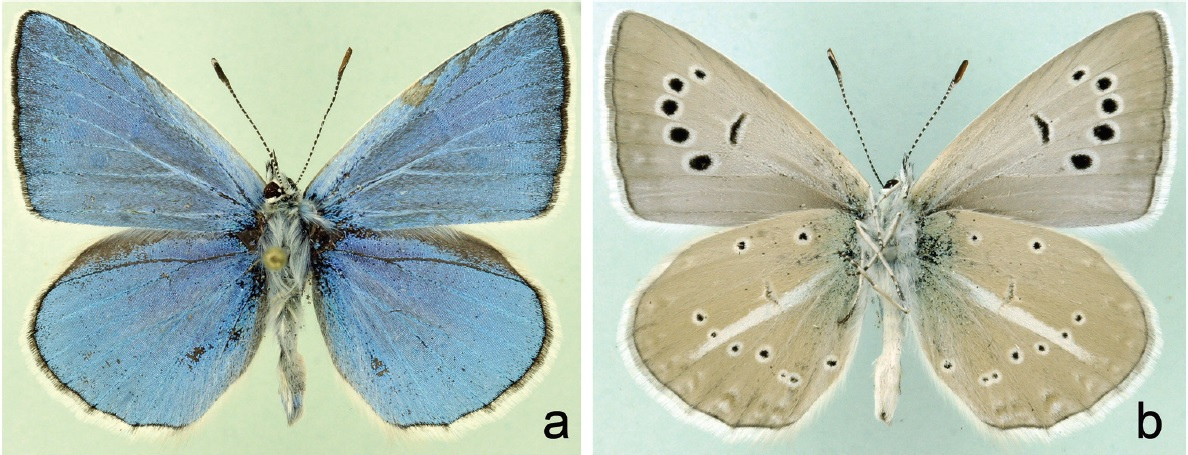
- Male upperside (left) and underside (right)

Scientific classification
- Kingdom: Animalia
- Phylum: Arthropoda
- Class: Insecta
- Order: Lepidoptera
- Family: Lycaenidae
- Genus: Polyommatus
- Species: P. poseidon

Binomial name
- Polyommatus poseidon (Lederer, 1852)

Synonyms
- Lycaena poseidon Lederer, 1852; Agrodiaetus poseidon; Lycaena poseidon var. mesopotamica Staudinger, 1892

= Polyommatus poseidon =

Species of butterfly

Polyommatus poseidon is a butterfly of the family Lycaenidae. It was described by Julius Lederer in 1852. It is found from Kütahya in western Turkey to Artvin in north-eastern Turkey, as well as in Georgia.
