= Polyommatus barmifiruze =

Scientific classification
- Kingdom: Animalia
- Phylum: Arthropoda
- Class: Insecta
- Order: Lepidoptera
- Family: Lycaenidae
- Genus: Polyommatus
- Species: P. barmifiruze

Binomial name
- Polyommatus barmifiruze (Carbonell, 2000)

Synonyms
- Agrodiaetus barmifiruze Carbonell, 2000

Species of butterfly

Polyommatus barmifiruze is a butterfly in the family Lycaenidae. It was described by Frédéric Carbonell in 2000. It is found in Iran.
