= Polyommatus afghanicus =

Scientific classification
- Kingdom: Animalia
- Phylum: Arthropoda
- Class: Insecta
- Order: Lepidoptera
- Family: Lycaenidae
- Genus: Polyommatus
- Species: P. afghanicus

Binomial name
- Polyommatus afghanicus (Forster, 1973)

Synonyms
- Agrodiaetus afghanica Forster, 1973; Polyommatus afghanica (Forster, 1973)

Species of butterfly

Polyommatus afghanicus is a butterfly of the family Lycaenidae. It was described by Walter Forster in 1973. It is found in Afghanistan.
