= Polyommatus antidolus =

Scientific classification
- Kingdom: Animalia
- Phylum: Arthropoda
- Class: Insecta
- Order: Lepidoptera
- Family: Lycaenidae
- Genus: Polyommatus
- Species: P. antidolus

Binomial name
- Polyommatus antidolus (Rebel, 1901)

Synonyms
- Lycaena dolus var. antidolus Rebel, 1901; Agrodiaetus antidolus pertekensis Carbonell, 2003

Species of butterfly

Polyommatus antidolus is a butterfly in the family Lycaenidae. It was described by Hans Rebel in 1901. It is found in Turkey.

== Subspecies ==
- Polyommatus antidolus antidolus (Kurdistan)
- Polyommatus antidolus pertekensis (Carbonell, 2003) (Turkey)
