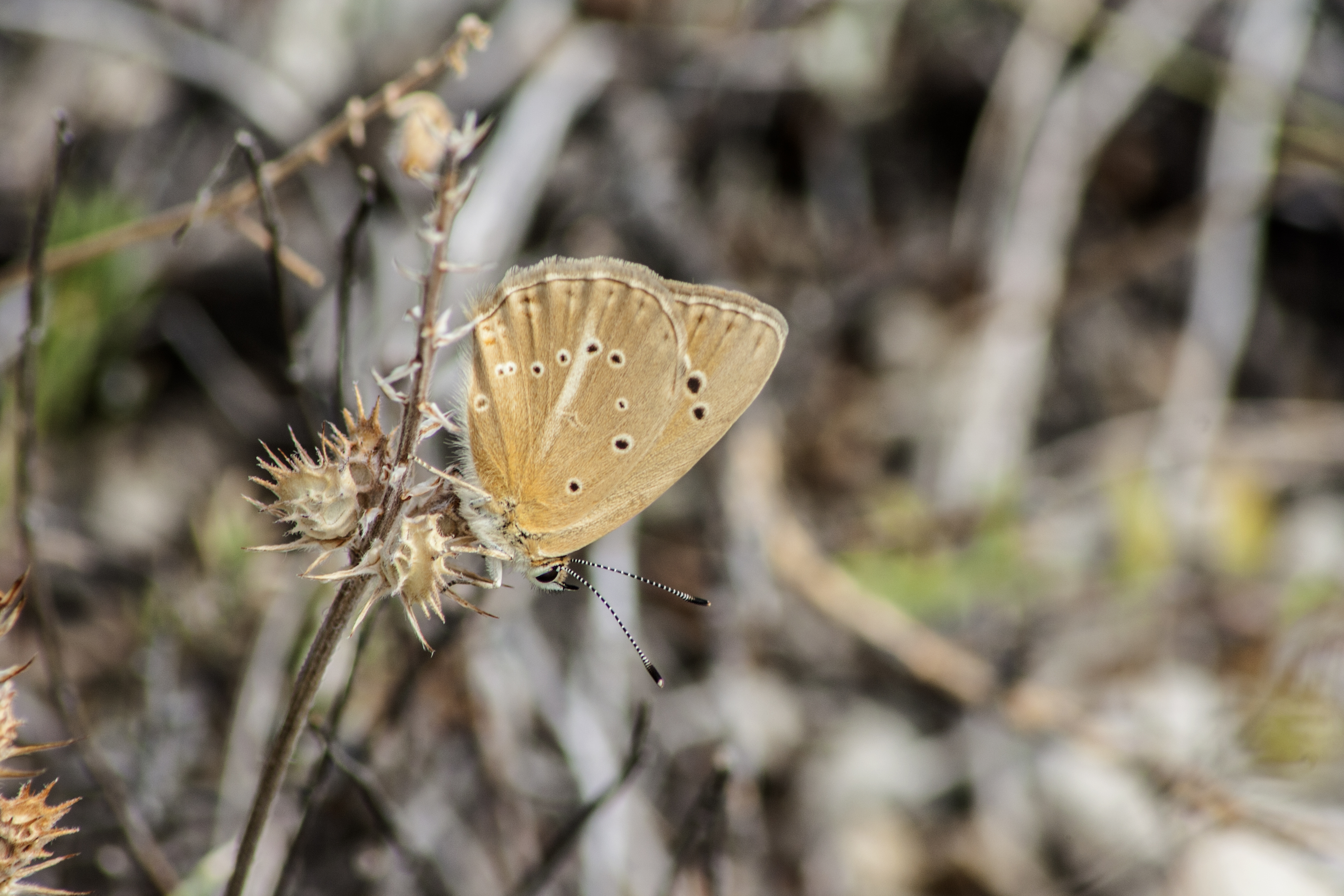

Conservation status
- Least Concern (IUCN 3.1)

Scientific classification
- Kingdom: Animalia
- Phylum: Arthropoda
- Class: Insecta
- Order: Lepidoptera
- Family: Lycaenidae
- Genus: Polyommatus
- Species: P. violetae

Binomial name
- Polyommatus violetae (Gómez-Bustillo, Expósito & Martínez, 1979)

= Polyommatus violetae =

Species of butterfly

Polyommatus (Agrodiaetus) violetae, the Andalusian anomalous blue, is a species of butterfly in the family Lycaenidae. It is found in the south (subspecies violetae) and south-east (subspecies subbaeticus) of Spain. Adults are on wing from July to August.

== Subspecies ==
Two subspecies:

- Polyommatus (Agrodiaetus) violetae violetae (Gómez-Bustillo, Expósito & Martínez, 1979)

Type locality: Sierra de Almijara, south-eastern Málaga province, southern Andalusia region, southern Spain
The larvae feed on Onobrychis argentea argentea

- Polyommatus (Agrodiaetus) violetae subbaeticus Gil-T. & Gil-Uceda, 2005)

Type locality: Sierra de la Sagra, northern Granada province, north-eastern Andalusia region, south-eastern Spain.
The larvae feed on Onobrychis argentea hispanica
Note: the taxon subbaeticus was described as a subspecies of Agrodiaetus fabressei (Oberthür, 1910), but molecular studies have demonstrate that belongs to the species violetae.

== Synonyms ==
- Agrodiaetus violetae violetae = Agrodiaetus fabressei violetae Gómez-Bustillo, Expósito & Martínez, 1979
- Agrodiaetus violetae subbaeticus = Agrodiaetus fabressei subbaeticus Gil-T. & Gil-Uceda, 2005

== Combination ==
- Valid combination: Agrodiaetus violetae Gómez-Bustillo, Expósito & Martínez, 1979
