= Polyommatus baytopi =

Scientific classification
- Kingdom: Animalia
- Phylum: Arthropoda
- Class: Insecta
- Order: Lepidoptera
- Family: Lycaenidae
- Genus: Polyommatus
- Species: P. baytopi

Binomial name
- Polyommatus baytopi (de Lesse, 1959)

Synonyms
- Agrodiaetus baytopi de Lesse, 1959

Species of butterfly

Polyommatus baytopi is a butterfly in the family Lycaenidae. It was described by de Hubert de Lesse in 1959. Type locality is given as "Dogubayazit (Turquie Orient.)" [E. Turkey, Agri Prov.], at 2300m altitude. The species range is Eastern Turkey.
