= Polyommatus ahmadi =

Scientific classification
- Kingdom: Animalia
- Phylum: Arthropoda
- Class: Insecta
- Order: Lepidoptera
- Family: Lycaenidae
- Genus: Polyommatus
- Species: P. ahmadi

Binomial name
- Polyommatus ahmadi (Carbonell, 2001)

Synonyms
- Agrodiaetus ahmadi Carbonell, 2001

Species of butterfly

Polyommatus ahmadi is a butterfly of the family Lycaenidae. It was described by Frédéric Carbonell in 2001. It is found in the Zanjan Province of Iran.
