= Polyommatus artvinensis =

Scientific classification
- Kingdom: Animalia
- Phylum: Arthropoda
- Class: Insecta
- Order: Lepidoptera
- Family: Lycaenidae
- Genus: Polyommatus
- Species: P. artvinensis

Binomial name
- Polyommatus artvinensis (Carbonell, 1997)

Synonyms
- Agrodiaetus actis artvinensis Carbonell, 1997

Species of butterfly

Polyommatus artvinensis is a butterfly in the family Lycaenidae. It was described by Frédéric Carbonell in 1997. It is found in Turkey, where it is only known from the north-eastern Pontic chain, in the provinces of Erzurum and Artvin.

The length of the forewings is 13.5–16 mm.
