= Polyommatus anticarmon =

Scientific classification
- Kingdom: Animalia
- Phylum: Arthropoda
- Class: Insecta
- Order: Lepidoptera
- Family: Lycaenidae
- Genus: Polyommatus
- Species: P. anticarmon

Binomial name
- Polyommatus anticarmon (Koçak, 1983)

Synonyms
- Agrodiaetus (Transcaspius) anticarmon Koçak, 1983

Species of butterfly

Polyommatus anticarmon, the anticarmon blue, is a butterfly in the family Lycaenidae. It was described by Ahmet Ömer Koçak in 1983. It is found in Turkey.
