= Polyommatus =

- Polyommatus icarus

Scientific classification
- Kingdom: Animalia
- Phylum: Arthropoda
- Clade: Pancrustacea
- Class: Insecta
- Order: Lepidoptera
- Family: Lycaenidae
- Subfamily: Polyommatinae
- Tribe: Polyommatini
- Genus: Polyommatus; Latreille, 1804

Synonyms
- Agrodiaetus Hübner, 1822; Hirsutina Tutt, 1909; Bryna Evans, 1912; Meleageria Sagarra, 1925; Plebicula Higgins, 1969; Paragrodiaetus Rose & Schurian, 1977; Sublysandra Kocak, 1977; Admetusia Koçak & Seven, 1998; Thersitesia Koçak & Seven, 1998

Butterfly genus in family Lycaenidae

Polyommatus is a genus of butterflies in the family Lycaenidae. Its species are found in the Palearctic realm.

== Taxonomy ==
Recent molecular studies have demonstrated that Cyaniris, Lysandra, and Neolysandra are different genera from Polyommatus, where they had been included, sometimes as subgenera.

Some authors still recognize other subgenera, such as Agrodiaetus, Bryna, Meleageria, and Plebicula.

== List of species ==
- Polyommatus abdon E. & U. Aistleitner, 1994
- Polyommatus achaemenes (Skala, 2002)
- Polyommatus actinides (Staudinger, 1886)
- Polyommatus actis (Herrich-Schäffer, 1851)
- Polyommatus admetus (Esper, 1785)
- Polyommatus aedon (Christoph, 1887)
- Polyommatus afghanicus (Forster, 1973)
- Polyommatus afghanistana (Forster, 1972)
- Polyommatus ahmadi (Carbonell, 2001)
- Polyommatus alcestis (Zerny, 1932)
- Polyommatus aloisi (Bálint, 1988)
- Polyommatus altivagans (Forster, 1956)
- Polyommatus amandus (Schneider, 1792) Amanda's blue
- Polyommatus amor (Lang, 1884)
- Polyommatus annamaria (Tutt, 1909)
- Polyommatus anthea (Grum-Grshimailo, 1890)
- Polyommatus anticarmon (Koçak, 1983)
- Polyommatus antidolus (Rebel, 1901)
- Polyommatus arasbarani (Carbonell & Naderi, 2000)
- Polyommatus ardschira (Brandt, 1938)
- Polyommatus ariana (Tutt, 1909)
- Polyommatus aroaniensis (Brown, 1976) Grecian anomalous blue
- Polyommatus artvinensis (Carbonell, 1997)
- Polyommatus aserbeidschanus (Forster, 1956)
- Polyommatus atlantica (Elwes, 1905)
- Polyommatus attalaensis (Carbonell et al., 2004)
- Polyommatus australorossicus Lukhtanov & Dantchenko, 2017
- Polyommatus avinovi (Shchetkin, 1980)
- Polyommatus baltazardi (de Lesse, 1963)
- Polyommatus barmifiruze (Carbonell, 2000)
- Polyommatus baytopi (de Lesse, 1959)
- Polyommatus bilgini (Dantchenko & Lukhtanov, 2002) Turkey
- Polyommatus bilucha (Moore, 1884) Baluchistan - Tibet
- Polyommatus birunii Eckweiler & ten Hagen, 1998 Iran
- Polyommatus biton (Sulzer, 1776) Alps
- Polyommatus bogra Tshikolovets, 1992 Baluchistan, Iran
- Polyommatus boisduvalii (Herrich-Schäffer, 1844)
- Polyommatus buzulmavi (Carbonell, 1992) Kurdistan
- Polyommatus caeruleus (Staudinger, 1871) Asia Minor
- Polyommatus carmon (Herrich-Schäffer, 1851) Asia Minor, Iran
- Polyommatus carmonides (de Lesse, 1960) Caucasus
- Polyommatus celina (Austaut, 1879) Algeria
- Polyommatus chitralensis (Oberthür, 1910) Himalayas
- Polyommatus cilicius (Carbonell, 1998) Turkey
- Polyommatus ciloicus (Tutt, 1909) Kurdistan, Iran
- Polyommatus cornelia (Gerhard, 1851) Asia Minor, Elburs
- Polyommatus cyaneus (Staudinger, 1899) ) Asia Minor, Transcaucasia, Iran, Georgia, Armenia, Azerbaijan, Talysh Mts.
- Polyommatus dagestanicus (Forster, 1960) Caucasus Major, Azerbaijan.
- Polyommatus dagmara (Grum-Grshimailo, 1888) Ghissar, Darvaz, Alai
- Polyommatus dama (Staudinger, 1891) Mesopotamian blue
- Polyommatus damocles (Herrich-Schäffer, 1844) Urals, Crimea, Turkey
- Polyommatus damon (Denis & Schiffermüller, 1775)
- Polyommatus damone (Eversmann, 1841)
- Polyommatus damonides (Staudinger, 1899)
- Polyommatus dantchenkoi (Lukhtanov & Wiemers, 2003) Turkey
- Polyommatus daphnis (Denis & Schiffermüller, 1775)
- Polyommatus darius Eckweiler & ten Hagen, 1998 Iran
- Polyommatus deebi (Larsen, 1974) Lebanon
- Polyommatus demavendi (Pfeiffer, 1938) ) Transcaucasia, Turkey, Iran
- Polyommatus dizinensis (Schurian, 1982) Kurdistan
- Polyommatus dolus (Hübner, 1823) furry blue
- Polyommatus dorylas (Denis & Schiffermüller, 1775)
- Polyommatus dux (Tutt, 1909) Northwest India
- Polyommatus ectabanensis (de Lesse, 1963) Northwest India
- Polyommatus elena Stradomsky & Arzanov, 1999 Lower Don, Lower Volga, Siberia
- Polyommatus erigone (Grum-Grshimailo, 1890) Pamirs
- Polyommatus eriwanensis (Forster, 1960) Armenia
- Polyommatus ernesti (Eckweiler, 1989) Turkey
- Polyommatus eroides (Frivaldszky, 1835) Balkans, Asia Minor
- Polyommatus eros (Ochsenheimer, 1808)
- Polyommatus erotides (Kurentzov, 1970)
- Polyommatus erschoffi (Lederer, 1869) Iran, Kopet-Dagh, Afghanistan
- Polyommatus erzindjanensis (Carbonell, 2002) Turkey
- Polyommatus escheri (Hübner, 1823)
- Polyommatus esfahensis (Carbonell, 2000) Iran
- Polyommatus evansi (Forster, 1956) Himalayas
- Polyommatus everesti Riley, 1923 Tibet
- Polyommatus fabiani (Staudinger, 1899) Mongolia
- Polyommatus fabressei (Oberthür, 1910) Oberthür's anomalous blue Iberia
- Polyommatus femininoides (Eckweiler, 1987) Caucasus, Elburs
- Polyommatus firdussii (Forster, 1956) Kurdistan
- Polyommatus forresti (Kurentzov, 1970) Himalayas, Yunnan
- Polyommatus forsteri (Pfeiffer, 1938) Iran
- Polyommatus fraterluci (Grum-Grshimailo, 1890) Punjab
- Polyommatus frauvartianae (Lederer, 1870) Afghanistan
- Polyommatus fulgens (Sagarra, 1925) Catalan furry blue
- Polyommatus glaucias (Lederer, 1870) Kopet-Dagh, Elburs Mts
- Polyommatus golgus (Hübner, 1813) Sierra Nevada blue
- Polyommatus gorbunovi (Eckweiler, 1989) Caucasus
- Polyommatus guezelmavi (Olivier, Puplesiene, van der Poorten, de Prins & Wiemers, 1999) Turkey
- Polyommatus haigi (Dantchenko & Lukhtanov, 2002) Turkey
- Polyommatus hamadanensis (de Lesse, 1959) Iran
- Polyommatus hopfferi (Herrich-Schäffer, 1851) Asia Minor - Kurdistan
- Polyommatus huberti (Carbonell, 1993) Armenia, Turkey
- Polyommatus humedasae (Toso & Balletto, 1976) Piedmont anomalous blue
- Polyommatus hunza (Grum-Grshimailo, 1890) Pamirs, Hindu Kush
- Polyommatus icadius (Grum-Grshimailo, 1890)
- Polyommatus icarus (Rottemburg, 1775) common blue
- Polyommatus igisizilim (Dantchenko, 2000)
- Polyommatus interjectus (De Lesse, 1960)
- Polyommatus iphicarmon (Courvoisier, 1913)
- Polyommatus iphidamon (Staudinger, 1899)
- Polyommatus iphigenia (Herrich-Schäffer, 1847)
- Polyommatus iphigenides (Staudinger, 1886)
- Polyommatus isauricoides (Gerhard, 1851)
- Polyommatus ischkaschimicus (de Lesse, 1957)
- Polyommatus juldusa (Staudinger, 1886)
- Polyommatus juno (Grum-Grshimailo, 1891)
- Polyommatus kamtshadalis (Sheljuzhko, 1933)
- Polyommatus kanduli (Dantchenko & Lukhtanov, 2002)
- Polyommatus karindus (Riley, 1921)
- Polyommatus kashgharensis (Grum-Grshimailo, 1891)
- Polyommatus kendevani (Forster, 1956)
- Polyommatus khorasanensis (Carbonell, 2001)
- Polyommatus khoshyeilagi (Blom, 1979)
- Polyommatus klausschuriani (ten Hagen, 1999)
- Polyommatus kurdistanicus (Forster, 1961)
- Polyommatus larseni (Carbonell, 1994)
- Polyommatus lorestanus (Eckweiler, 1997)
- Polyommatus lycius (Carbonell, 1996)
- Polyommatus magnifica (Grum-Grshimailo, 1885)
- Polyommatus marcida (Lederer, 1870)
- Polyommatus melanius (Staudinger, 1886)
- Polyommatus menalcas (Freyer, 1837)
- Polyommatus menelaos (Kurentzov, 1970)
- Polyommatus meoticus (Ochsenheimer, 1808)
- Polyommatus merhaba (de Prins, van der Poorten, Borie, Oorschot, Riemis & Coenen, 1991)
- Polyommatus mithridates (Toso & Balletto, 1976)
- Polyommatus mofidi (de Lesse, 1963)
- Polyommatus morgani (Le Cerf, 1909)
- Polyommatus muetingi (Bálint, 1992)
- Polyommatus myrrha (Herrich-Schäffer, 1851)
- Polyommatus nadira (Moore, 1884)
- Polyommatus nekrutenkoi (Dantchenko et al., 2004)
- Polyommatus nephohiptamenos (Brown & Coutsis, 1978) Higgins's anomalous blue
- Polyommatus ninae (Forster, 1956)
- Polyommatus nivescens (Keferstein, 1851) mother-of-pearl blue
- Polyommatus nuksani (Forster, 1937)
- Polyommatus paulae (Wiemers & De Prins, 2004)
- Polyommatus peilei (Le Cerf, 1909)
- Polyommatus pfeifferi (Brandt, 1938)
- Polyommatus phillipi (Lederer, 1852)
- Polyommatus phyllides (Staudinger, 1886)
- Polyommatus phyllis (Christoph, 1877)
- Polyommatus pierceae (Lukhtanov & Dantchenko, 2002)
- Polyommatus pierinoi (Grum-Grshimailo, 1890)
- Polyommatus polonus (Schurian & Hofmann, 1983)
- Polyommatus poseidon (Herrich-Schäffer, [1851])
- Polyommatus poseidonides (Staudinger, 1886)
- Polyommatus posthumus (Christoph, 1877)
- Polyommatus pseudactis (Forster, 1960)
- Polyommatus pseuderos (Kurentzov, 1970)
- Polyommatus pseudorjabovi Lukhtanov, Dantchenko, Vishnevskaya & Saifitdinova, 2015
- Polyommatus pseudoxerxes (Forster, 1956)
- Polyommatus pulchella (Bernard, 1951)
- Polyommatus putnami (Dantchenko & Lukhtanov, 2002)
- Polyommatus ripartii (Freyer, 1830) Ripart's anomalous blue
- Polyommatus rjabovi (Forster, 1960)
- Polyommatus rovshani (Christoph, 1877)
- Polyommatus sagratrox (Aistleitner, 1986)
- Polyommatus schuriani (Rose, 1978)
- Polyommatus sennanensis (de Lesse, 1959)
- Polyommatus sertavulensis (Koçak, 1979)
- Polyommatus shahrami (Skala, 2001)
- Polyommatus shamil (Dantchenko, 2000)
- Polyommatus shirkuhensis ten Hagen & Eckweiler, 2001
- Polyommatus sigberti (Olivier, Poorten, Puplesiene & de Prins, 2000)
- Polyommatus stigmatifera (Ochsenheimer, 1808)
- Polyommatus stoliczkanus (Felder & Felder, 1865)
- Polyommatus surakovi (Koçak, 1996)
- Polyommatus sutleja (Moore, 1882)
- Polyommatus tankeri (de Lesse, 1960)
- Polyommatus tenhageni Schurian & Eckweiler, 1999
- Polyommatus theresiae (Schurian & van Oorschot & van den Brink, 1992)
- Polyommatus thersites (Cantener, 1834) Chapman's blue
- Polyommatus timfristos Lukhtanov, Vishnevskaya & Shapoval, 2016
- Polyommatus transcaspicus (Staudinger, 1899)
- Polyommatus tshetverikovi (Ochsenheimer, 1808)
- Polyommatus tsvetaevi (Forster, 1961)
- Polyommatus turcicolus (Koçak, 1977)
- Polyommatus turcicus (Koçak, 1977
- Polyommatus valiabadi (Rose & Schurian, 1977)
- Polyommatus vanensis (de Lesse, 1957)
- Polyommatus venus (Staudinger, 1886)
- Polyommatus violetae (Gómez-Bustillo, Expósito & Martínez, 1979) Andalusian anomalous blue
- Polyommatus wagneri (Forster, 1956)
- Polyommatus yurinekrutenko (Koçak, 1996)
- Polyommatus zapvadi (Carbonell, 1993)
- Polyommatus zarathustra (Eckweiler, 1997)
- Polyommatus zardensis (Schurian & ten Hagen, 2001)
