= Polyommatus ardschira =

Scientific classification
- Kingdom: Animalia
- Phylum: Arthropoda
- Class: Insecta
- Order: Lepidoptera
- Family: Lycaenidae
- Genus: Polyommatus
- Species: P. ardschira

Binomial name
- Polyommatus ardschira (Brandt, 1938)

Synonyms
- Lycaena ardschira Brandt, 1938

Species of butterfly

Polyommatus ardschira is a butterfly in the family Lycaenidae. It was described by W. Brandt in 1938. It is found in the Elburz Mountains.
