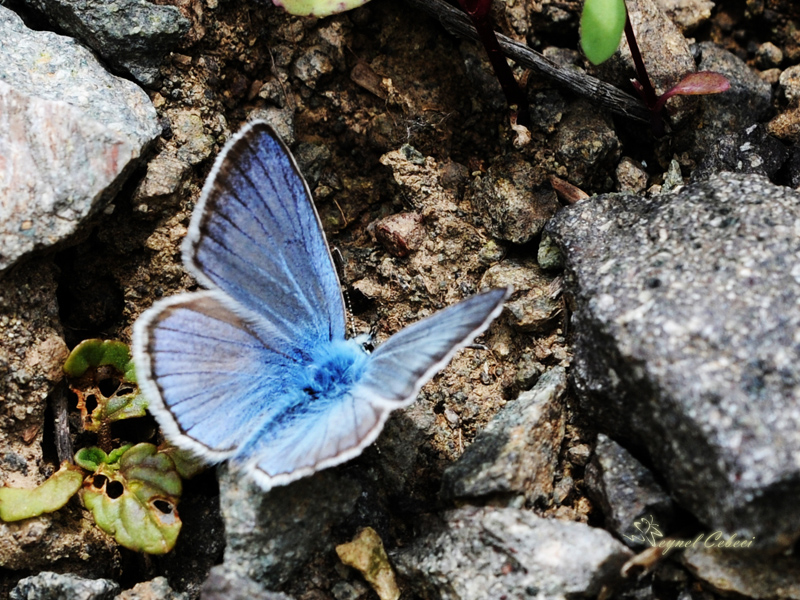
- Polyommatus iphigenia

Scientific classification
- Kingdom: Animalia
- Phylum: Arthropoda
- Class: Insecta
- Order: Lepidoptera
- Family: Lycaenidae
- Genus: Polyommatus
- Species: P. iphigenia

Binomial name
- Polyommatus iphigenia Herrich-Schäffer, [1847]

= Polyommatus iphigenia =

Species of butterfly

Polyommatus iphigenia is a butterfly of the family Lycaenidae. It was described by Gottlieb August Wilhelm Herrich-Schäffer in 1847. It is found in the Balkans and Asia Minor.

== Subspecies ==
- P. i. iphigenia Anatolia
- P. i. araratensis (de Lesse, 1957) Turkey
- P. i. nonacriensis (Brown, 1976) Greece
- P. i. manuelae Eckweiler & Schurian, 2013

== Description from Seitz ==
Polyommatus iphigenia H.-Schaff. (81i) is again similar to damon, above more greenish blue, with broad black border, the costal and apical areas of the hindwing also being black. The underside is paler and has smaller ocelli. Asia Minor and Persia.

== Biology ==
The larvae feed on Onobrychis species.It overwinters in the young caterpillar stage which tended by Lasius alienus .It flies in one generation, July August.Its habitat consists of dry places on calcareous soils.

== Etymology ==
Named in the classical tradition for Iphigenia.
