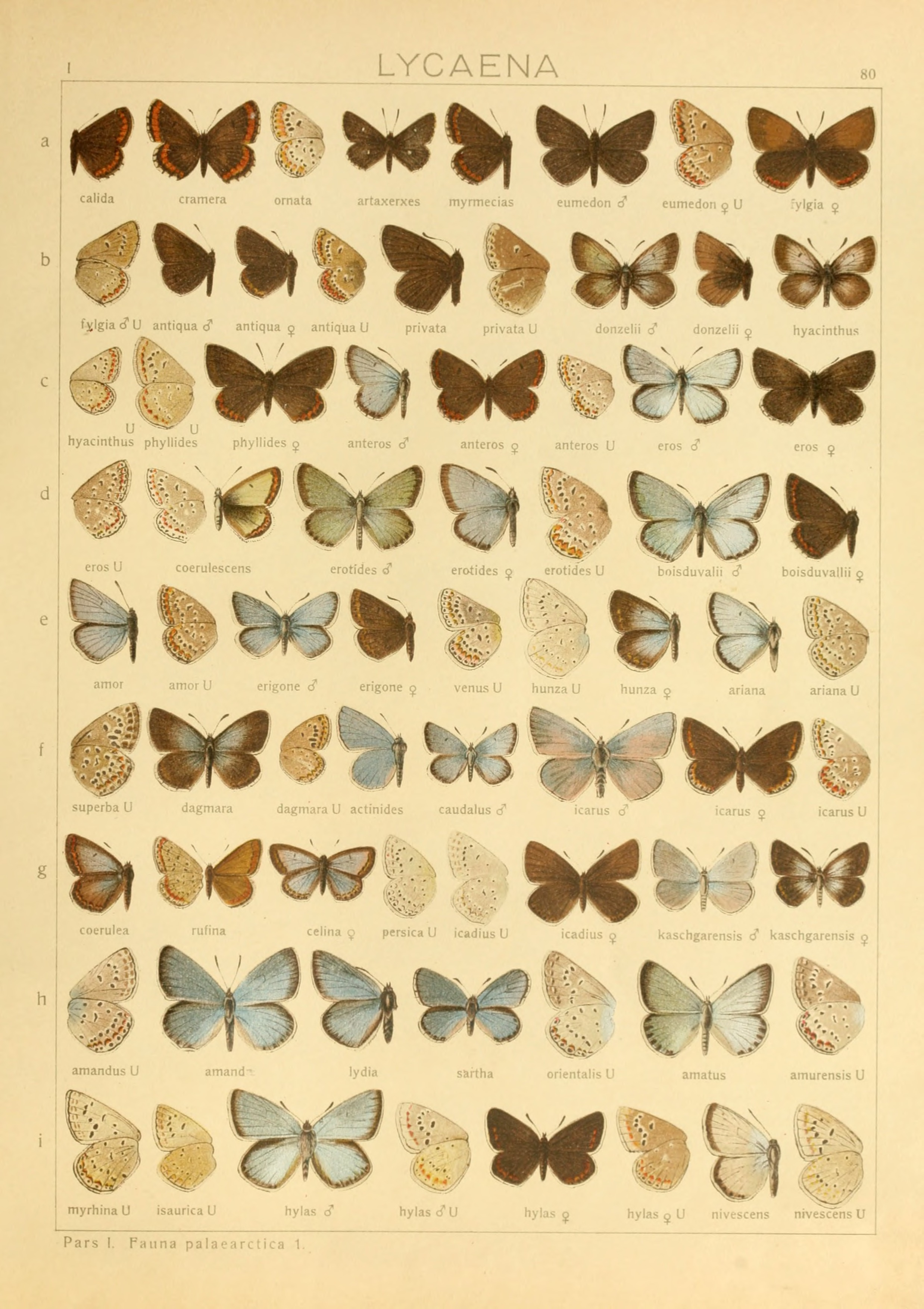
- Seitz plate 80e

Scientific classification
- Kingdom: Animalia
- Phylum: Arthropoda
- Class: Insecta
- Order: Lepidoptera
- Family: Lycaenidae
- Genus: Polyommatus
- Species: P. amor

Binomial name
- Polyommatus amor (Lang, 1884)

Synonyms
- Lycaena eros var. amor Lang, 1884; Lycaena eros var. amor Staudinger, 1886

= Polyommatus amor =

Species of butterfly

Polyommatus amor is a butterfly in the family Lycaenidae. It was described by Lang in 1884. It is found in Ghissar, Darvaz and the western Pamir Mountains.

In amor Stgr. (80 e), from Ferghana and the Tian-shan, the blue of the upperside of the male has a violet sheen, nearly as in icarus, and the black margin is narrower.

The larvae feed on Astragalus species.
