= Polyommatus australorossicus =

Scientific classification
- Kingdom: Animalia
- Phylum: Arthropoda
- Class: Insecta
- Order: Lepidoptera
- Family: Lycaenidae
- Genus: Polyommatus
- Species: P. australorossicus

Binomial name
- Polyommatus australorossicus Lukhtanov & Dantchenko, 2017

Species of butterfly

Polyommatus australorossicus, the South-Russian blue, is a butterfly species in the family Lycaenidae. It was described by Vladimir A. Lukhtanov and Alexander V. Dantchenko in 2017 and is found in southern Russia in the Caucasus Mountains.
