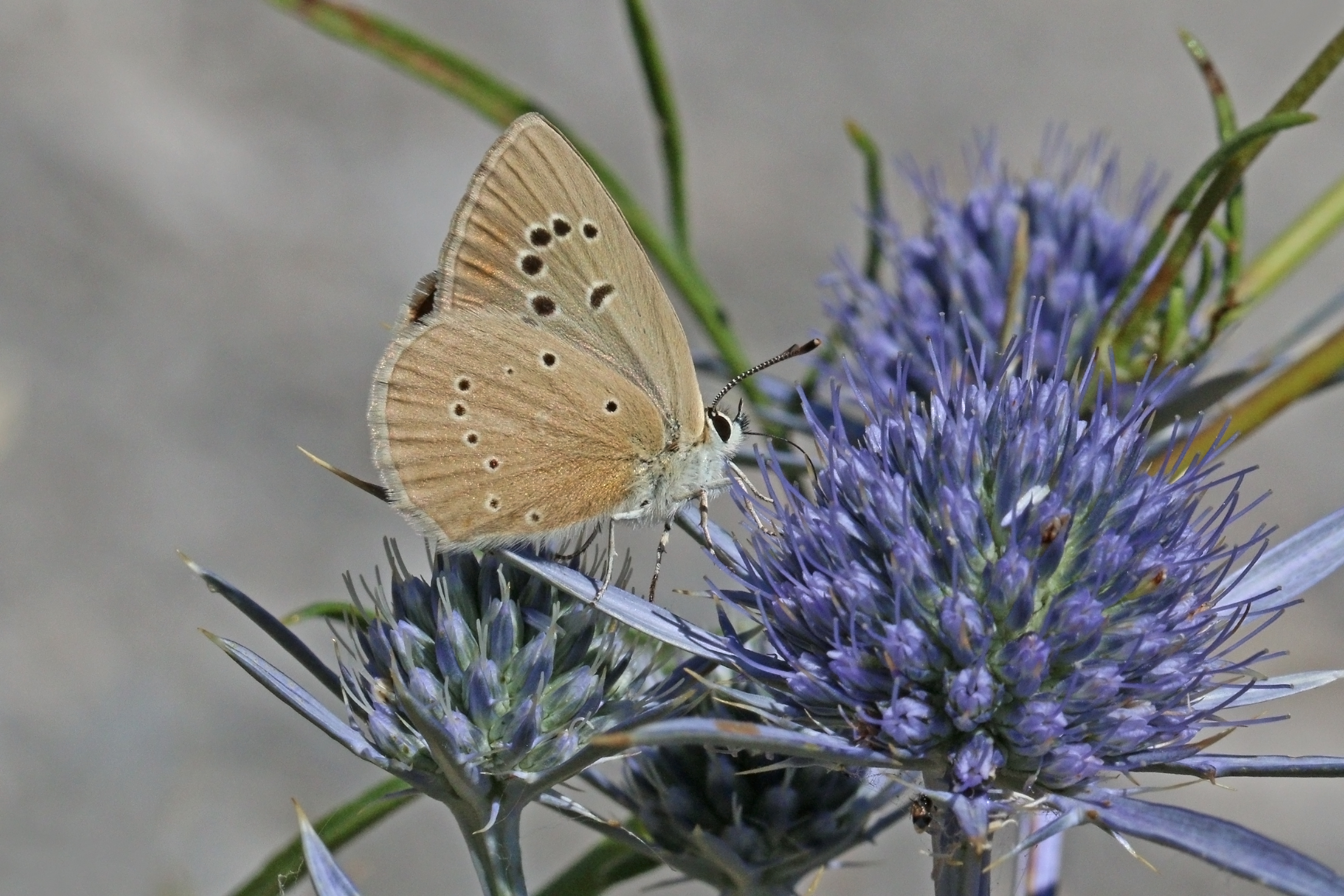
- Galichica National Park; North Macedonia

Scientific classification
- Kingdom: Animalia
- Phylum: Arthropoda
- Clade: Pancrustacea
- Class: Insecta
- Order: Lepidoptera
- Family: Lycaenidae
- Genus: Polyommatus
- Species: P. aroaniensis

Binomial name
- Polyommatus aroaniensis (Brown, 1976)

Synonyms
- Agrodiaetus aroaniensis Brown, 1976

= Polyommatus aroaniensis =

Species of butterfly

Polyommatus aroaniensis, the Grecian anomalous blue, is a butterfly in the family Lycaenidae. It was described by John W. Brown in 1976. It is found on the Balkan Peninsula.

The wingspan is 28–32 mm. Adults are on wing from July to August.

The larvae feed on Onobrychis species.
