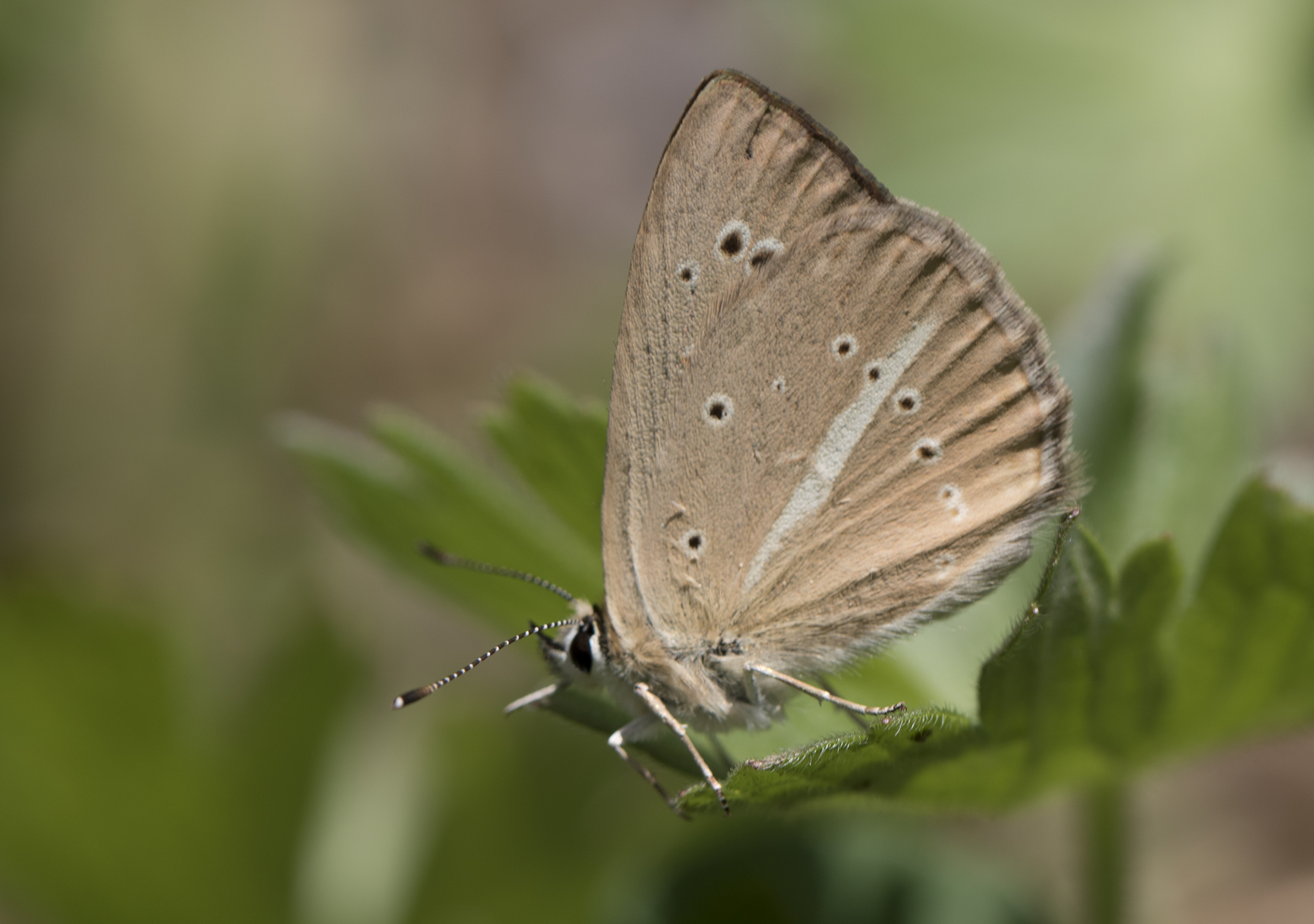

Scientific classification
- Kingdom: Animalia
- Phylum: Arthropoda
- Class: Insecta
- Order: Lepidoptera
- Family: Lycaenidae
- Genus: Polyommatus
- Species: P. alcestis

Binomial name
- Polyommatus alcestis (Zerny, 1932)

Synonyms
- Lycaena ripperti alcestis Zerny, 1932; Agrodiaetus alcestis karacetinae Lukhtanov & Dantchenko, 2002

= Polyommatus alcestis =

Species of butterfly

Polyommatus alcestis is a butterfly of the family Lycaenidae. It was described by Hans Zerny in 1932. It is found in Turkey, Iran and the Levant.

== Subspecies ==
- Polyommatus alcestis alcestis (Asia Minor, Levant)
- Polyommatus alcestis karacetinae (Lukhtanov & Dantchenko, 2002) (south-eastern Turkey: Hakkari, western Iran)
