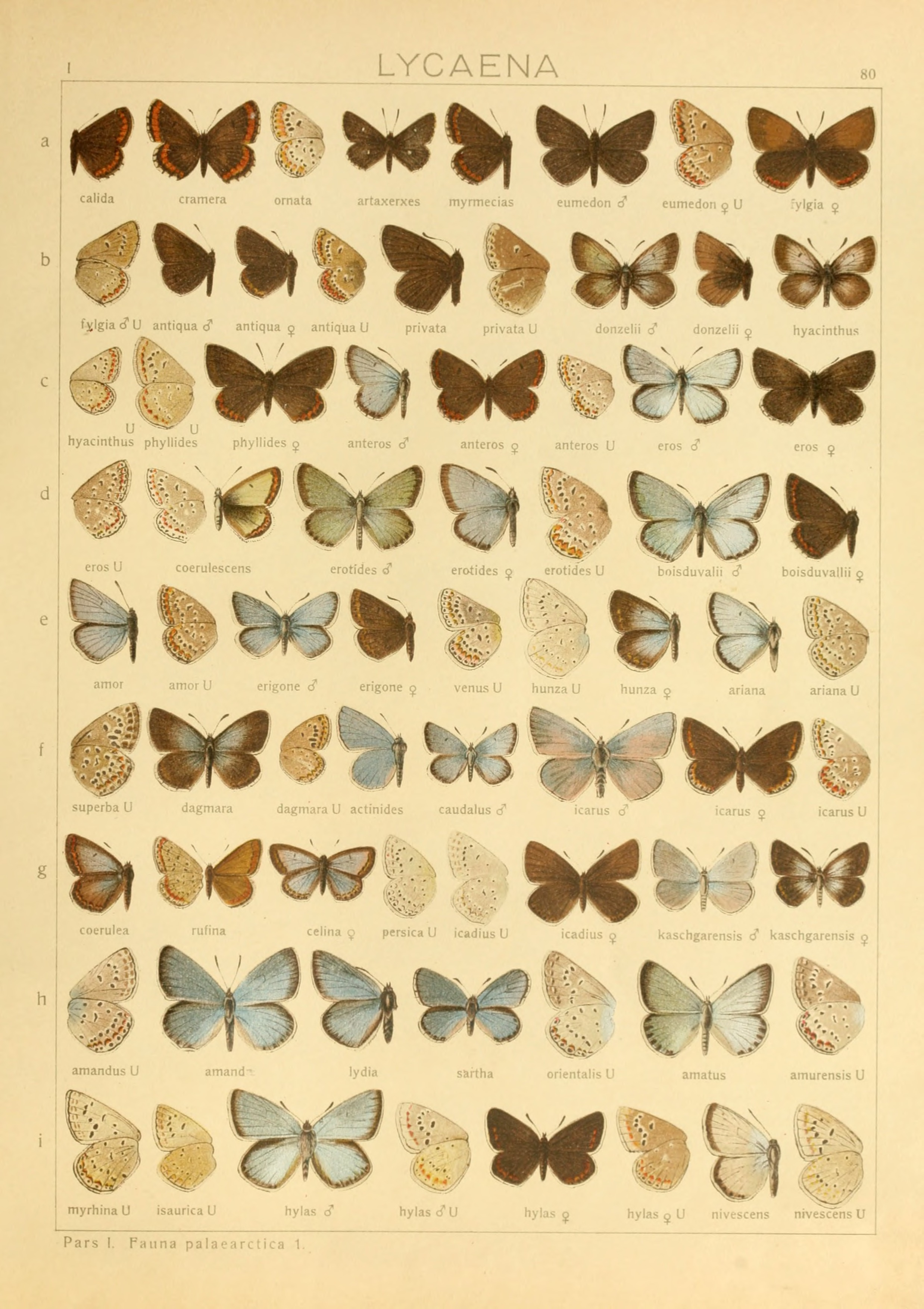
- Seitz plate 80e

Scientific classification
- Kingdom: Animalia
- Phylum: Arthropoda
- Class: Insecta
- Order: Lepidoptera
- Family: Lycaenidae
- Genus: Polyommatus
- Species: P. venus

Binomial name
- Polyommatus venus (Staudinger, 1886)

= Polyommatus venus =

Species of butterfly

Polyommatus venus is a butterfly in the family Lycaenidae. It was described by Otto Staudinger in 1886. The type locality is Kirghizia.

L. venus Stgr. (80e). Recognizable by the peculiar dazzling but not very metallic blue of the males. It is a deep sky-blue, not a violet-blue as in icarus, and not a green-blue as in eros. The female dark brown with more or less distinct reddish yellow marginal spots. Beneath similar to icarus and like this with basal ocelli on the forewing and blue-green sealing at the base, but the spots mostly more prominent the median streak of the hindwing sometimes vestigial (as in our figure) or more distinct, the red submarginal spots further away from the margin and the row of dots placed at its proximal side situated in a narrow white band formed by the pale borders of the ocelli being merged. Turkestan and Tibet (Amdo).

The forms lama Gr.-Grsh. [now P. eros ssp. lama Grum-Grshimailo, 1891], from the neighbourhood of Chincheng, and sinina Gr.-Grsh. [now P. venus ssp. sinina Grum-Grshimailo, 1891], from the foothills of the Sinin Mts., are said by Staudinger not to differ from the name-typical form; according to Grum-Grshmaailo, who places lama with eros, the former is more violet-blue and beneath darker, while sinina has a broader border than true venus. — The species is plentiful and flies on alpine meadows in June and July, ascending in the Pamirs up to 9000 ft.
