= Polyommatus annamaria =

Scientific classification
- Kingdom: Animalia
- Phylum: Arthropoda
- Class: Insecta
- Order: Lepidoptera
- Family: Lycaenidae
- Genus: Polyommatus
- Species: P. annamaria

Binomial name
- Polyommatus annamaria Bálint, 1992

Species of butterfly

Polyommatus annamaria is a butterfly in the family Lycaenidae. It was described by Zsolt Bálint in 1992. It is found in the north-western Pamir Mountains.
