= Polyommatus ariana =

Scientific classification
- Kingdom: Animalia
- Phylum: Arthropoda
- Clade: Pancrustacea
- Class: Insecta
- Order: Lepidoptera
- Family: Lycaenidae
- Genus: Polyommatus
- Species: P. ariana

Binomial name
- Polyommatus ariana Moore, 1865

Synonyms
- Polyommatus eros drasula Swinhoe, 1910; Polyommatus eros droshana Evans, 1925

Species of butterfly

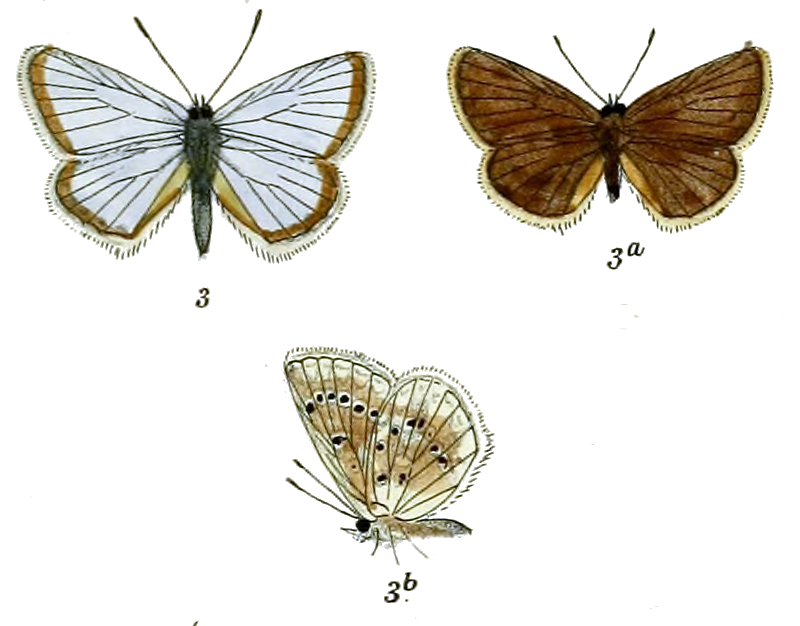
Polyommatus drasula

Polyommatus ariana is a butterfly in the family Lycaenidae. It was described by Frederic Moore in 1865. It is found in the western Himalayas.
