= Polyommatus anthea =

Scientific classification
- Kingdom: Animalia
- Phylum: Arthropoda
- Clade: Pancrustacea
- Class: Insecta
- Order: Lepidoptera
- Family: Lycaenidae
- Genus: Polyommatus
- Species: P. anthea

Binomial name
- Polyommatus anthea Hemming, 1932

Synonyms
- Polyommatus amandus anthea Hemming, 1932

Species of butterfly

Polyommatus anthea is a butterfly in the family Lycaenidae. It was described by Francis Hemming in 1932. It is found in Kurdistan and the Levant.
