= Polyommatus achaemenes =

Scientific classification
- Kingdom: Animalia
- Phylum: Arthropoda
- Class: Insecta
- Order: Lepidoptera
- Family: Lycaenidae
- Genus: Polyommatus
- Species: P. achaemenes

Binomial name
- Polyommatus achaemenes (Skala, 2002)

Synonyms
- Agrodiaetus achaemenes Skala, 2002

Species of butterfly

Polyommatus achaemenes is a butterfly of the family Lycaenidae. It was described by Skala in 2002. It is only known from very high altitudes (ranging from 3,800 to 4,000 meters) in the Iranian Zagros Mountains (Kuh-e-Haft, Bakhtiari).
