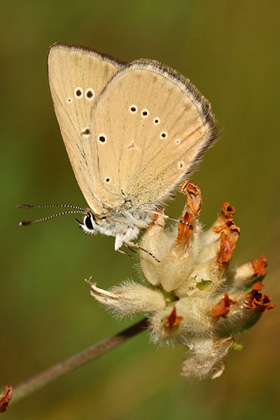

Conservation status
- Critically Endangered (IUCN 3.1)

Scientific classification
- Kingdom: Animalia
- Phylum: Arthropoda
- Clade: Pancrustacea
- Class: Insecta
- Order: Lepidoptera
- Family: Lycaenidae
- Genus: Polyommatus
- Species: P. humedasae

Binomial name
- Polyommatus humedasae (Toso & Balletto, 1976)

= Piedmont anomalous blue =

Species of butterfly

The Piedmont anomalous blue (Polyommatus humedasae) is a species of butterfly in the family Lycaenidae. It is endemic to Italy, where it is known mostly from the Aosta Valley in the Italian Alps. It is mainly found on altitudes of 800 to 1,000 meters but at times up to 1,600 meters.

There is one generation per year with adults on wing from July to August, with a peak in the second half of July.

The larvae feed on the flowers of Onobrychis montana and Onobrychis viciifolia. They are attended to by ants.
