= Polyommatus ninae =

Nina's blue

Scientific classification
- Kingdom: Animalia
- Phylum: Arthropoda
- Class: Insecta
- Order: Lepidoptera
- Family: Lycaenidae
- Genus: Polyommatus
- Species: P. ninae

Binomial name
- Polyommatus ninae (Forster, 1956)

Synonyms
- Agrodiaetus transcaspica ninae Forster, 1956; Agrodiaetus ninae Forster, 1956

Species of butterfly

Polyommatus (Agrodiaetus) ninae, or Nina's blue, is a butterfly of the family Lycaenidae described by Walter Forster in 1956. It is found in Armenia, Azerbaijan, Georgia, eastern Turkey, and northern Iran (Kurdistan).

The wingspan is 28–30 mm. The species inhabits calcareous grasslands and arid mountain steppes, usually dominated by legumes. In Armenia Nina's blue occupies an elevation range from 1500 to 2300 m above sea level. The flight period in Armenia is mainly from late July to late August.

The larvae feed on the Astragalus species A. brachycarpus and A. subrobustus.
