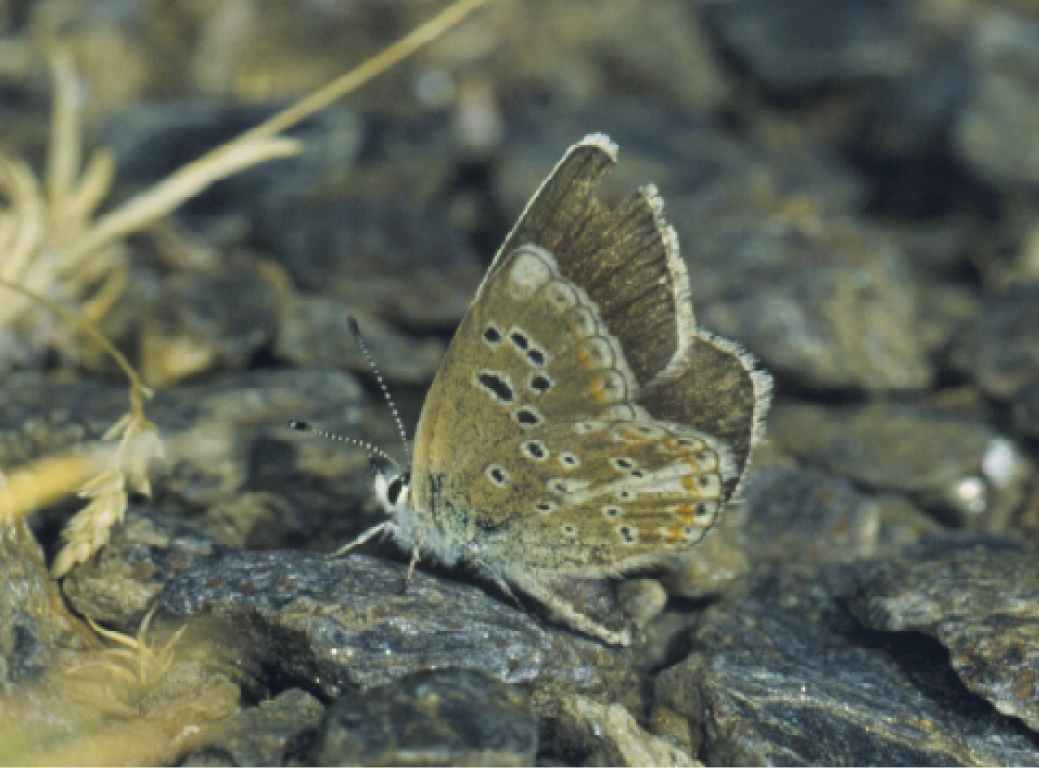

Conservation status
- Vulnerable (IUCN 3.1)

Scientific classification
- Kingdom: Animalia
- Phylum: Arthropoda
- Clade: Pancrustacea
- Class: Insecta
- Order: Lepidoptera
- Family: Lycaenidae
- Genus: Polyommatus
- Species: P. golgus

Binomial name
- Polyommatus golgus (Hübner, 1813)

= Polyommatus golgus =

Species of butterfly

Polyommatus golgus, the Sierra Nevada blue, is a species of butterfly in the family Lycaenidae. It is endemic to Spain with habitat in the Sierra Nevada in Andalusia (Granada and Almería provinces), and is an endangered species.

It is a small butterfly (forewing length is 11 to 16 mm) that has a sexual dimorphism, the upperside of the male is bright blue to light sky blue, that of the female is brown, decorated with a submarginal line of large orange macules. Both sexes have their wings lined with a white fringe. The underside is light ochre to brownish-grey adorned with a submarginal line of white lunula centred by a more or less marked black point and discreetly surrounded by orange. The forewing verso of the male has six to seven postdiscal spots. On the hindwing verso there are from eleven to thirteen spots: two to four basal, one discal and from seven to eight postdiscal. The discal spot is triangular and is almost without black scales in its centre, so that the white area of the spot is quite wide. Submarginal lunules are of pale orange colour, they are variable in number and size and close to them are noticeable black marginal spots.

== Biology ==
The larva feeds on Anthyllis vulneraria pseudoarundana. It flies on dry slopes with sparse vegetation at 2,500-3,200 metres.

== Sources ==
- Polyommatus golgus at Encyclopedia of Life
