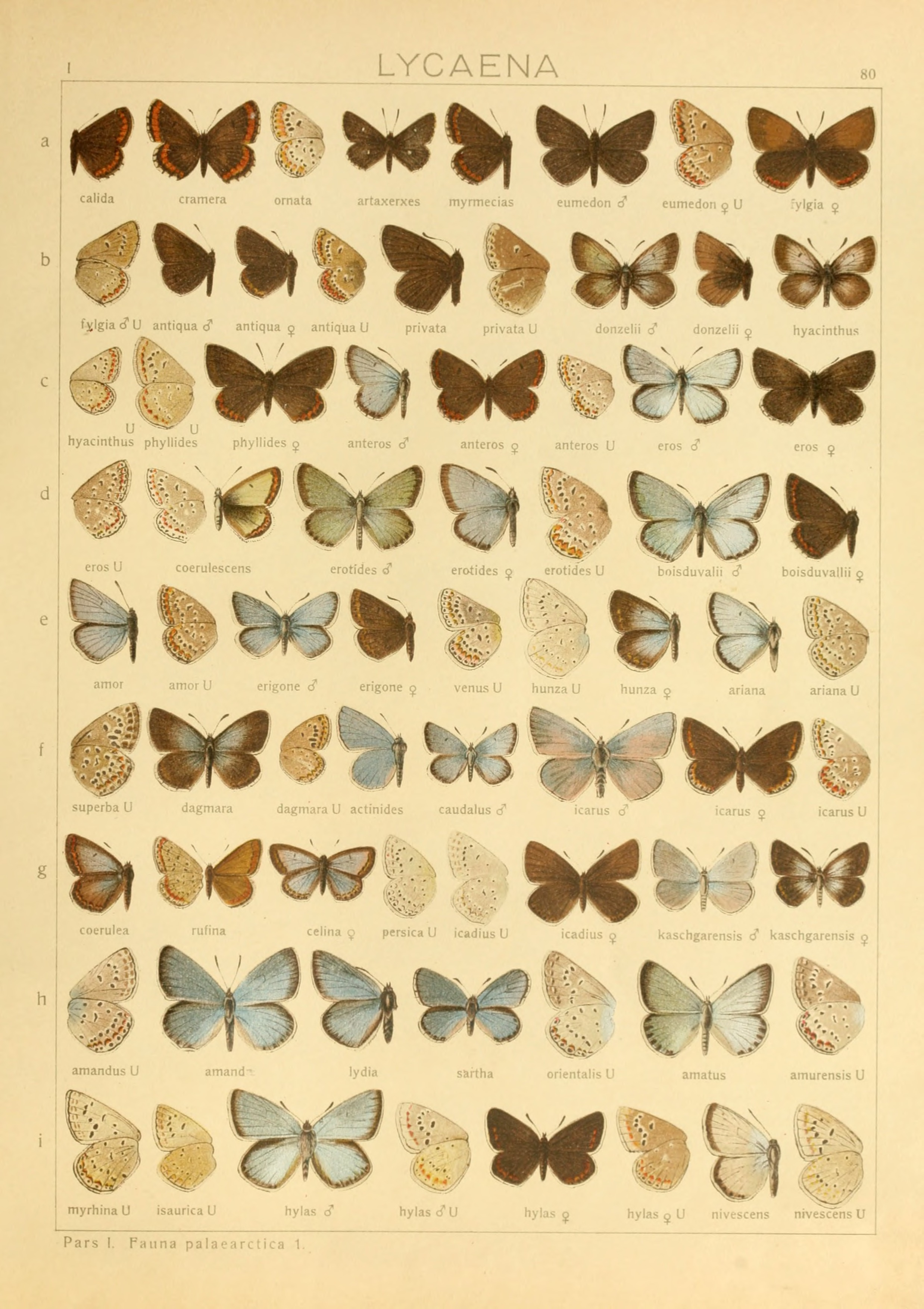
- Seitz plate 80f

Scientific classification
- Kingdom: Animalia
- Phylum: Arthropoda
- Class: Insecta
- Order: Lepidoptera
- Family: Lycaenidae
- Genus: Polyommatus
- Species: P. magnifica

Binomial name
- Polyommatus magnifica (Grum-Grshimailo, 1885)

Synonyms
- Lycaena superba Staudinger, 1887

= Polyommatus magnifica =

Species of butterfly

Polyommatus magnifica is a butterfly in the family Lycaenidae. It was described by Grigory Grum-Grshimailo in 1885. It is found in Ghissar, Alai, and W. Tian-Shan (Gissaro–Alai open woodlands).

L. superba Stgr. (= magnifica Gr.-Grsh.) (80f). A very easily recognized insect, as the brilliant blue colour of the upperside of the male is restricted to the costal and basal areas of the forewing, forming also streaks along the main veins; the hindwing is dark grey and has only when the sun shines upon it a light, grey sheen, which is mainly caused by the hairs. The underside has large ocelli with large pupils, which are partly elongate-ovate. Female above brown, with yellowish red spots anteriorly, at once recognized by the underside. — In the Pamir, caught in June at 6000 ft.
