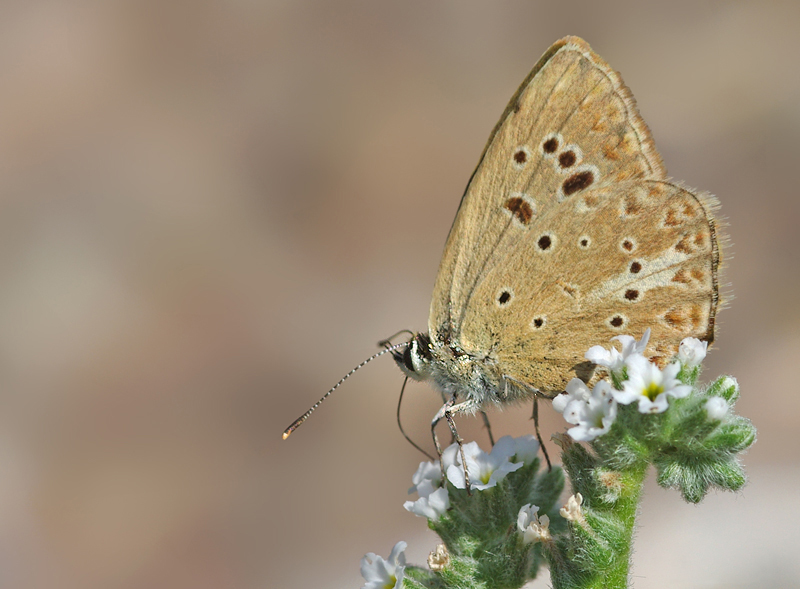

Scientific classification
- Kingdom: Animalia
- Phylum: Arthropoda
- Clade: Pancrustacea
- Class: Insecta
- Order: Lepidoptera
- Family: Lycaenidae
- Genus: Polyommatus
- Species: P. admetus

Binomial name
- Polyommatus admetus (Esper, 1783)

Synonyms
- Papilio admetus Esper, 1783; Agrodiaetus admetus; Agrodiaetus admetus anatoliensis Forster, 1960

= Polyommatus admetus =

Species of butterfly

Polyommatus admetus, the anomalous blue, is a butterfly of the family Lycaenidae. It was described by Eugenius Johann Christoph Esper in 1783. It is found in south-eastern Europe and Turkey.

The wingspan is 30–40 mm. Adults are on wing from June to August.

The larvae feed on Onobrychis species (including O. viciifolia) and Lathyrus species.

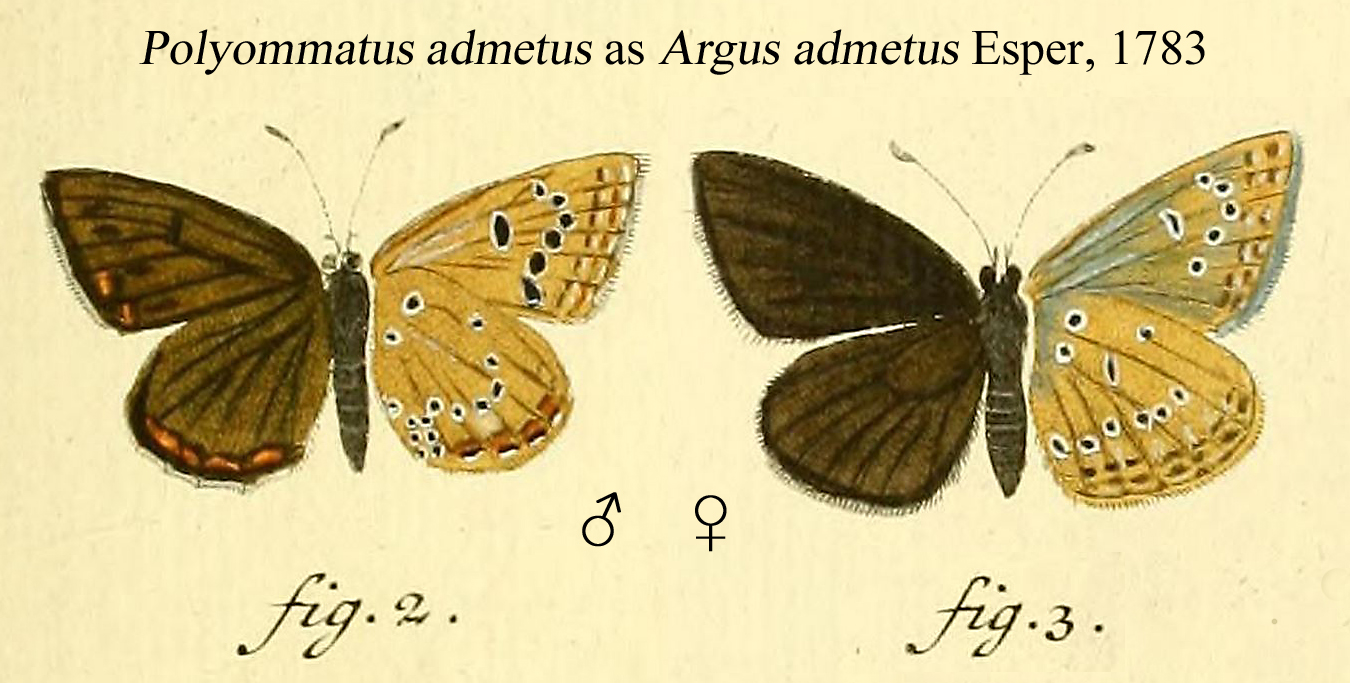
depicted in Esper Europäische Schmetterlinge, Leipzig 1783

== Description from Seitz ==
L. admetus Esp. (81 e). Male and female above dull dark brown, without metallic blue or aeneous gloss; the discocellular spot of the forewing and the black veins mostly distinctly contrasting. The hindwing, especially of the female, often bears obsolete reddish anal spots. The underside is somewhat paler brown than the upper, with distinct ocelli but no basal ocelli on the forewing. In South-East Europe, from Hungary and Galicia through the Balkan Peninsula and Asia Minor to Mesopotamia, and also in Spain. — ripartii Frr. (81 f), has a white mesial streak on the hindwing below, which extends from the base to the outer margin. More widely distributed than admetus, found in the Alps, South France, Eastern Europe, Asia Minor, Persia and Turkestan. — The egg is greenish at first, but later on, it is white. Larva on Onobrychis cristagalli. The butterflies are on the wing in June and July and fly on slopes with sparse vegetation, settling particularly on lavender. They are plentiful in most places where they occur.

== Subspecies ==
- Polyommatus admetus admetus (south-eastern Europe)
- Polyommatus admetus anatoliensis (Forster, 1960) (Turkey)
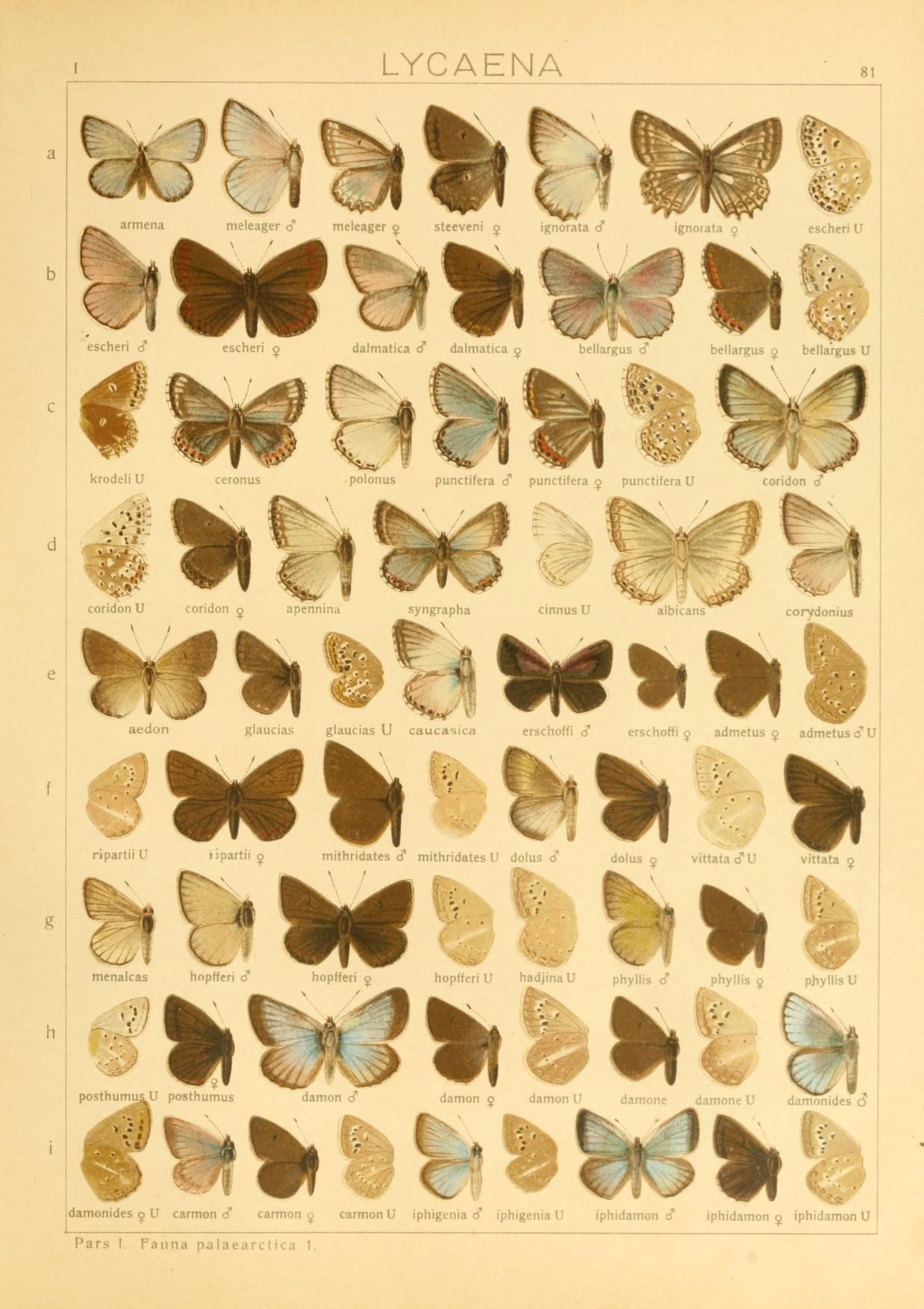
81e, f

== Etymology ==
Named in the Classical tradition. In Greek mythology, Admetus of Pherae was a friend of Hercules.
