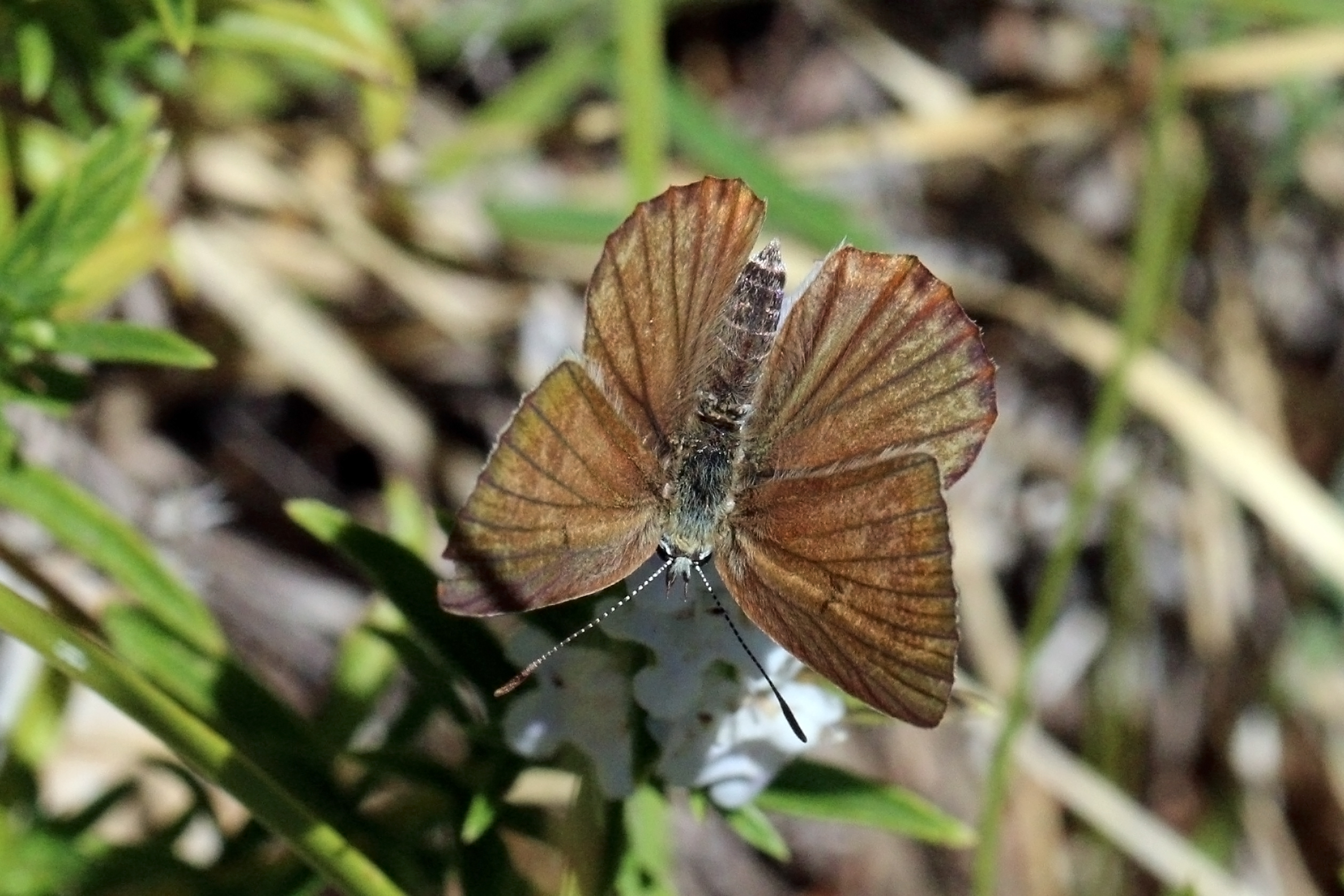

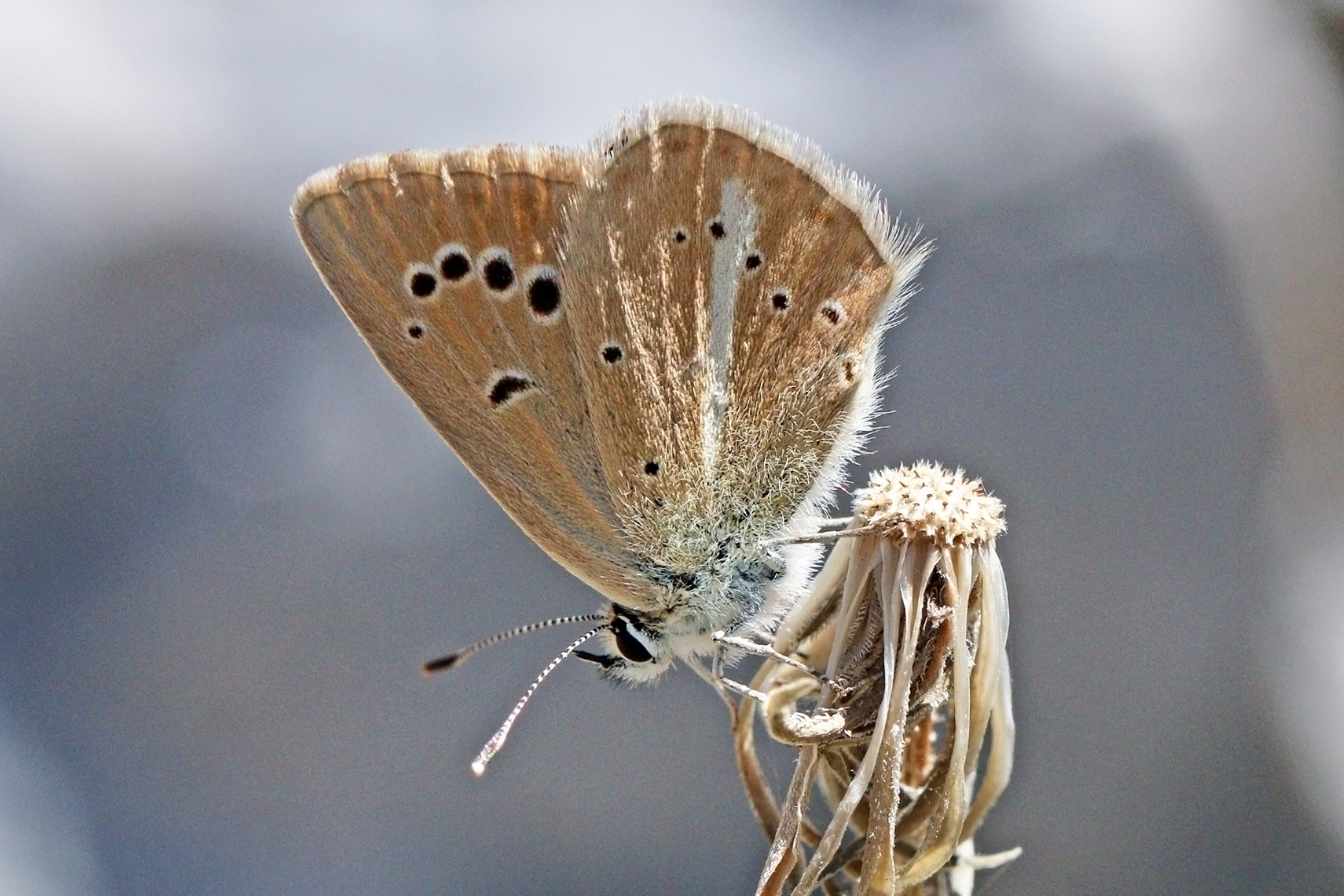
- Both in North Macedonia

Scientific classification
- Kingdom: Animalia
- Phylum: Arthropoda
- Class: Insecta
- Order: Lepidoptera
- Family: Lycaenidae
- Genus: Polyommatus
- Species: P. ripartii

Binomial name
- Polyommatus ripartii (Freyer, 1830)

Synonyms
- Polyommatus (Agrodiaetus) ripartii

= Ripart's anomalous blue =

Species of butterfly

Ripart's anomalous blue (Polyommatus ripartii) is a butterfly in the family Lycaenidae.

It is found in Southern Europe, Greece and the Balkans, Asia Minor and the Crimea, South-West Siberia, the Altai Mountains and Kazakhstan. Flies in high summer, July to August in hot dry grassy places and slopes with flowers

It now includes the former Agrodiaetus galloi (Italy), Agrodiaetus exuberans (Italy), and Agrodiaetus agenjoi (Spain), which used to be considered endemic species with highly restricted distribution ranges, but were then shown to be local populations of P. ripartii. It is very similar to Polyommatus admetus and Seitz regards it as a form of admetus - ripartii Frr. (81 f), but has on the hindwing below a white mesial streak which extends from the base to the outer margin.

Its Polish population is considered one of the most endangered butterflies in central Europe.

== Etymology ==
The butterfly is named after the French butterfly collector Rippert de Beaugency (1794–1875).

== Gallery ==
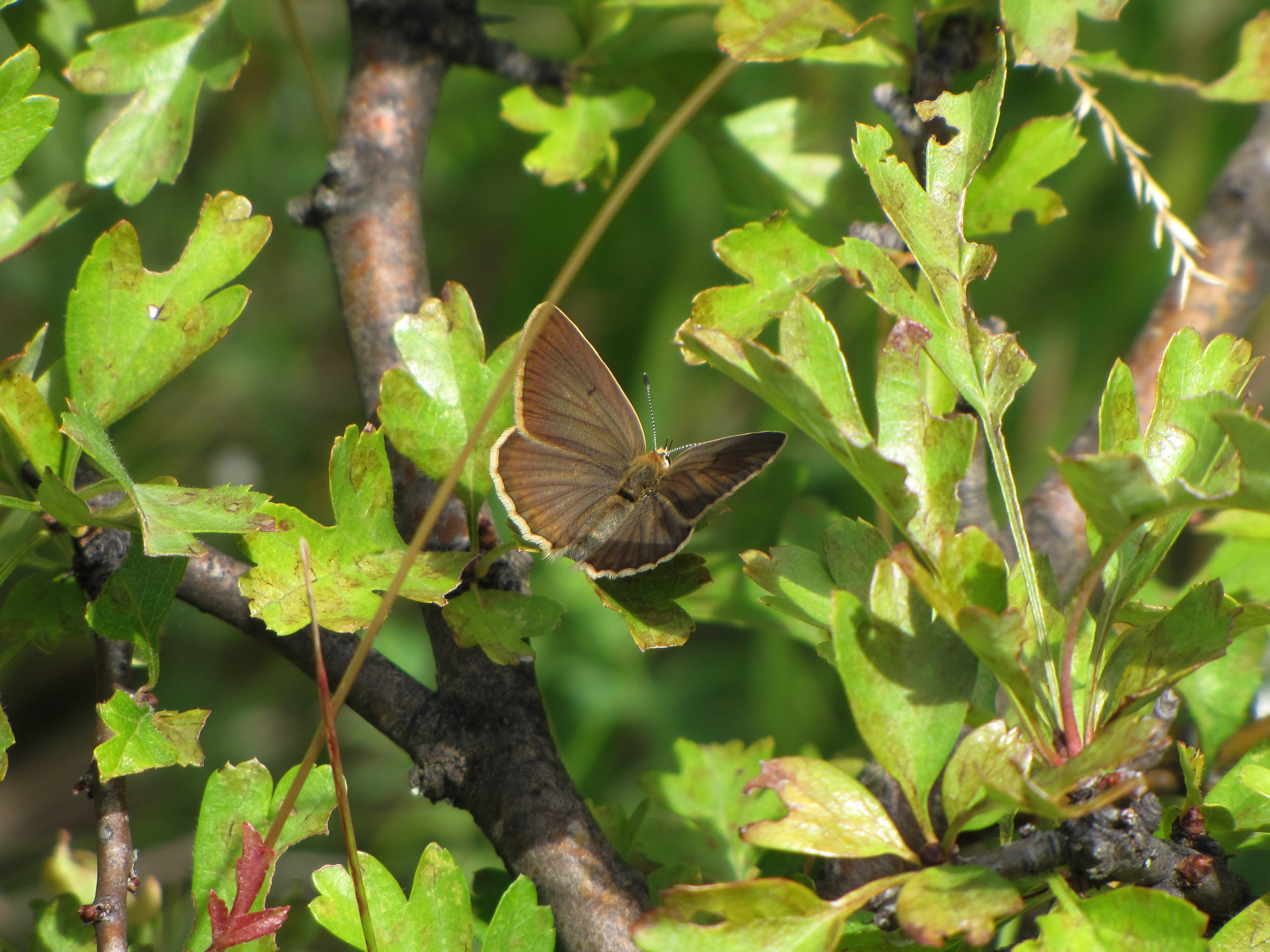

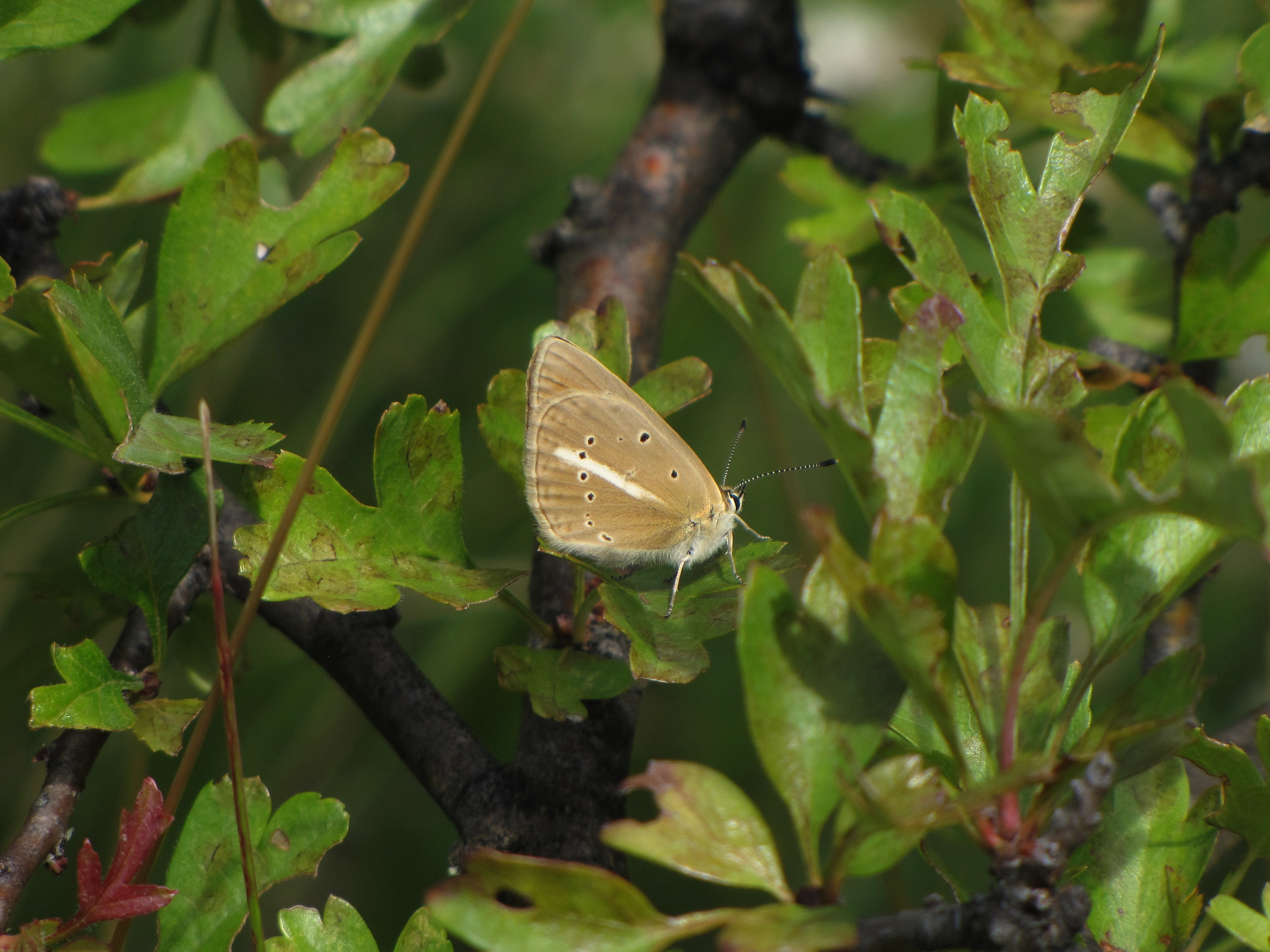

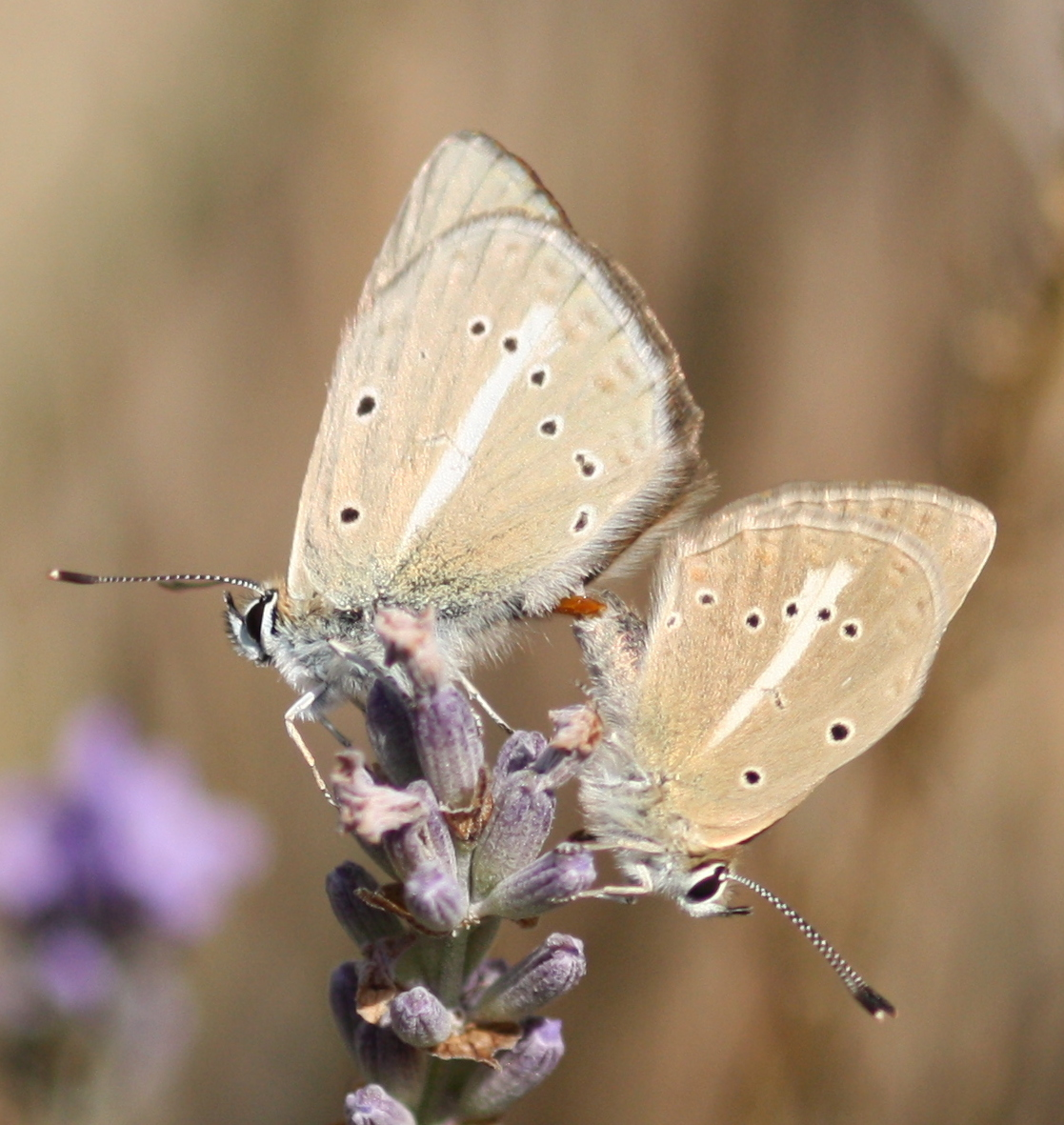
mating

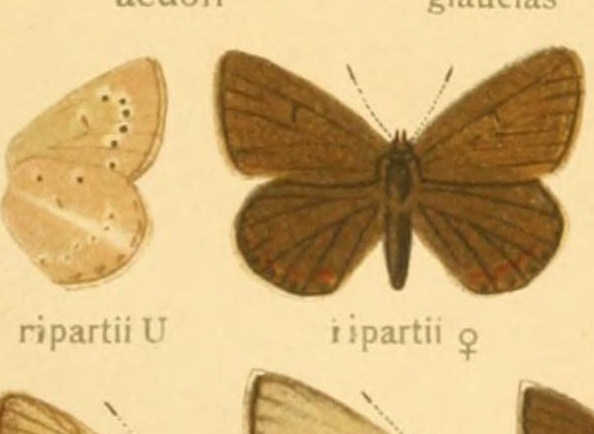
figure from Seitz
