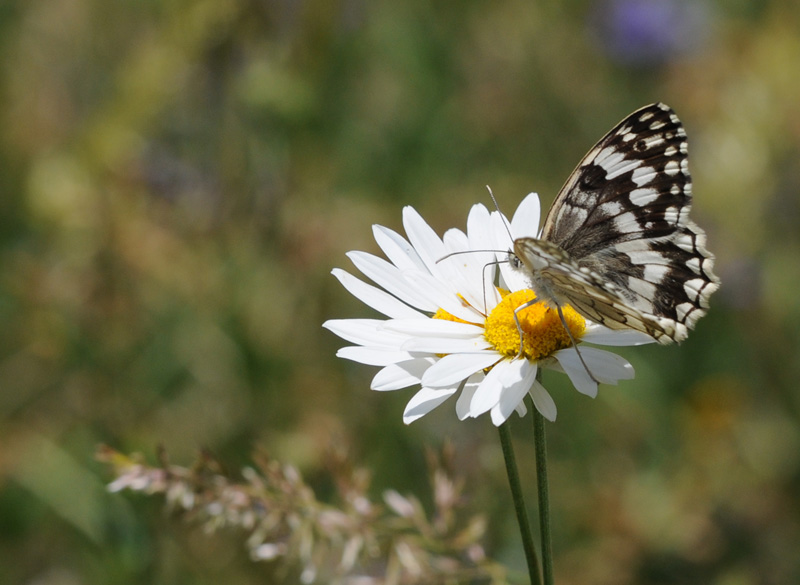

Scientific classification
- Kingdom: Animalia
- Phylum: Arthropoda
- Class: Insecta
- Order: Lepidoptera
- Family: Nymphalidae
- Genus: Melanargia
- Species: M. larissa

Binomial name
- Melanargia larissa (Geyer, 1828)

Synonyms
- Papilio larissa Geyer, [1828]; Melanargia titania Calberla, 1891; Melanargia standfussi Wagener, 1983; Melanargia grumi Standfuss, 1892; Melanargia syriaca Oberthür, 1894; Papilio hylata Ménétriés, 1832; Melanargia iranica Seitz, 1907; Melanargia massageta Staudinger, 1901; Melanargia taurica Röber, 1896; Melanargia titea Klug, 1832

= Melanargia larissa =

Balkan marbled white

Species of butterfly

Melanargia larissa, the Balkan marbled white, is a butterfly in the family Nymphalidae. It is found from south-eastern Europe (Croatia, Serbia, Albania, Bulgaria, Greece) and Asia Minor to Transcaucasia and north-western Iran. The habitat consists of dry grasslands, scrubby hillsides and grassy woodland glades. Adults are on wing from mid-May to July in one generation per year.

The wingspan is about 52 mm. The nymotypical form larissa Hbn. (38f) is easily recognized by the strongly sooty blackening of the bases of the wings, only the cell having some light places left. The forms allied to larissa can be separated from the japygia- forms only withdifficulty and some arbitrariness. The transverse cell-bar of the forewing is not so close to the centre of the cell, being apparently a little shifted towards the apex of the same, and the median band of the hindwing has a somewhat different position, but also varies rather considerably. The countries inhabited by the forms of larissa are more or less grouped around the Black Sea, while the distribution area of the japygia -forms encircles that of larissa in a wide arch.

The larvae feed on Brachypodium species.

== Subspecies ==
- Melanargia larissa larissa
- Melanargia larissa grumi Standfuss, 1892
- Melanargia larissa hylata (Ménétriés, 1832) (Turkey and Iran)
- Melanargia larissa iranica Seitz, 1907
- Melanargia larissa karabagi Koçak, 1976 (Turkey)
- Melanargia larissa kocaki Wagener, 1983
- Melanargia larissa lorestanensis Carbonell & Naderi, 2007
- Melanargia larissa massageta Staudinger, 1901
- Melanargia larissa syriaca Oberthur, 1894
- Melanargia larissa taurica Rober, 1896
- Melanargia larissa titea Klug, 1832
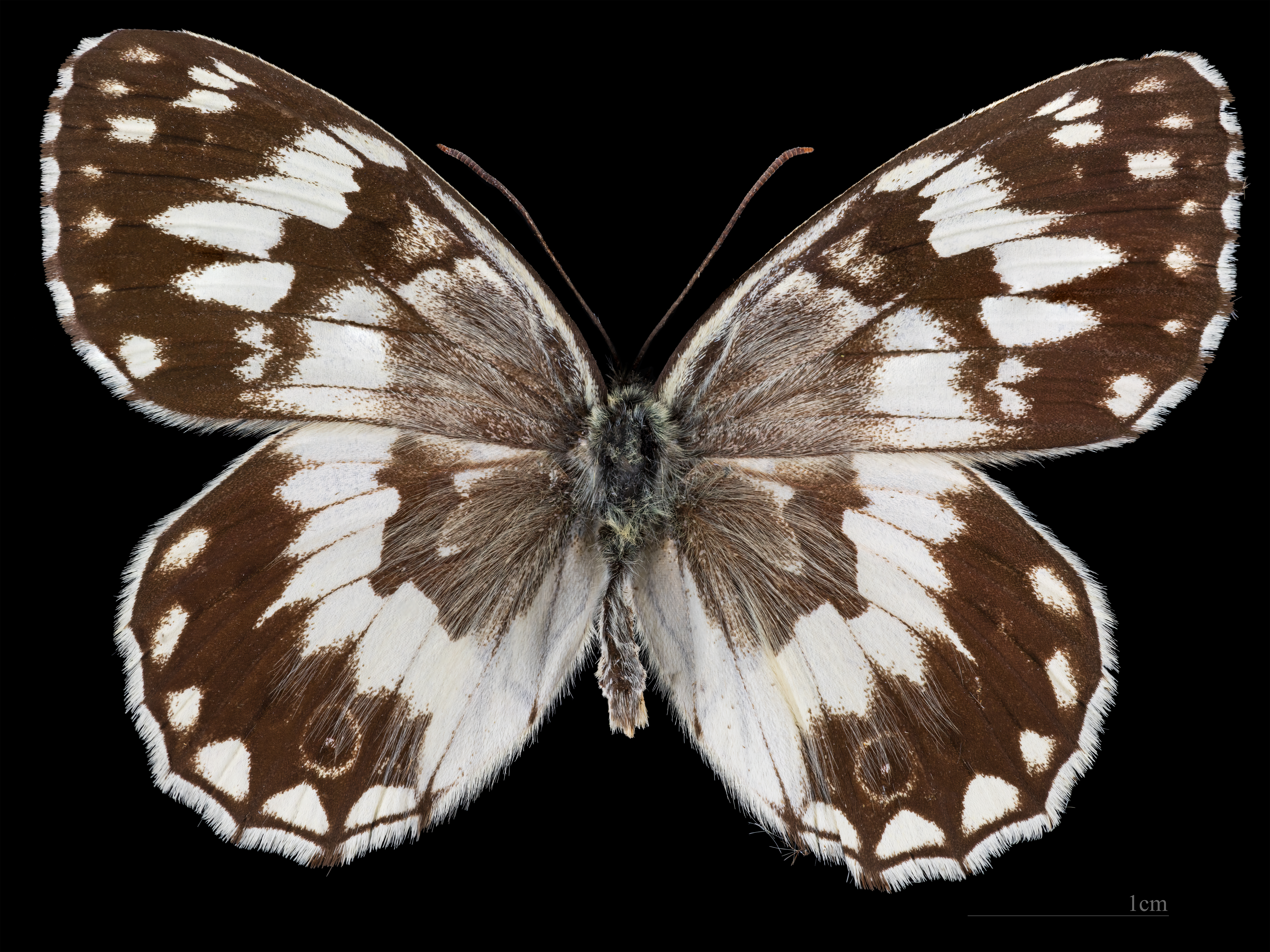
Melanargia larissa ♂

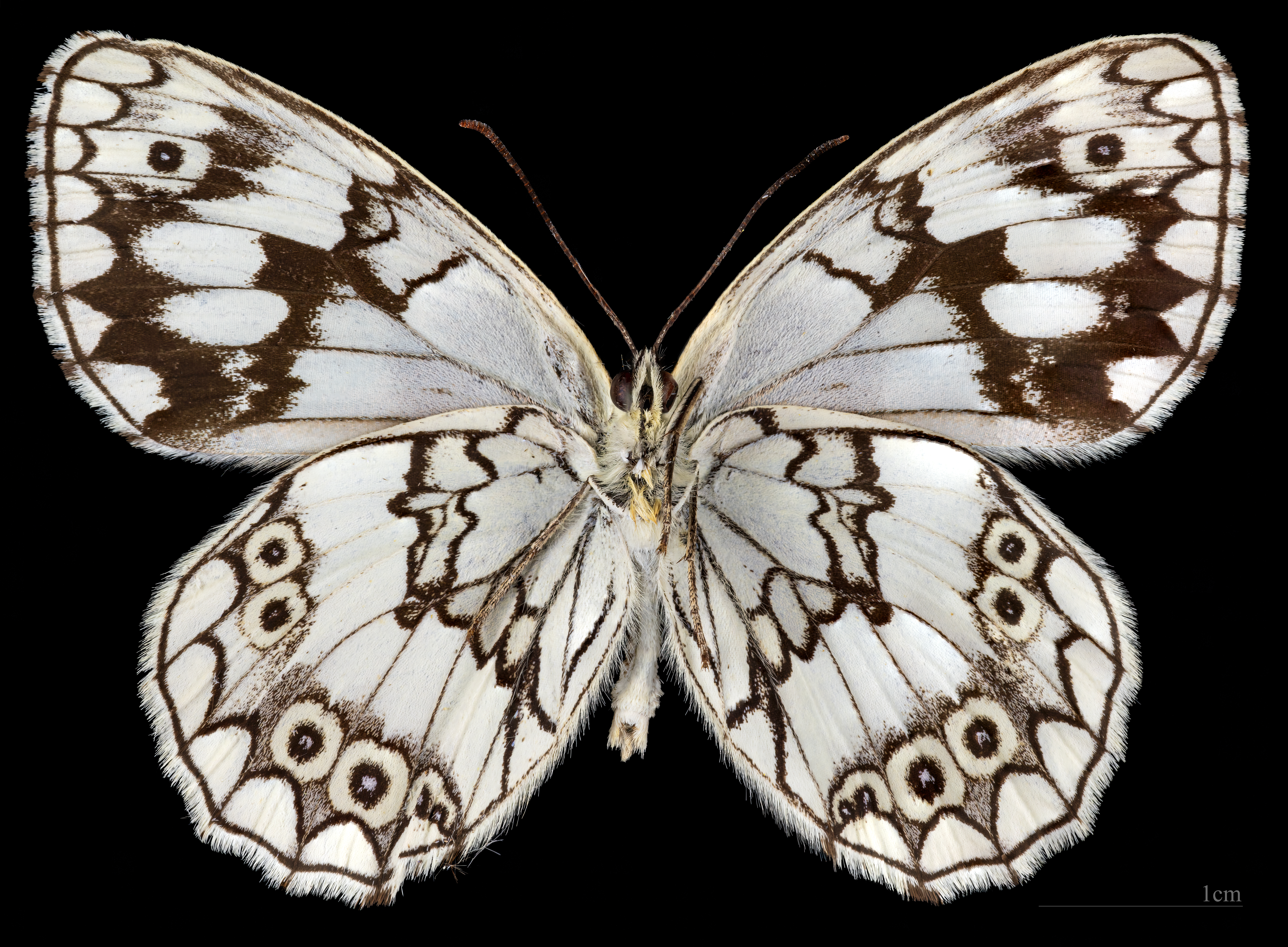
Melanargia larissa ♂ △

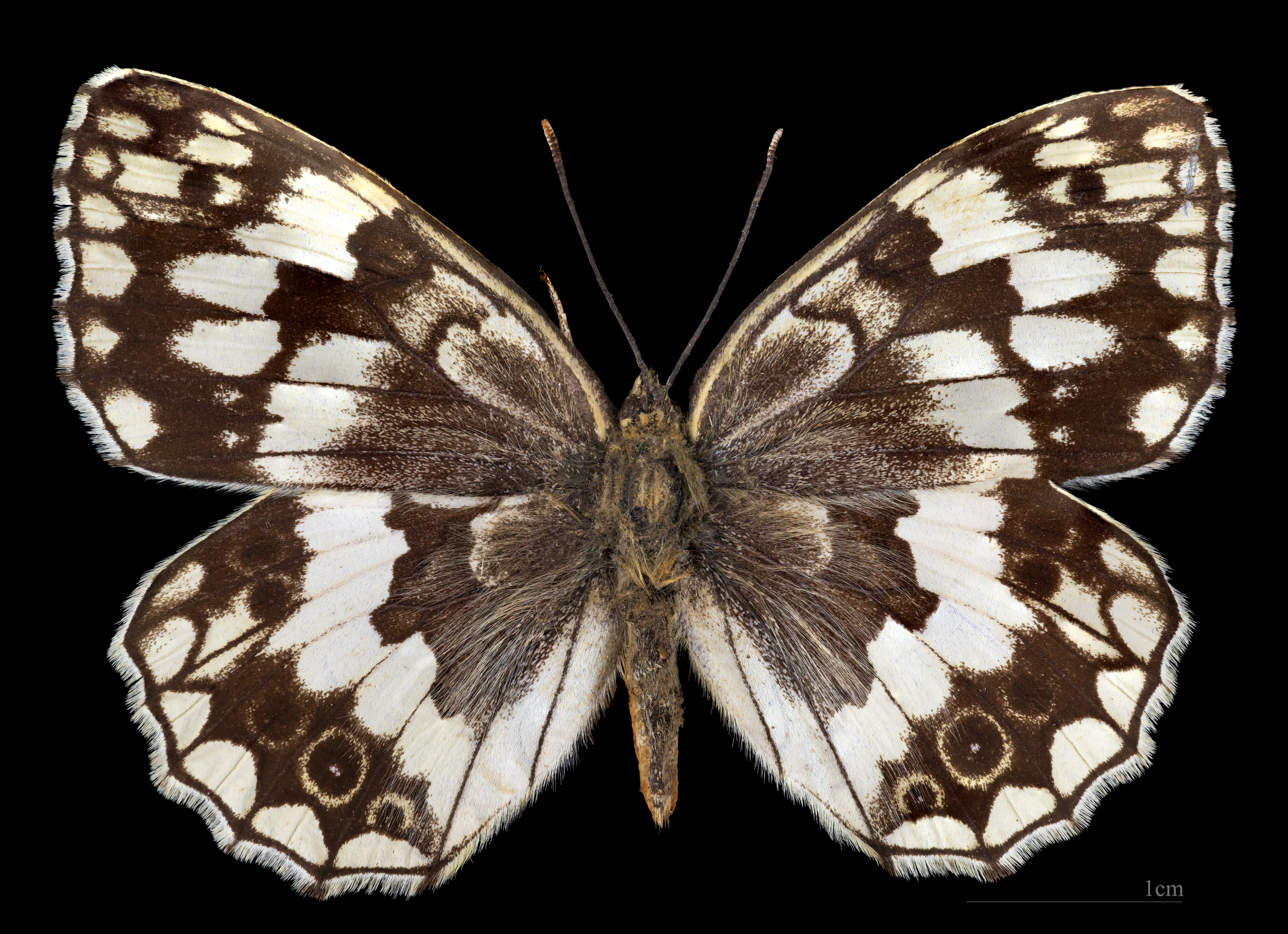
Melanargia larissa ♀

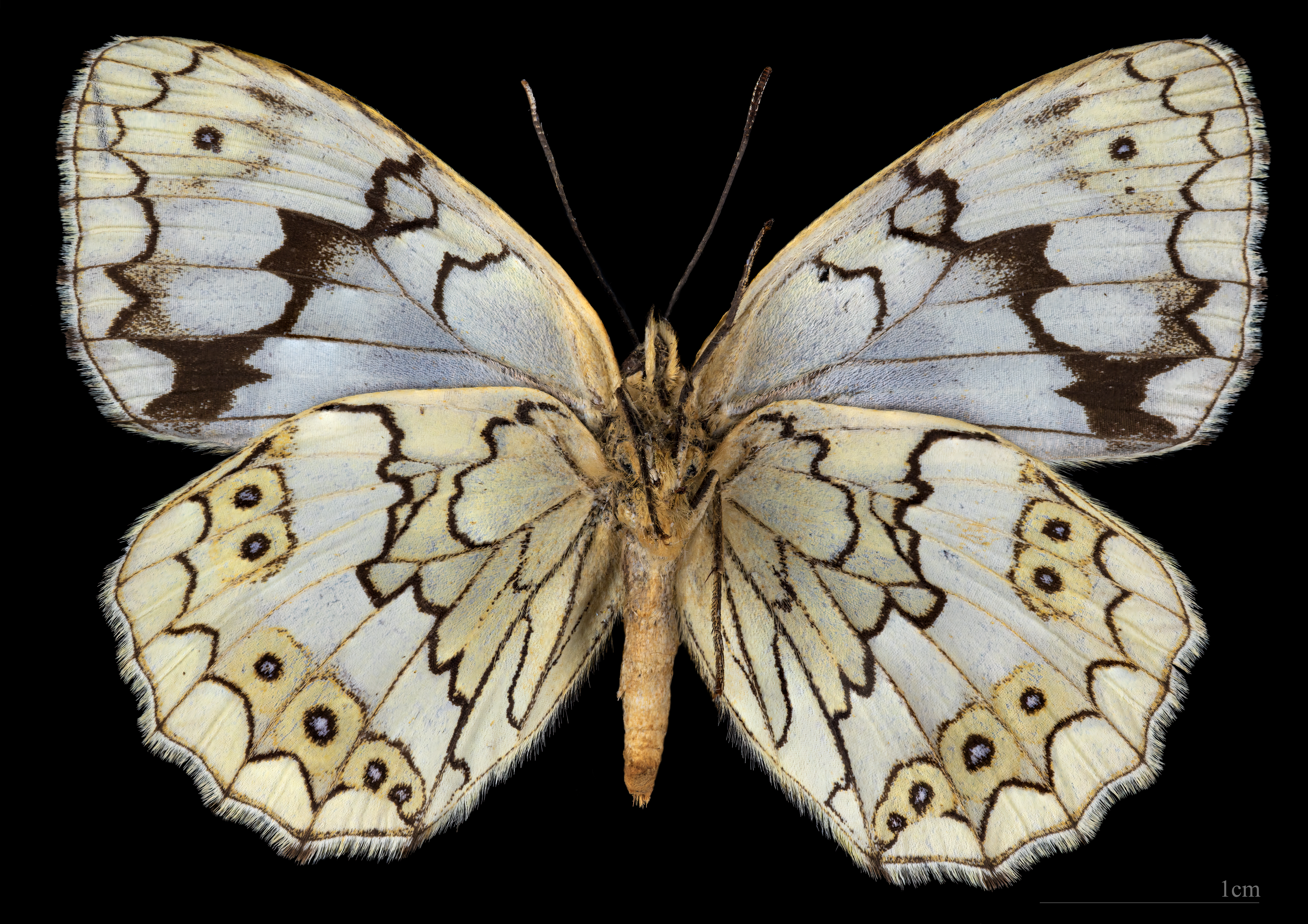
Melanargia larissa ♀ △

== Etymology ==
Larissa (Greek) - Larissa, a city in Thessaly
