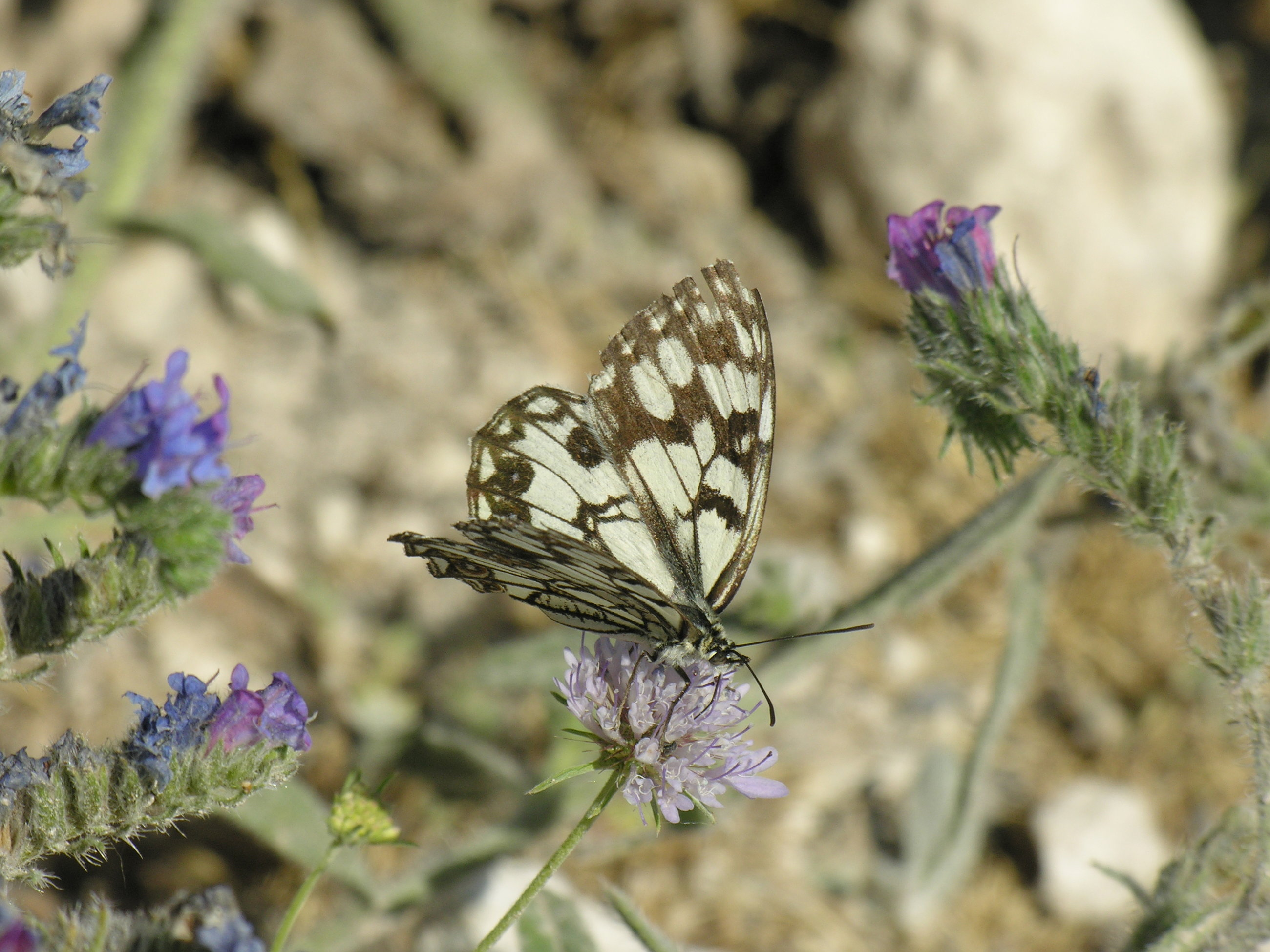

Scientific classification
- Kingdom: Animalia
- Phylum: Arthropoda
- Clade: Pancrustacea
- Class: Insecta
- Order: Lepidoptera
- Family: Nymphalidae
- Genus: Melanargia
- Species: M. ines

Binomial name
- Melanargia ines Hoffmannsegg, 1804

Synonyms
- Papilio ines Hoffmannsegg, 1804; Melanargia maura Turati 1934; Satyrus sagarraria Querci, 1948; Melanargia semireducta Houlbert 1923.

= Melanargia ines =

Species of butterfly

Melanargia ines, the Spanish marbled white, is a butterfly species belonging to the family Nymphalidae. It can be found on the Iberian Peninsula and western North Africa.

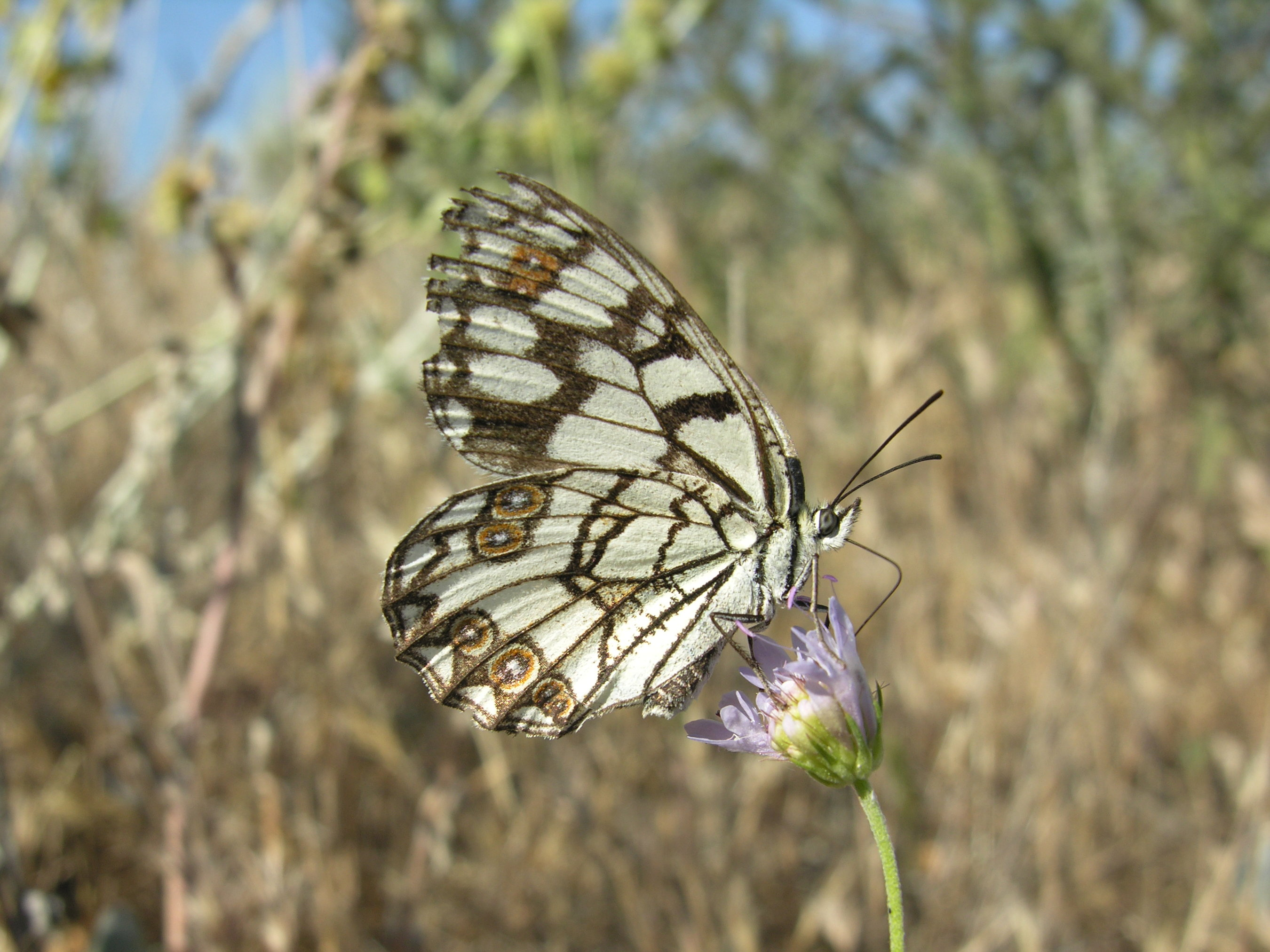

The length of the forewings is 23–25 mm. Seitz- M. ines Hoffgg. (— thetis Hbn.) (39 e). Above similar to syllius, but the short transverse band of the forewing heavily black, placed exactly in the centre of the cell and not united with the black discocellular spot. On the hindwing beneath the ocelli are magnificently coloured, the sky-blue centre being successively encircled by russet-red, yellow and lilac rings, the costal ocelli of the upperside being always centred with blue.

Found on stony heights which are almost bare of vegetation excepting flowers. Abundant. The butterflies fly in one generation from May to June.

The larvae feed on various grasses such as Brachypodium pinnatum and Bromus madritensis.
