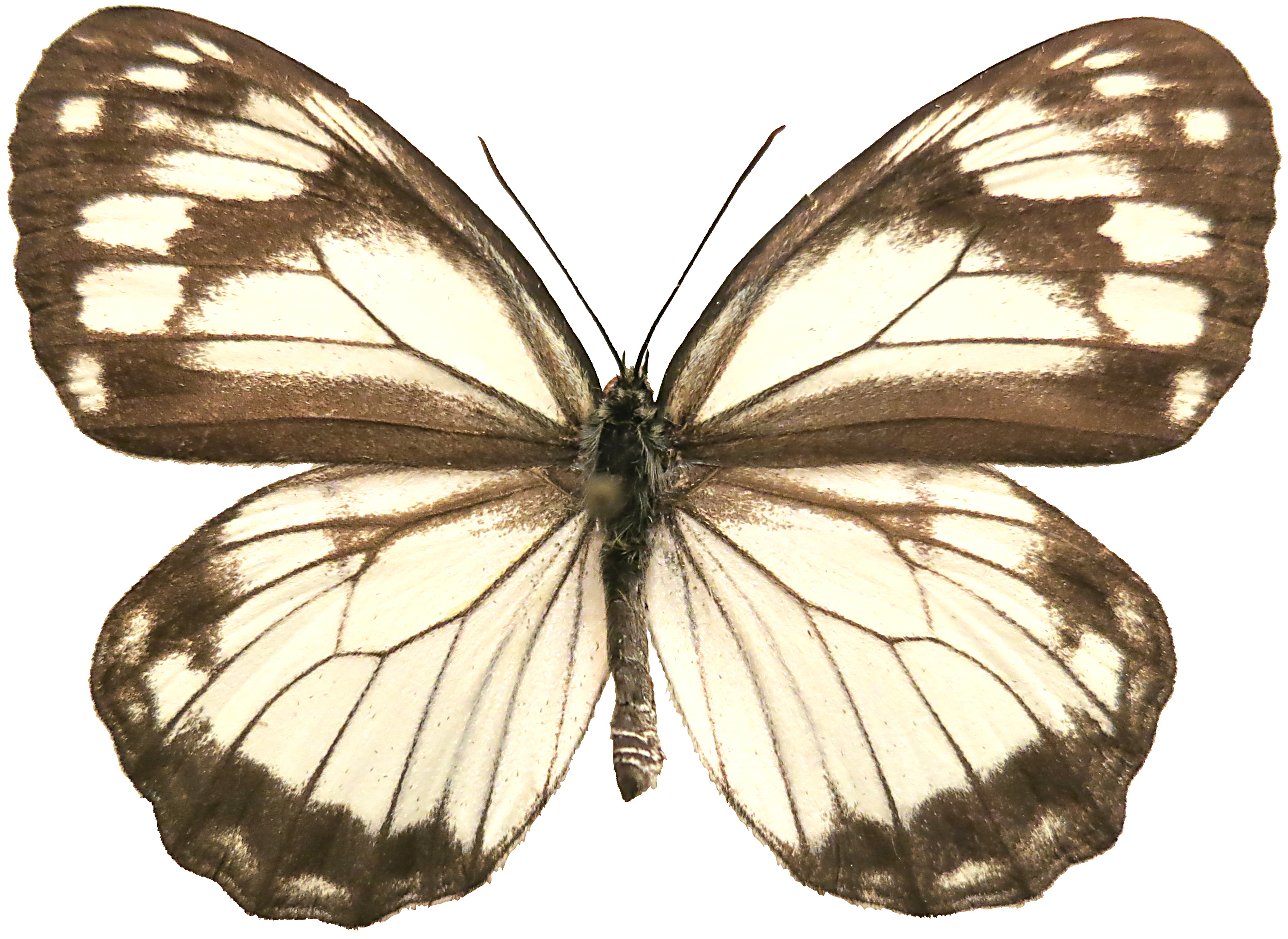
- M. epimede - Koksharovka, Cheguyevsky District, Russia

Scientific classification
- Domain: Eukaryota
- Kingdom: Animalia
- Phylum: Arthropoda
- Class: Insecta
- Order: Lepidoptera
- Family: Nymphalidae
- Genus: Melanargia
- Species: M. epimede

Binomial name
- Melanargia epimede Staudinger, 1892

Synonyms
- Melanargia meridionalis var. epimede Staudinger, 1892

= Melanargia epimede =

Species of butterfly

Melanargia epimede is an east Palaearctic species of satyrine butterfly found in eastern Mongolia, northeastern China, Korea and Japan. The larva on feeds on Agrostis clavata.

Description in Seitz: "meridionalis Fldr. (= epimede Stgr. (39 c) is a large form which is broadly black above and appears to occur chiefly at Ning-po and Kiu-kiang. The ocelli of the underside especially are enormously developed. — An aberration which is melanotic on both surfaces, bearing only reduced whitish smears between the veins on the otherwise quite dark wings, is ab. lugens Honr. (39 d); it is known from Central China."
