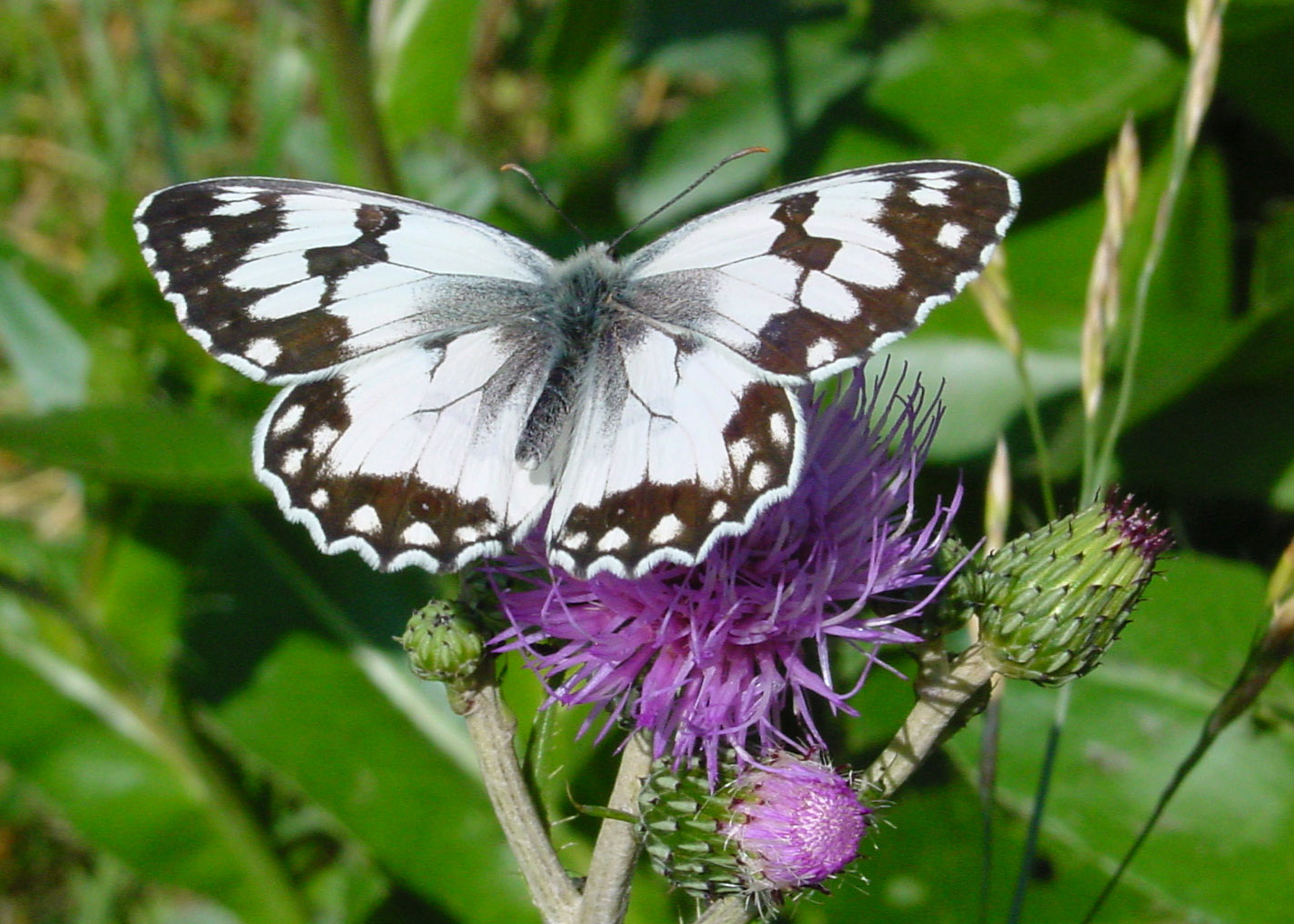

Conservation status
- Least Concern (IUCN 3.1)

Scientific classification
- Kingdom: Animalia
- Phylum: Arthropoda
- Clade: Pancrustacea
- Class: Insecta
- Order: Lepidoptera
- Family: Nymphalidae
- Genus: Melanargia
- Species: M. lachesis

Binomial name
- Melanargia lachesis Hübner, 1790

Synonyms
- Melanargia lachesis (Hubner, 1790); Papilio lachesis Hübner, 1790; Lachesis ruscinonensis Oberthür & Houlbert, 1922; Melanargia galathea lachesis; Melanargia ampliusangulata Bryk 1940; Melanargia catalana de Sagarra 1926; Melanargia chlorinda Oberthür 1936; Melanargia semi-cataleuca Varin 1955

= Melanargia lachesis =

Species of butterfly

Melanargia lachesis, the Iberian marbled white, is a butterfly species belonging to the family Nymphalidae.

== Distribution ==
It can be found on the Iberian Peninsula and the south of France.

== Description ==
The length of the forewings is 25–28 mm. Seitz- M. lachesis Hbn. (= nemausica Esp.) (38b). Lighter than galathea, even than the lightest forms of the same. The black discocellular anguliform spot of the forewing constricted where it is bent. Hindwing entirely white, apart from the interrupted submarginal band; the base very sparingly dusted, the markings of the underside however shine through in the male. In Spain, Portugal and South France. – The specimens with creamy yellow ground-colour, which are somewhat rarer than the chalky white canigulensis Obth.; from the Pyrenees.

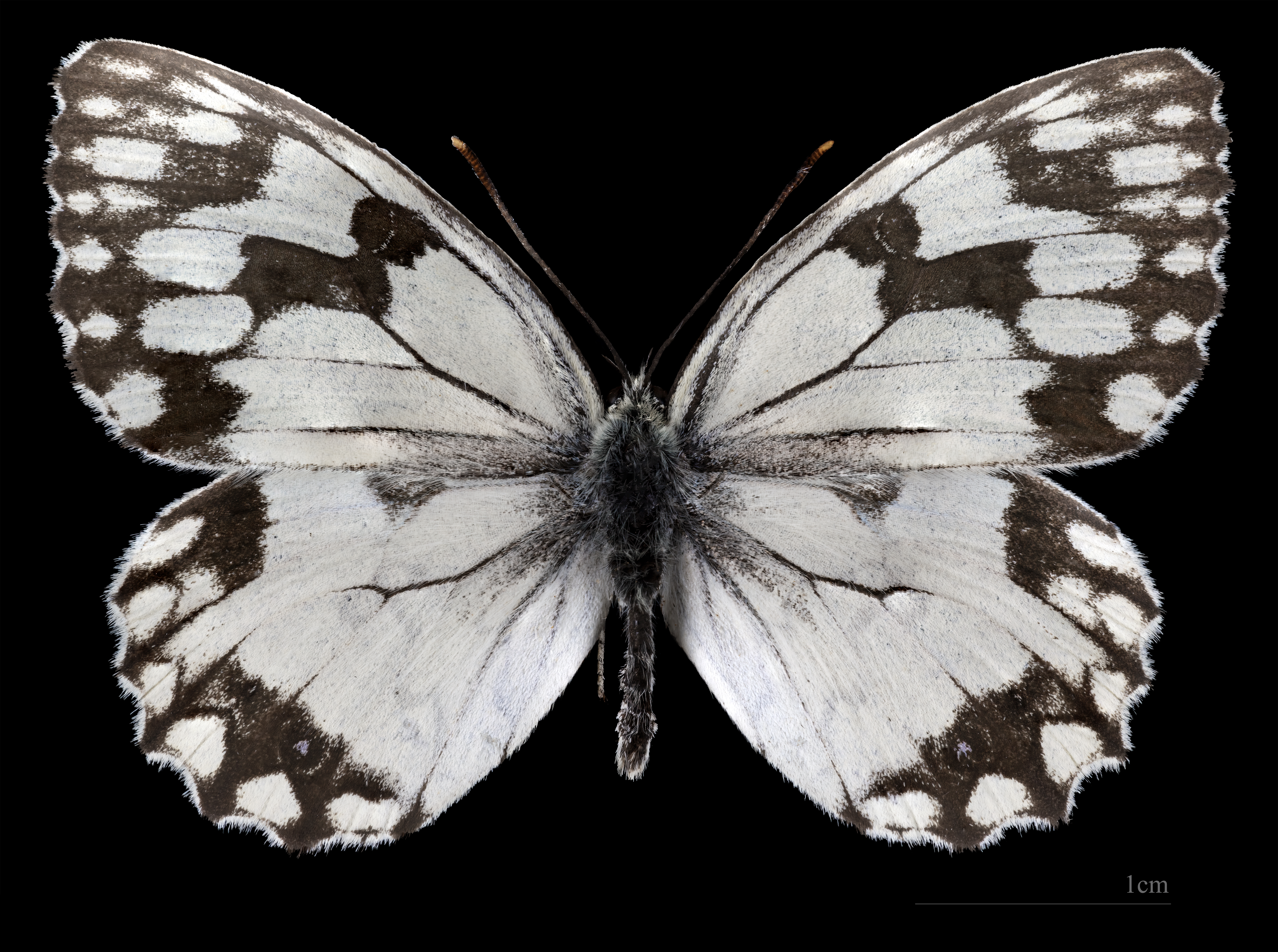
Melanargia lachesis ♂

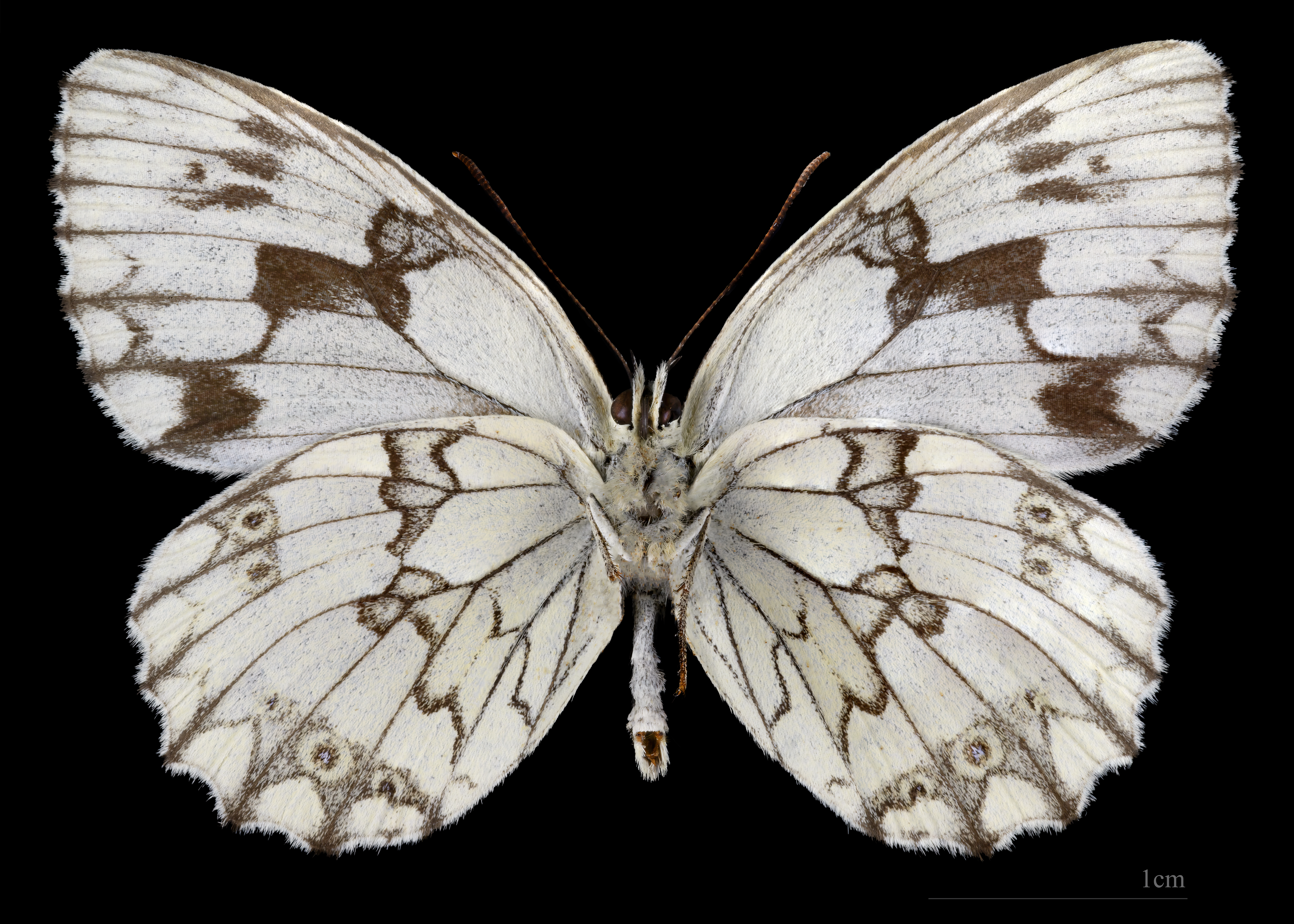
Melanargia lachesis ♂ △

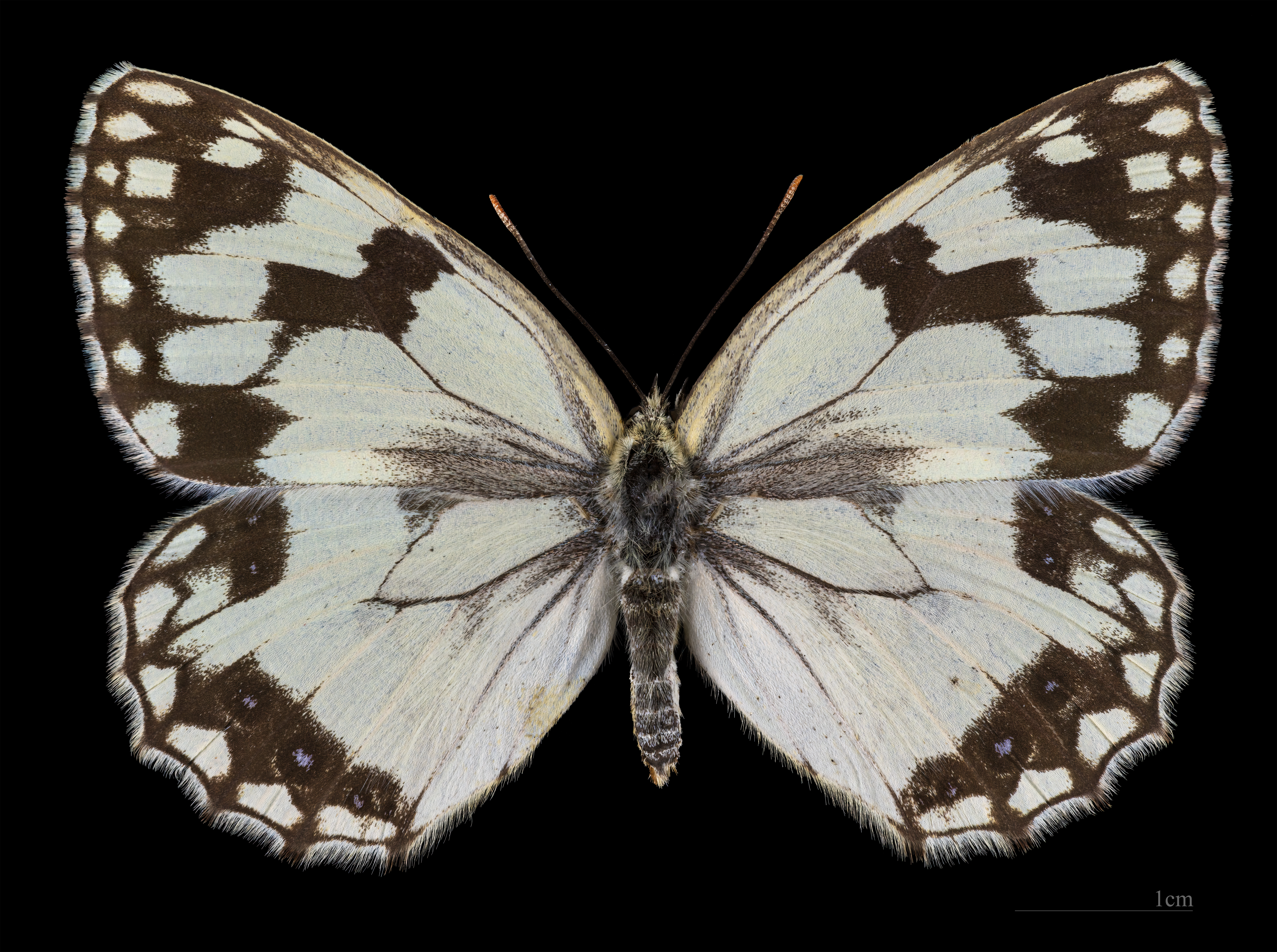
Melanargia lachesis ♀

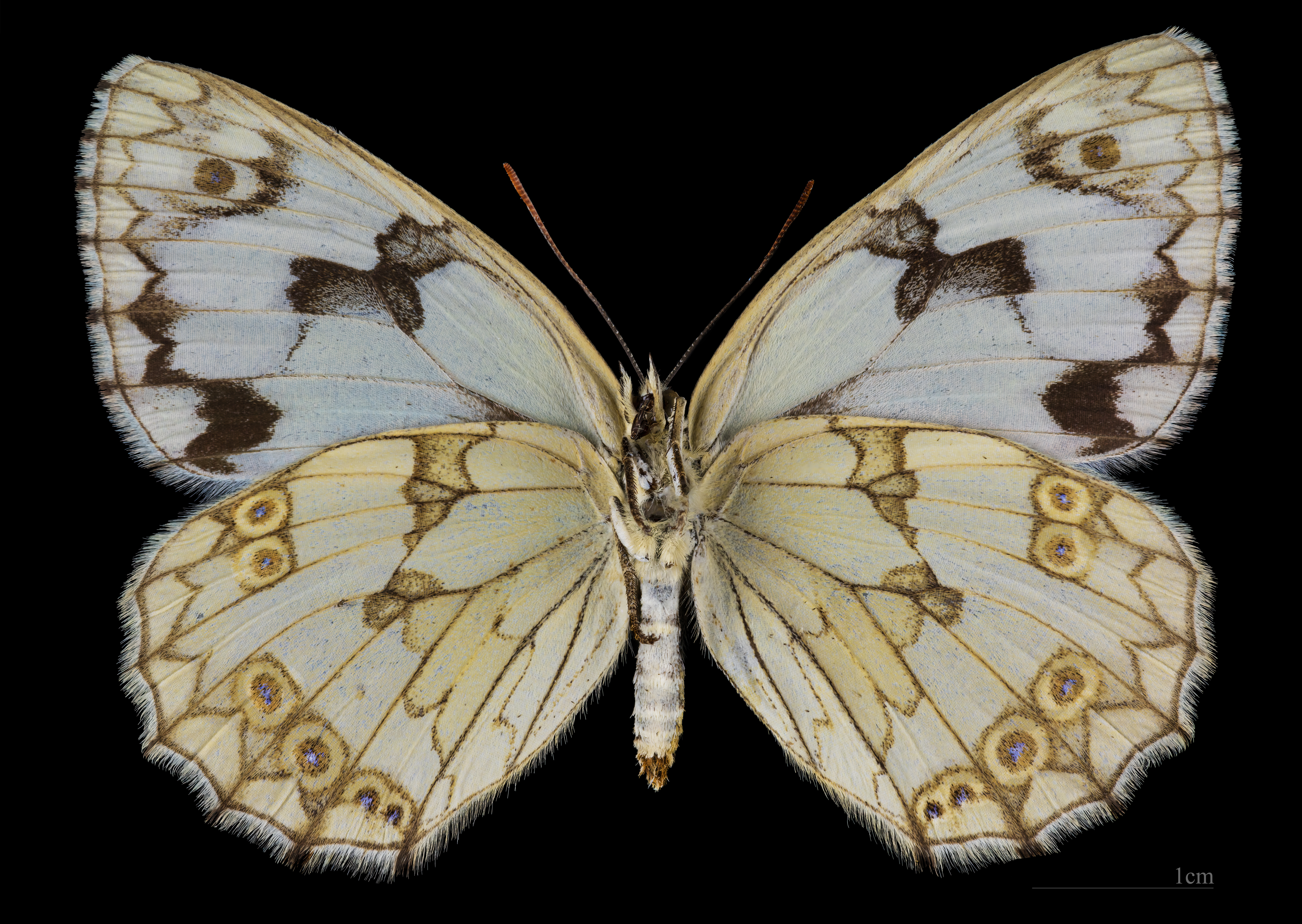
Melanargia lachesis ♀ △

== Biology ==
The butterflies fly in one generation from June to August.They occur from the plain to about 1,600 meters above sea level. They prefer dry, flowering, natural meadows that can also be overgrown with bushes. The larvae feed on various grasses.
