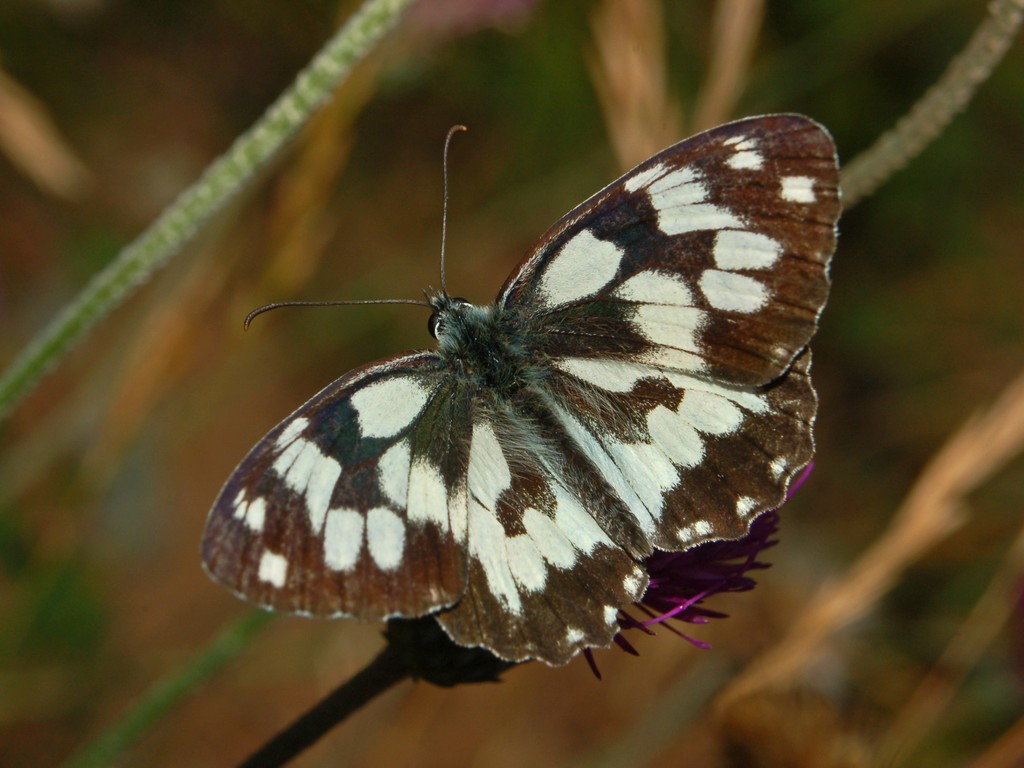
- Melanargia galathea, dorsal view

Scientific classification
- Kingdom: Animalia
- Phylum: Arthropoda
- Clade: Pancrustacea
- Class: Insecta
- Order: Lepidoptera
- Family: Nymphalidae
- Subfamily: Satyrinae
- Tribe: Satyrini
- Subtribe: Melanargiina; Wheeler, 1903
- Genus: Melanargia; Meigen, 1828

Synonyms
- Agapetes Billberg, 1820; Arge Hübner, 1819; Ledargia Houlbert, 1922; Epimede Houlbert, 1922; Parce Oberthür & Houlbert, 1922; Halimede Oberthür et Houlbert, 1922; Lachesis Oberthür & Houlbert, 1922

= Melanargia =

Genus of brush-footed butterflies

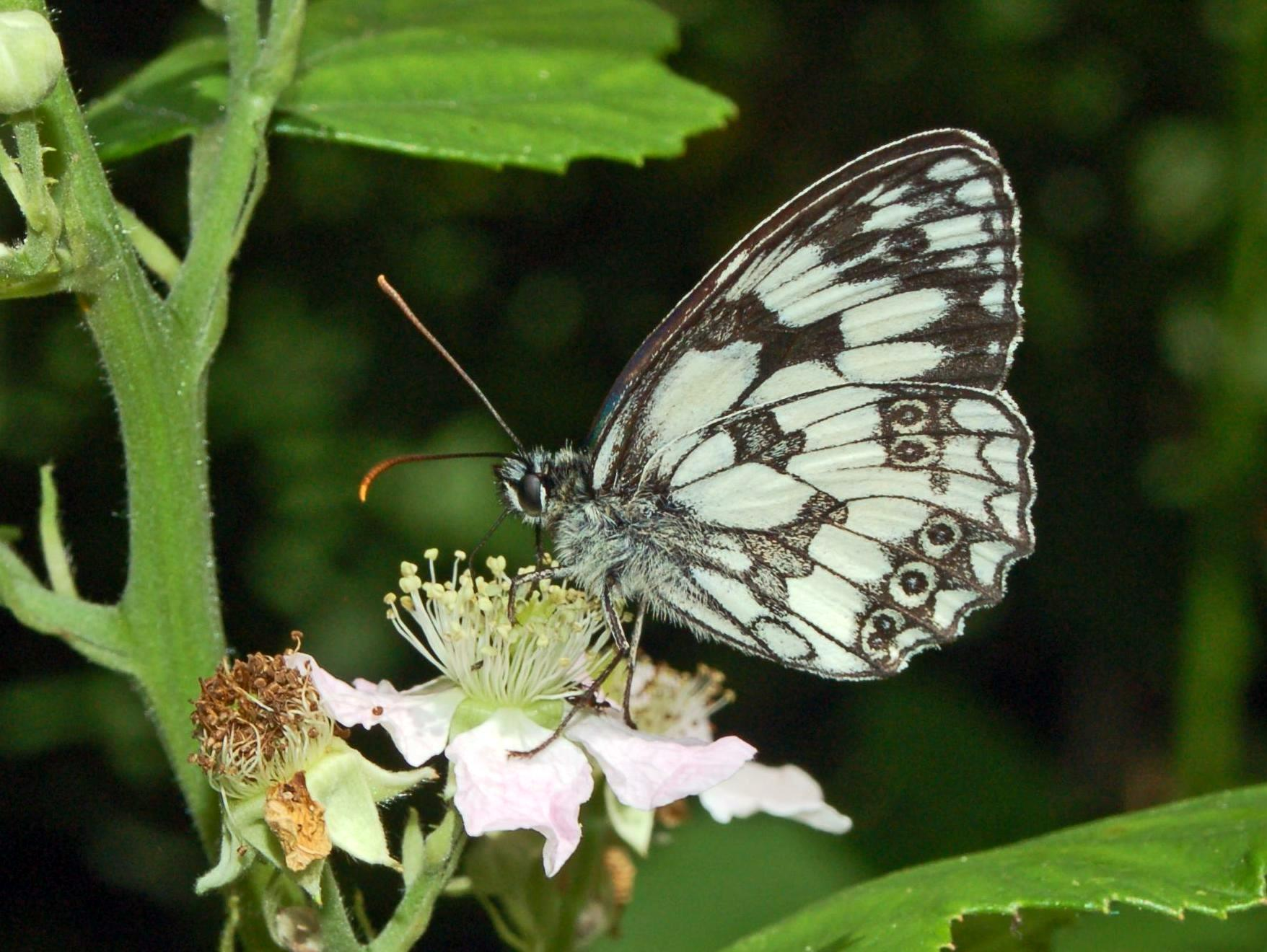
Melanargia galathea, lateral view

Melanargia is a genus of butterflies belonging to the family Nymphalidae and the subfamily Satyrinae (formerly family Satyridae).

This genus, described by Johann Wilhelm Meigen in 1828, is the only genus in the subtribe Melanargiina, Wheeler, 1903.

The adults of this genus of satyrines are easily distinguished by their white wings with black veins and markings (hence the common name "marbled whites"). A peculiar phenotypic distinctiveness is also a dilated vein 12 at the base of the forewing.

Butterflies of genus Melanargia are widespread from Europe and north Africa to Japan.

== Species and subspecies ==
The investigations on genetic divergence and phylogenetic relationships among Melanargia species have recognized three subgenera (Melanargia, Argeformia, and Halimede) and reclassified the genus in 20 species and relevant subspecies as follows:

Subgenus Melanargia (Meigen, 1829)

- Melanargia galathea (Linnaeus, 1758) - marbled white
  - Melanargia galathea ssp. galathea (Linnaeus, 1758) (Europe)
  - Melanargia galathea ssp. satnia Fruhstorfer, 1917 (Caucasus)
  - Melanargia galathea ssp. magdalenae Reichl, 1975
  - Melanargia galathea ssp. syracusana Zeller, 1847
- Melanargia lucasi (Rambur, 1858) (northern Africa)
  - Melanargia lucasi ssp. lucasi (Rambur, 1858)
  - Melanargia lucasi ssp. meadwaldoi Rothschild, 1917
- Melanargia lachesis (Hübner, 1790) - Iberian marbled white
- Melanargia evartianae (Wagener, 1976) (northern Iran)
  - Melanargia evartianae ssp. evartianae Wagener, 1976
  - Melanargia evartianae ssp. sadjadii Carbonell & Naderi, 2006
- Melanargia teneates (Ménétriés, 1832) (northern Iran)
  - Melanargia teneates ssp. teneates (Ménétriés, 1832)
  - Melanargia teneates ssp. meda (Grum-Grshimailo, 1895)
- Melanargia hylata (Ménétriés, 1832)
- Melanargia larissa (Geyer, 1828) - Balkan marbled white
  - Melanargia larissa ssp. larissa (Geyer, 1828)
  - Melanargia larissa ssp. hylata (Ménétriés, 1832) (Turkey and Iran)
  - Melanargia larissa ssp. grumi (Standfuss, 1892)
  - Melanargia larissa ssp. lorestanensis (Carbonell & Naderi, 2007)
  - Melanargia larissa ssp. iranica (Seitz, 1907)
  - Melanargia larissa ssp. taurica (Rober, 1896)
  - Melanargia larissa ssp. massageta (Staudinger, 1901)
  - Melanargia larissa ssp. karabagi (Koçak, 1976)
  - Melanargia larissa ssp. kocaki (Wagener, 1983)
  - Melanargia larissa ssp. syriaca (Oberthür, 1894)
  - Melanargia larissa ssp. titea (Klug, 1832) (= titania Calberla, 1891, = standfussi Wagener, 1983)
- Melanargia wiskotii (Rober, 1896)
- Melanargia russiae (Esper, 1783) - Esper's marbled white (southern Europe to central Asia)
  - Melanargia russiae ssp. russiae (Esper, 1793)
  - Melanargia russiae ssp. cleanthe (Boisduval, 1833)
  - Melanargia russiae ssp. japygia (Cyrillo, 1787)
- Melanargia transcaspica (Staudinger, 1901)
  - Melanargia transcaspica ssp. transcaspica (Staudinger, 1901)
  - Melanargia transcaspica ssp. eberti (Wagener, 1975)
- Melanargia parce (Staudinger, 1882)
- Melanargia lucida (Staudinger, 1886)

Subgenus Argeformia (Verity, 1953)

- Melanargia occitanica (Esper, 1793) - western marbled white (south-west of Europe, northern Africa and Sicily)
  - Melanargia occitanica ssp. occitanica (Esper, 1793)
  - Melanargia occitanica ssp. pelagia (Oberthur, 1911)
  - Melanargia occitanica ssp. pherusa (Boisduval, 1832)
- Melanargia ines (Hoffmannsegg, 1804) - Spanish marbled white (Portugal, Spain, Morocco, Algeria, Tunisia and Libya)
  - Melanargia ines ssp. ines (Hoffmannsegg, 1804)
  - Melanargia ines ssp. fathme (Wagner, 1913)
  - Melanargia ines ssp. jahandiezi (Oberthür, 1922)
- Melanargia arge (Sulzer, 1776) - Italian marbled white (Italy)

Subgenus Halimede (Oberthür & Houlbert, 1922)

- Melanargia leda (Leech, 1891) (Tibet and western China)
  - Melanargia leda ssp. leda (Leech, 1891) (=yunnana Oberthür, 1891)
  - Melanargia leda ssp. melli Wagener, 1961
- Melanargia halimede (Ménétriés, 1858) (eastern Mongolia, north-east of China and Korea)
  - Melanargia halimede ssp. halimede (Ménétriés, 1858) (=gratiani Wagener, 1961)
  - Melanargia halimede ssp. coreana (Okamoto, 1926)
- Melanargia meridionalis (Felder, 1862) (central and western China)
  - Melanargia meridionalis ssp. meridionalis (C. & R. Felder, 1862)
  - Melanargia meridionalis ssp. tapaishanensis (Wagener, 1961)
- Melanargia lugens (Honrath, 1888) (central China)
  - Melanargia lugens ssp. lugens (Honrath, 1888) (= ahyoui Wagener, 1961)
  - Melanargia lugens ssp. hengshanensis (Wagener, 1961) (= hoenei Wagener, 1961)
  - Melanargia lugens ssp. montana (Leech, 1890)
- Melanargia epimede (Staudinger, 1892) (eastern Mongolia, north-east of China and Korea)
  - Melanargia epimede ssp. epimede (Staudinger, 1887)
  - Melanargia epimede ssp. pseudolugens (Staudinger, 1887)
  - Melanargia epimede ssp. ganymedes (Heyne, 1895) (Tibet)
- Melanargia asiatica (Oberthür & Houlbert, 1922) (= dejeani Wagener, 1961, = elisa Wagener, 1961, = sigberti Bozano, 2004) (China)

== Gallery ==
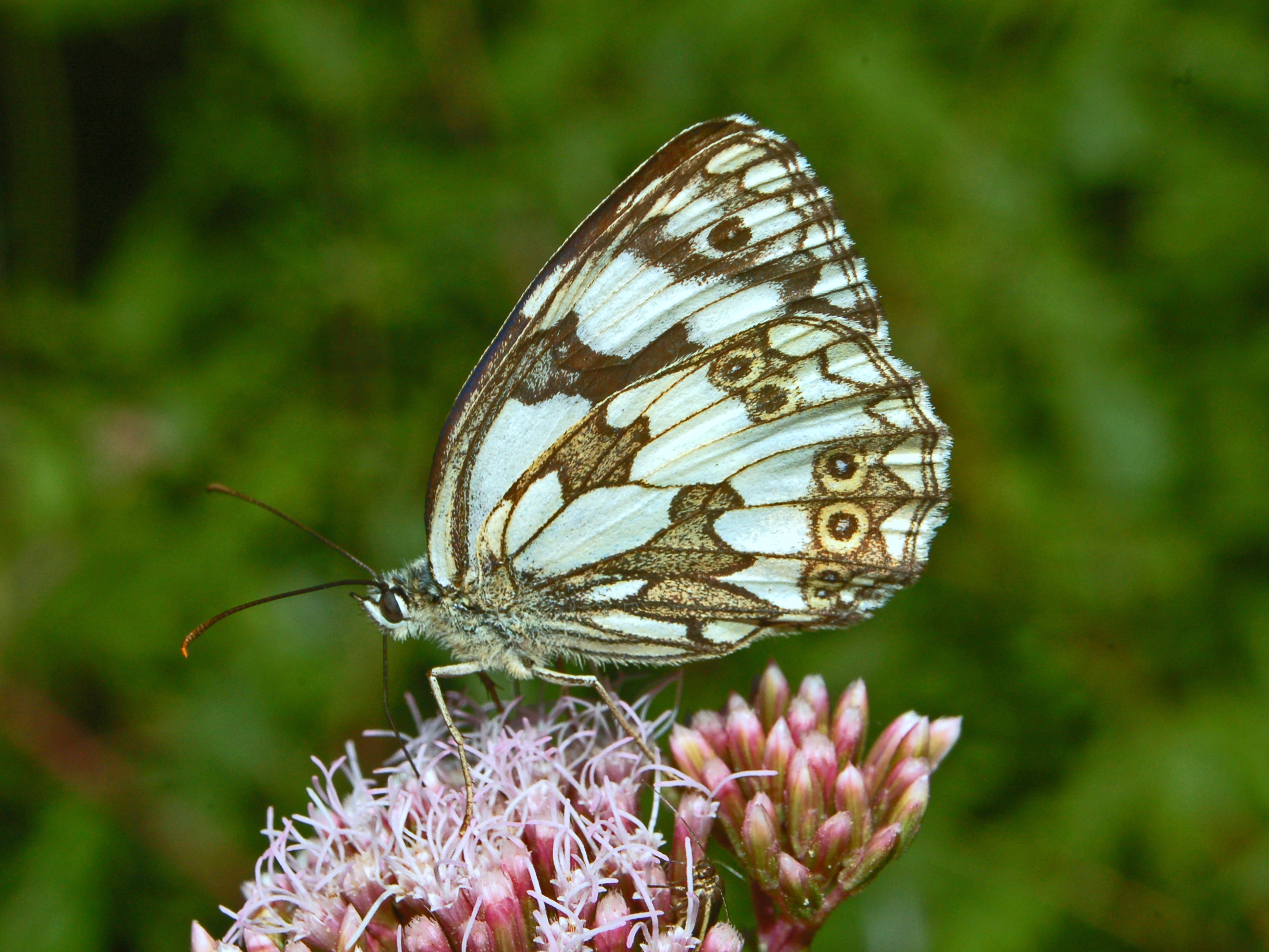
Melanargia galathea, lateral view

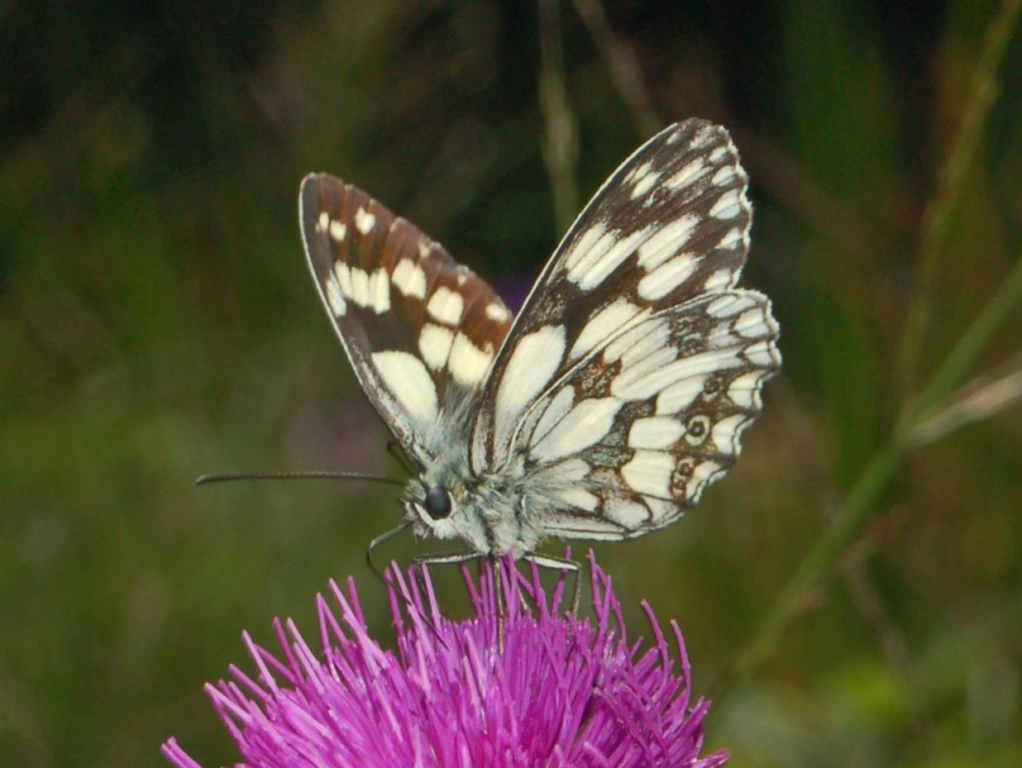
Melanargia galathea

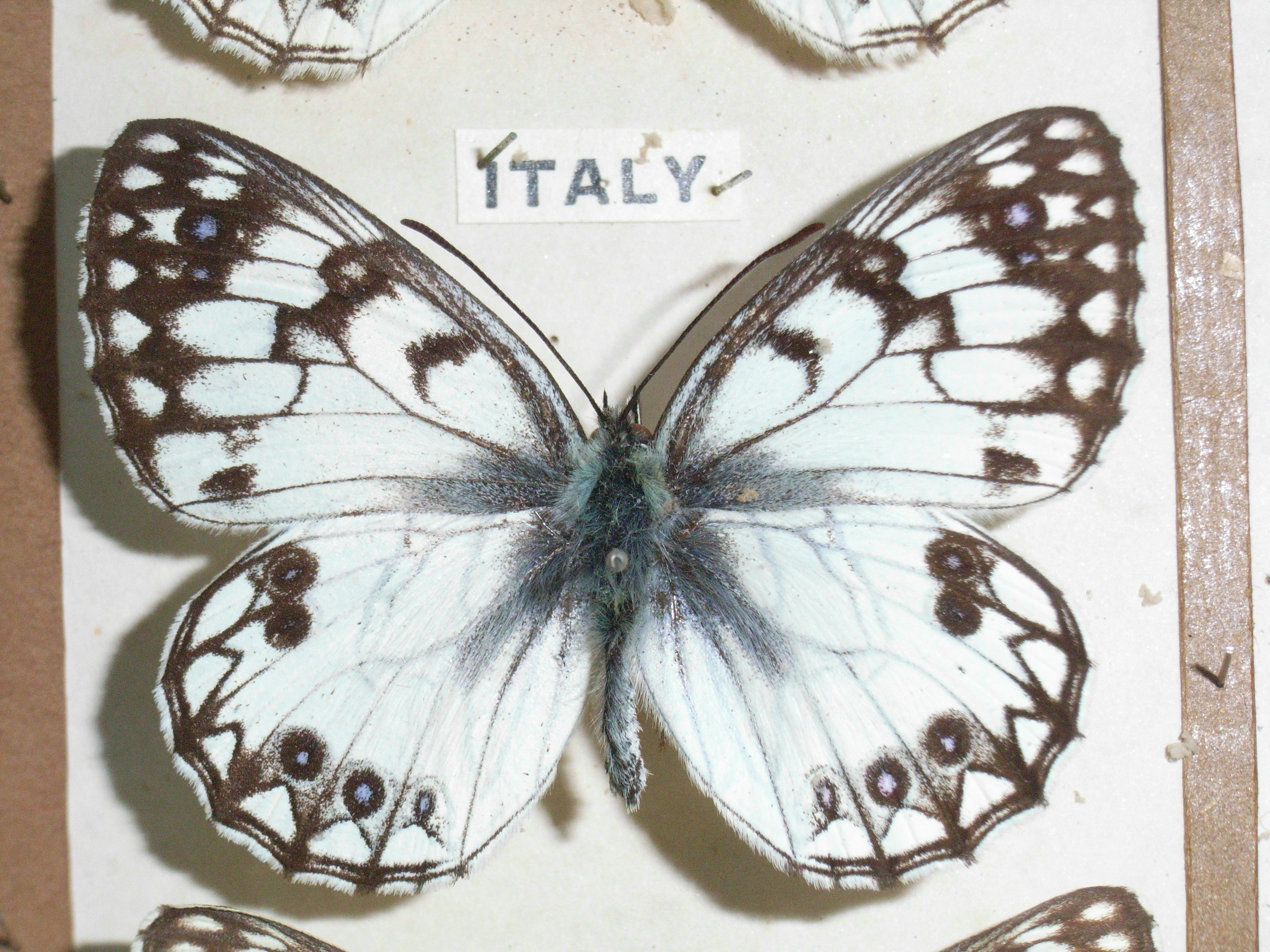
Melanargia arge

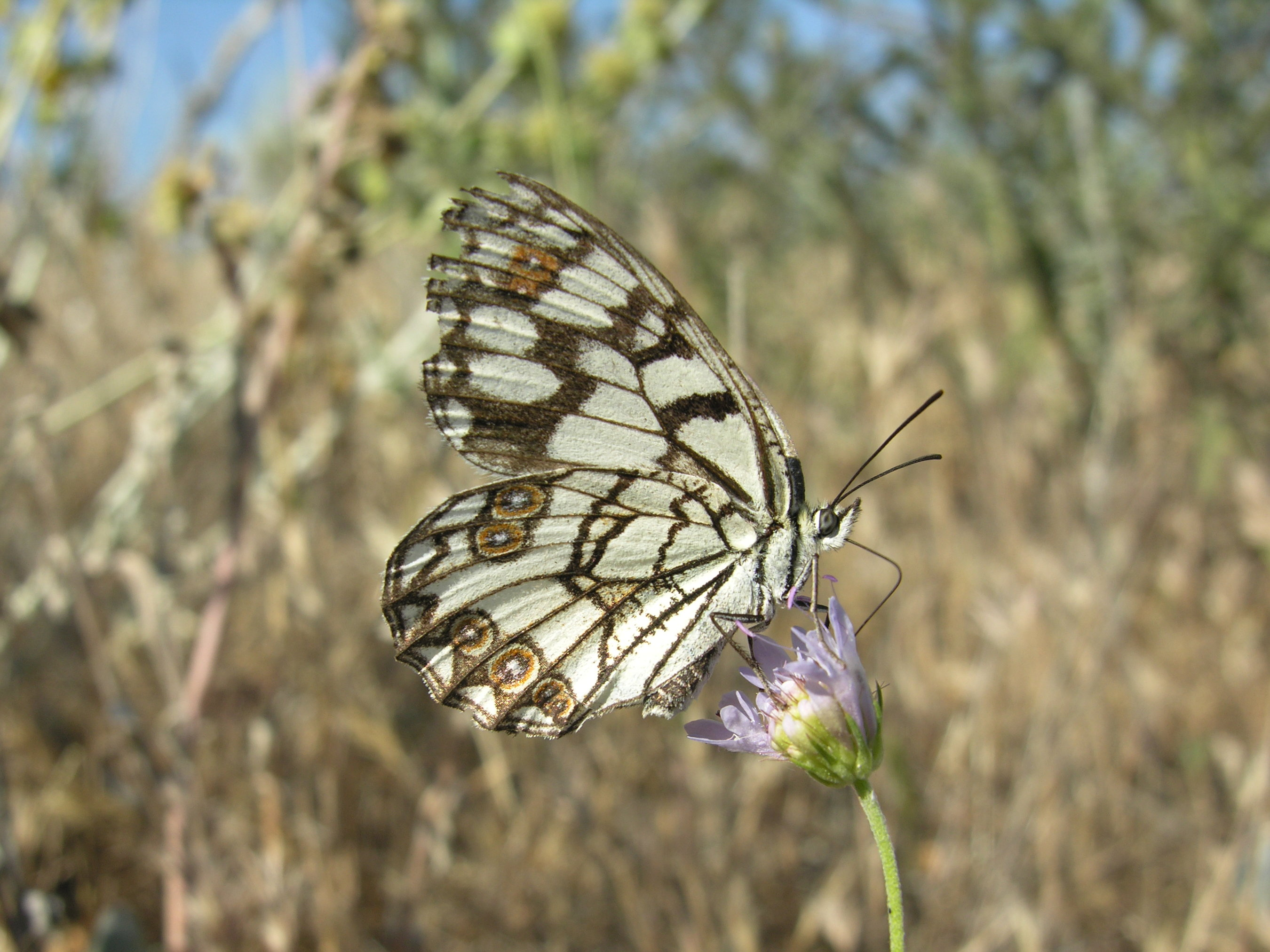
Melanargia ines

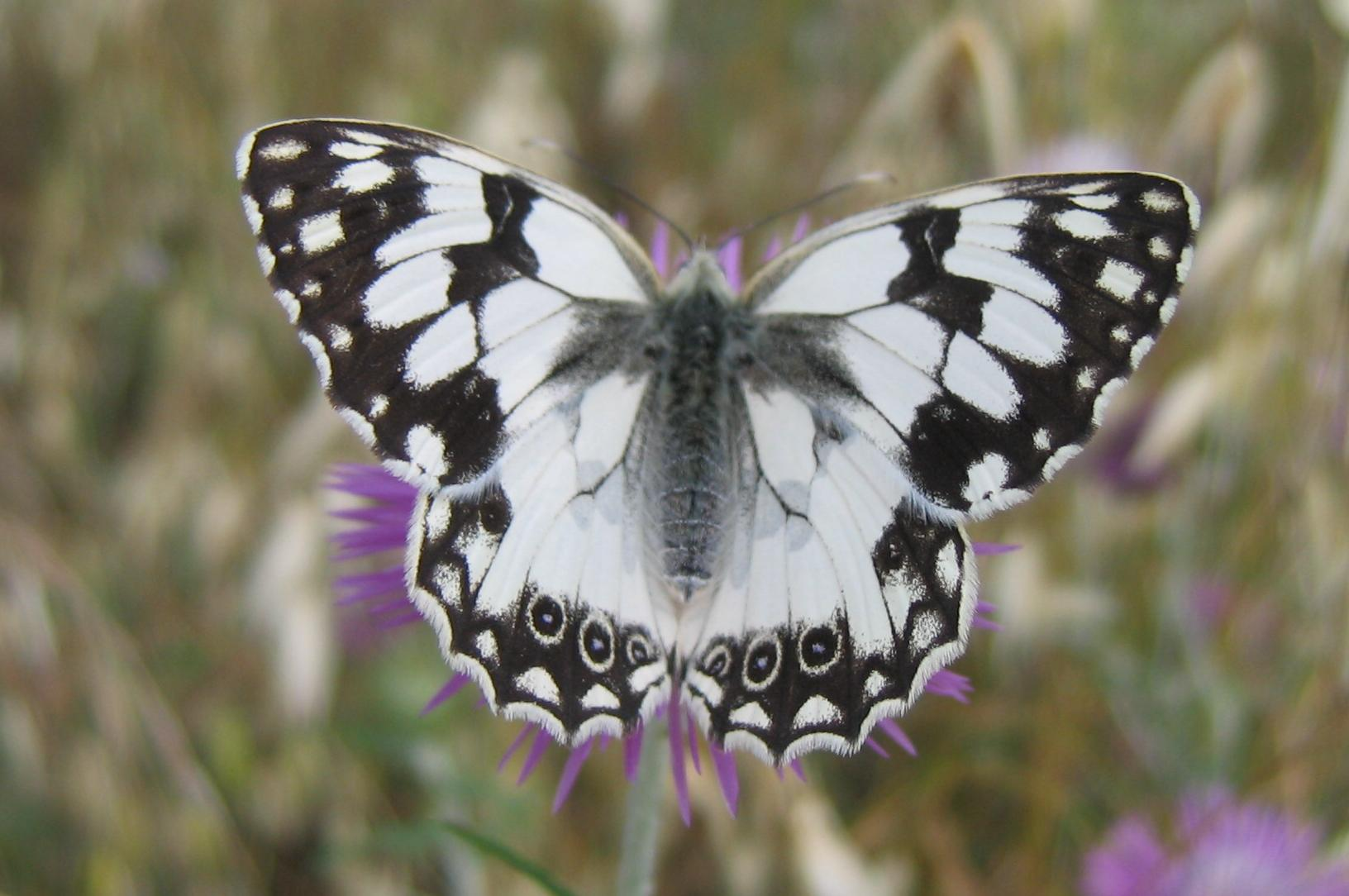
Melanargia lachesis

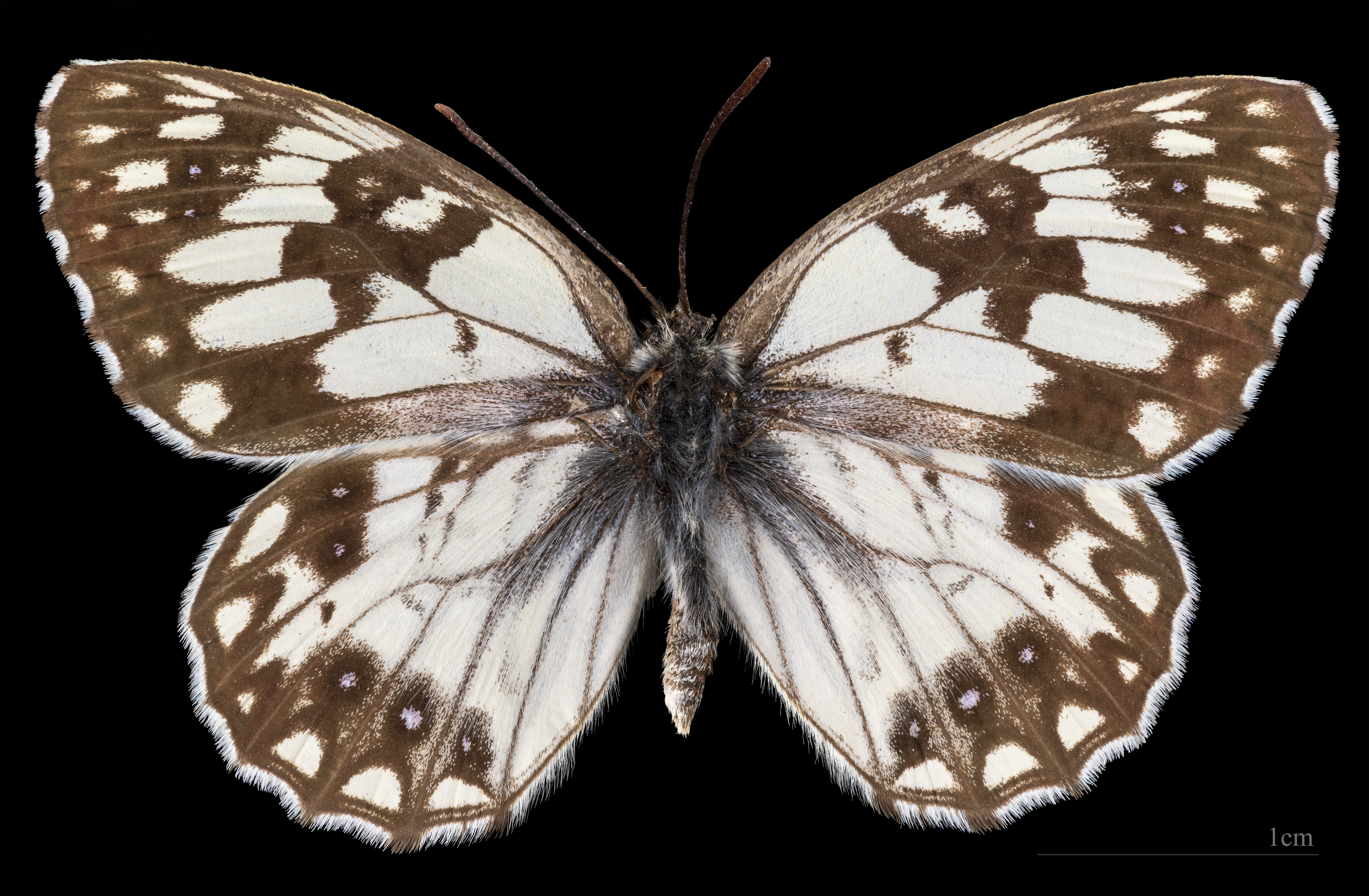
Melanargia occitanica

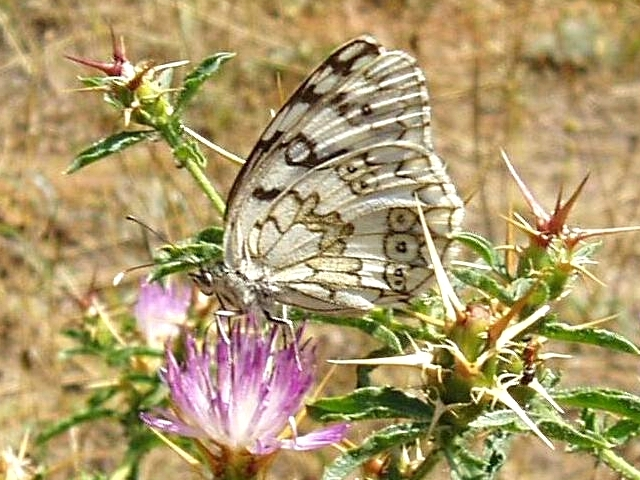
Melanargia russiae

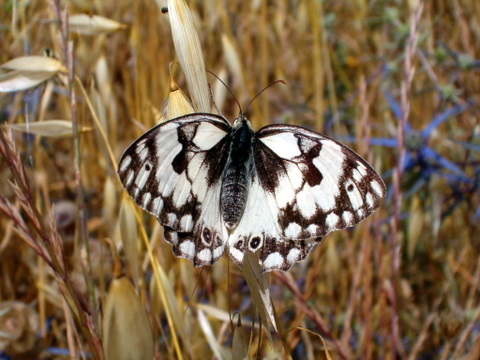
Melanargia titea (Melanargia larissa ssp. titea)
