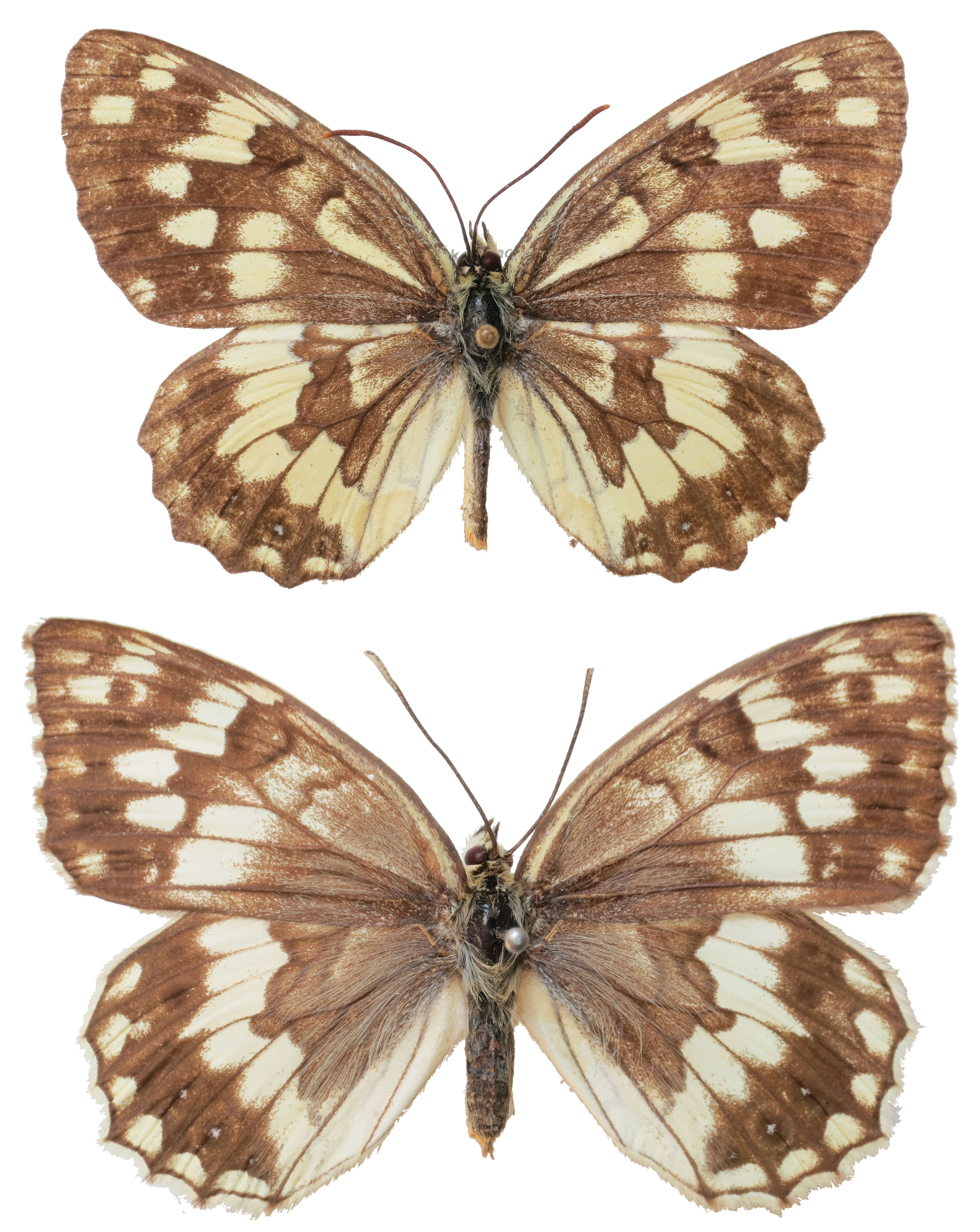
- A pair of Melanargia hylata, a male and female

Scientific classification
- Kingdom: Animalia
- Phylum: Arthropoda
- Clade: Pancrustacea
- Class: Insecta
- Order: Lepidoptera
- Family: Nymphalidae
- Genus: Melanargia
- Species: M. hylata

Binomial name
- Melanargia hylata Ménétries, 1832

Synonyms
- Hipparchia hylata; Melanargia iranica

= Melanargia hylata =

Species of butterfly

Melanargia hylata, or Ménétries's marbled white, is a species of lepidopteran in the family Nymphalidae. It is found in Anatolia and Iran.

The butterfly's reproductive season is in July.
