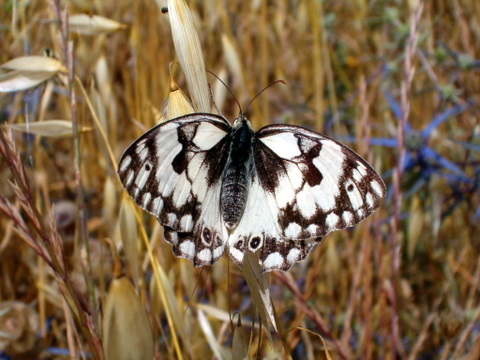

Conservation status
- Least Concern (IUCN 3.1)

Scientific classification
- Kingdom: Animalia
- Phylum: Arthropoda
- Class: Insecta
- Order: Lepidoptera
- Family: Nymphalidae
- Genus: Melanargia
- Species: M. titea

Binomial name
- Melanargia titea (Klug, 1832)

= Melanargia titea =

Levantine marbled white

Species of butterfly

Melanargia titea, the Levantine marbled white, is a butterfly of the family Nymphalidae.

== Distribution ==
It is found in Syria, Jordan, the Palestinian Territories, Israel, Armenia, Lebanon, Iran and Turkey.

== Description ==
The wingspan is about 55 mm (2.2 in). Adults are on wing from April to June.

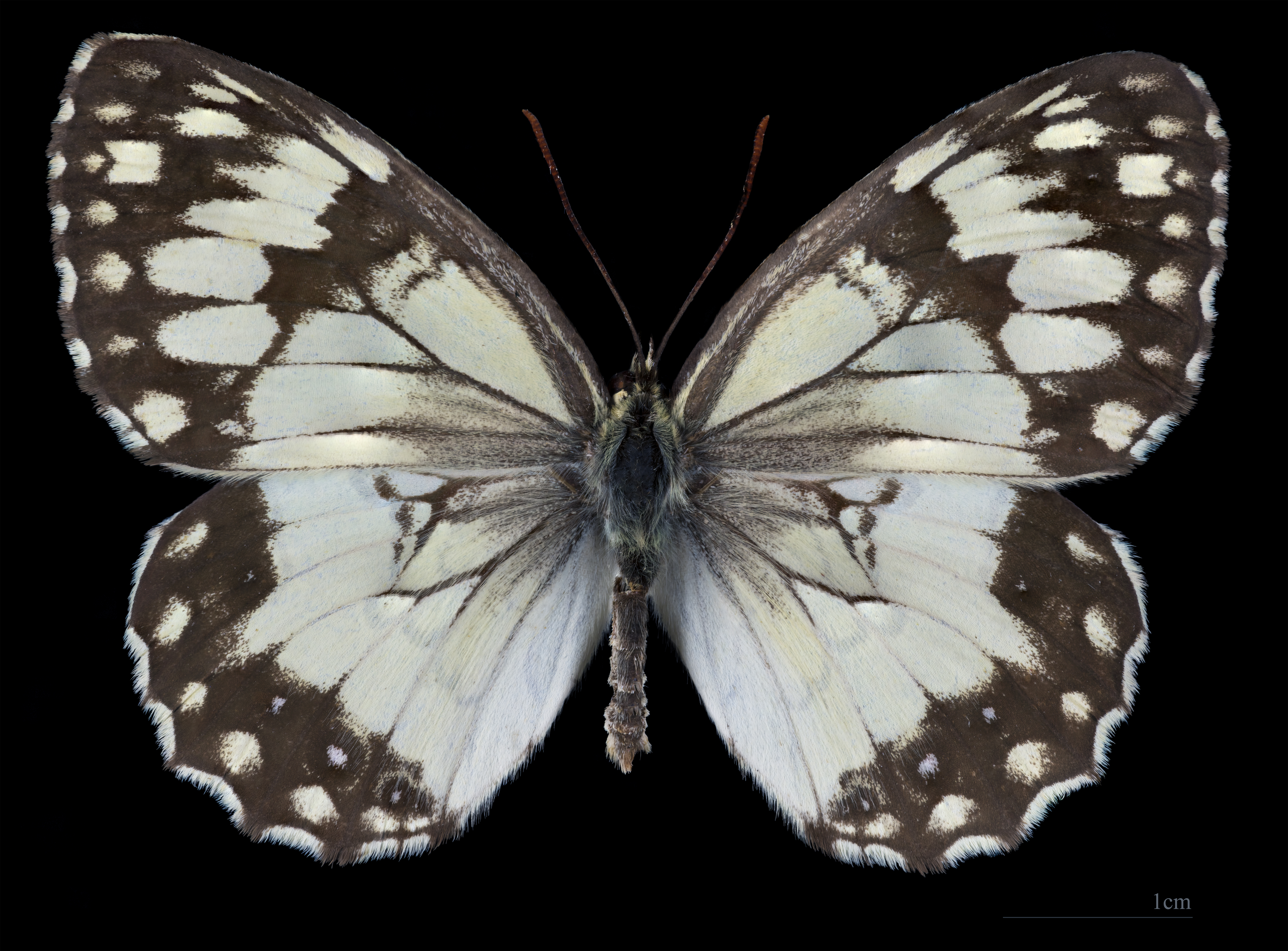
Melanargia titea ♂

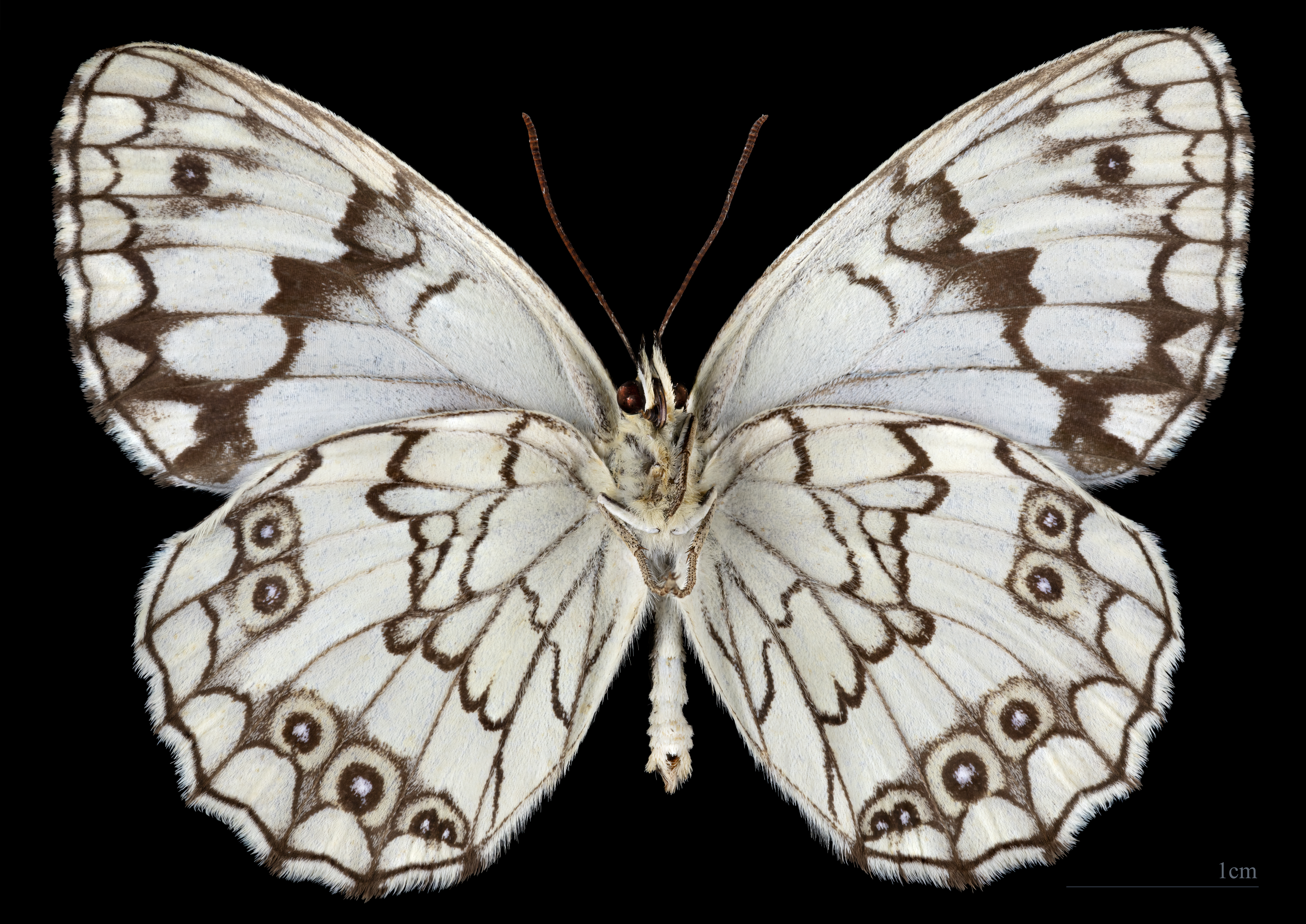
Melanargia titea ♂ △

The larvae feed on Gramineae and Poaceae species.

== Subspecies ==
- Melanargia titea titea
- Melanargia titea wiskotti (Röber, 1896) (Turkey)

== Taxonomy ==
Recent research suggest Melanargia titea is in fact a subspecies of Melanargia larissa, while Melanargia titea wiskotti is raised to full-species rank.
