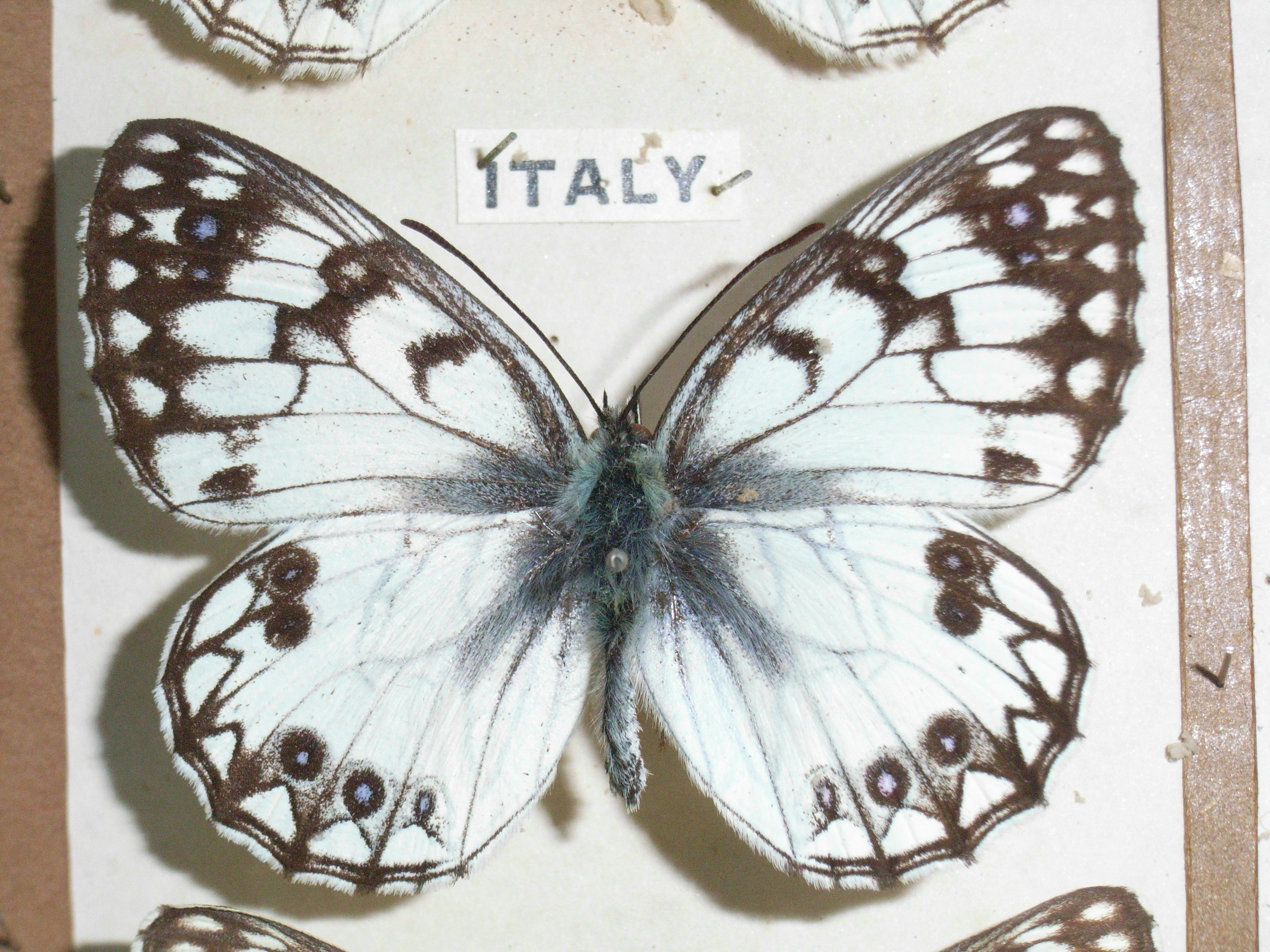

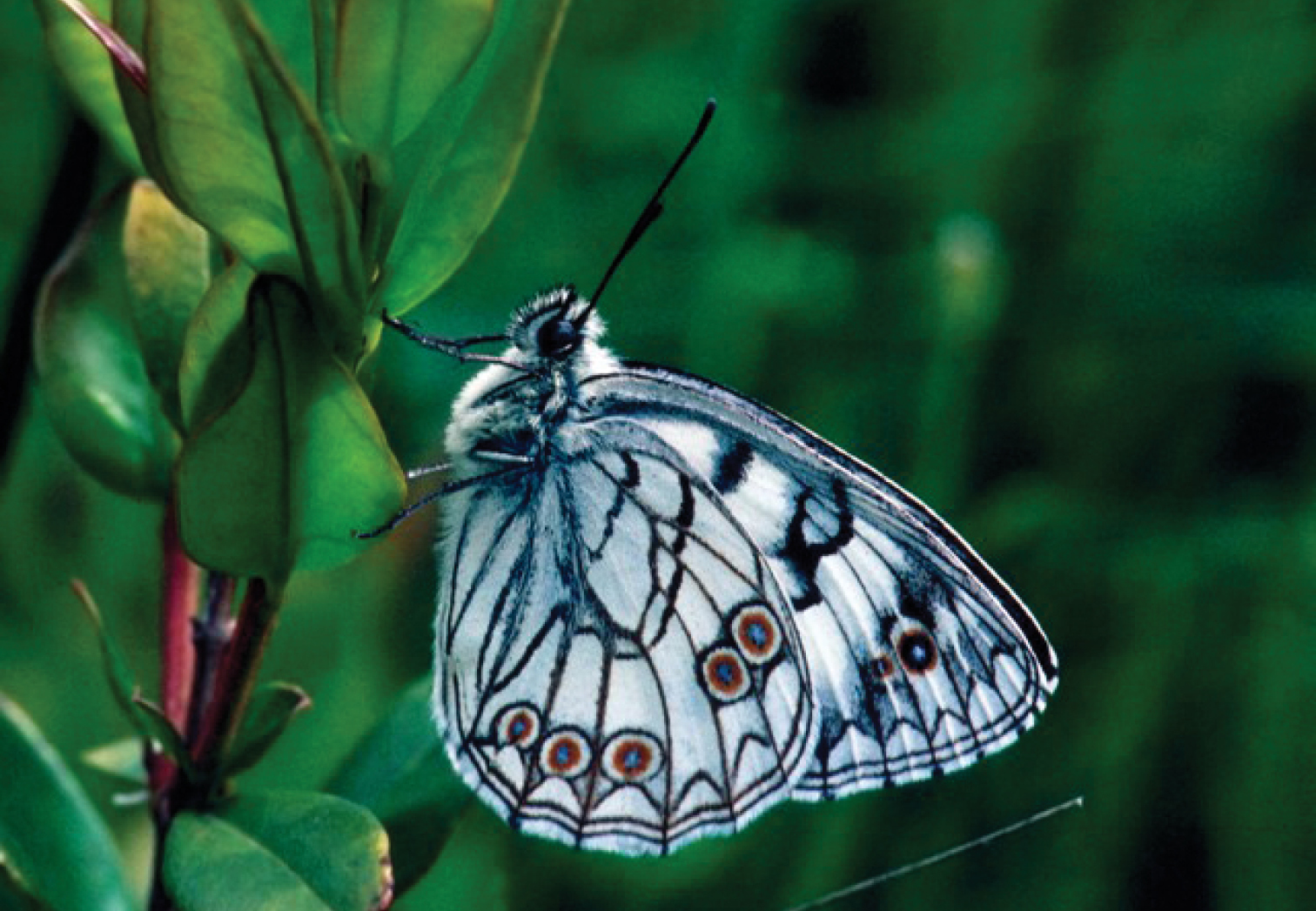

Conservation status
- Least Concern (IUCN 3.1)

Scientific classification
- Kingdom: Animalia
- Phylum: Arthropoda
- Clade: Pancrustacea
- Class: Insecta
- Order: Lepidoptera
- Family: Nymphalidae
- Genus: Melanargia
- Species: M. arge

Binomial name
- Melanargia arge (Sulzer, 1776)

= Melanargia arge =

Italian marbled white

Species of butterfly

Melanargia arge, the Italian marbled white, is a butterfly of the family Nymphalidae. M. arge Sulz. (= amphitrite Hbn.) (39 f). Above white, only the submarginal lunate line, the two short bands in the centre and at the apex of the cell, and the beautifully blue-centred ocelli being dark — ab. caeca Stgr. is without ocelli; rare among the preceding. It is an endemic species found only in the southern half of Italy and the eastern half of the Italian island of Sicily. It flies in May and June in a single generation in rocky places with abundant flowers. The caterpillar feeds on grasses.
