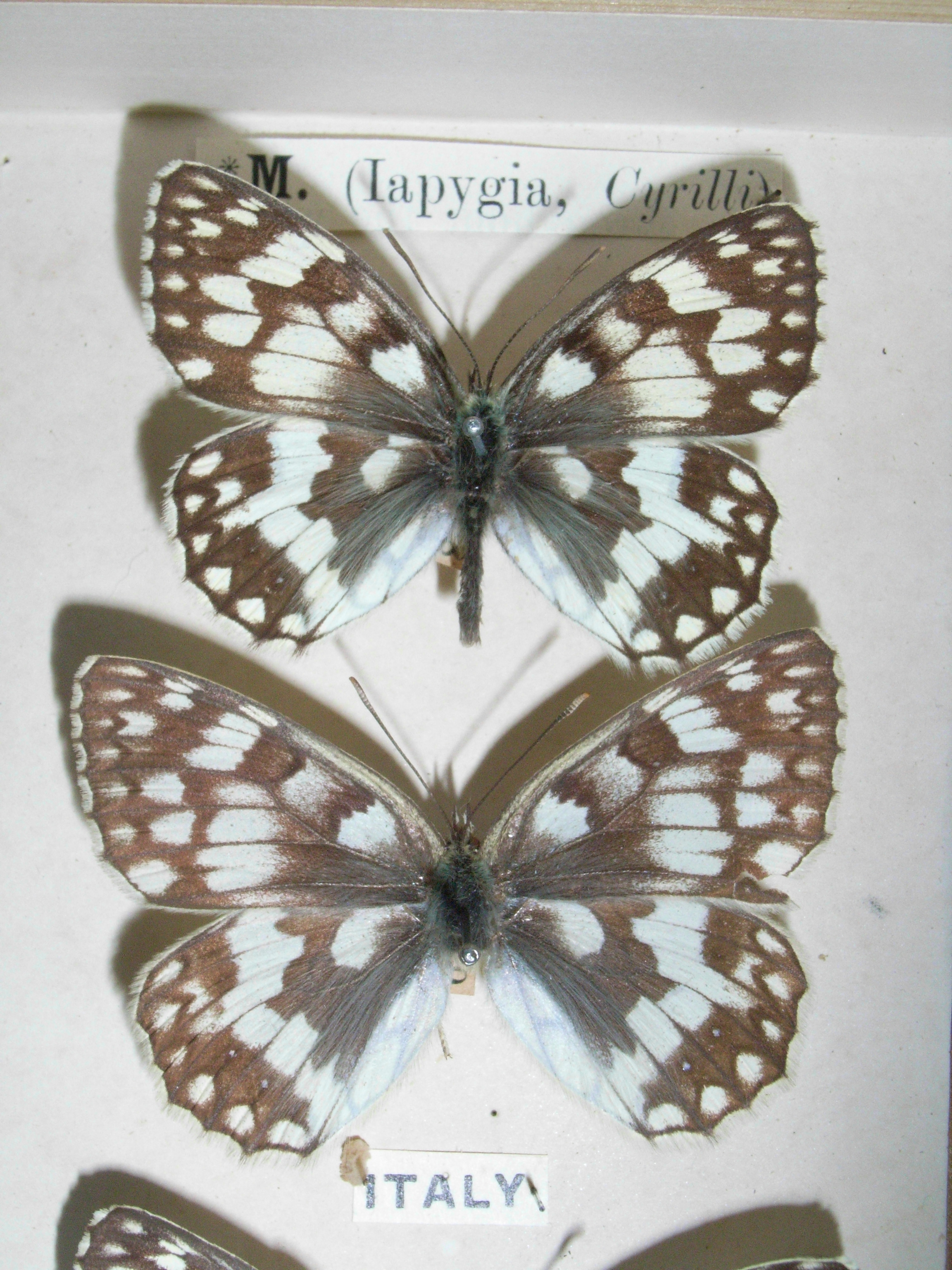

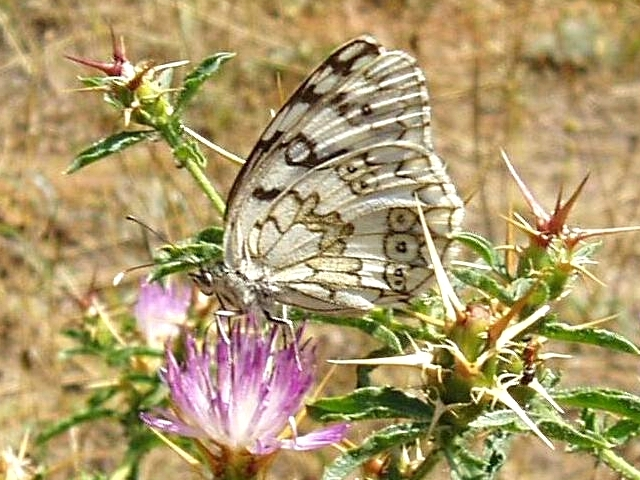

Scientific classification
- Kingdom: Animalia
- Phylum: Arthropoda
- Clade: Pancrustacea
- Class: Insecta
- Order: Lepidoptera
- Family: Nymphalidae
- Genus: Melanargia
- Species: M. russiae

Binomial name
- Melanargia russiae (Esper, 1783)

Synonyms
- Papilio russiae Esper, 1783

= Melanargia russiae =

Species of butterfly

Melanargia russiae, or Esper's marbled white, is a butterfly in the family Nymphalidae. It is found in Spain, Portugal, south-eastern France, Italy, the Balkans, southern Russia, the Caucasus and western Siberia.

The male has a wingspan of 26–30 mm. In suwarovius Hbst. (– clotho Hbn., russiae Esp.) (38 e), which represents the species in the North and extends from Hungary across South Russia and Siberia to the Altai, the discocellular band of the forewing becomes lighter in consequence of the appearance of a white central spot in the same, this white spot with its black border forming a kind of median ocellus. – In caucasica Nordm. (– xenia Frr.) [ subspecies japygia Cyrillo, 1787] (38 e) also the median band of the hindwing is rendered light by the appearance of white spots, the black markings therefore being all separated into stripes, lunules, and arcuate lines. In the Eastern Caucasus (Daghestan) and Armenia. – transcaspica Stgr. subspecies ''trancaspica'' (38 e) has a little more black than this white form, the submarginal macular lines being thickened and proximally shaded with grey scaling, which extends on the veins as dark projections to the margin, the median band of the hindwing above also being filled in with dark scaling.

Adults are on wing from June to August, although mainly in July in roccky places mainly in steppe and meadow-steppe communities. There is one generation per year.

The larvae feed on Brachypodium, Poa, Stipa pennata and Aegilops geniculata. It overwinters in the larval stage

== Subspecies ==
- Melanargia russiae russiae
- Melanargia russiae transcaspica Staudinger, 1901 (Kopet-Dagh) may be species
- Melanargia russiae japygia (Cyrillo, 1787) (south Italy, Spain)
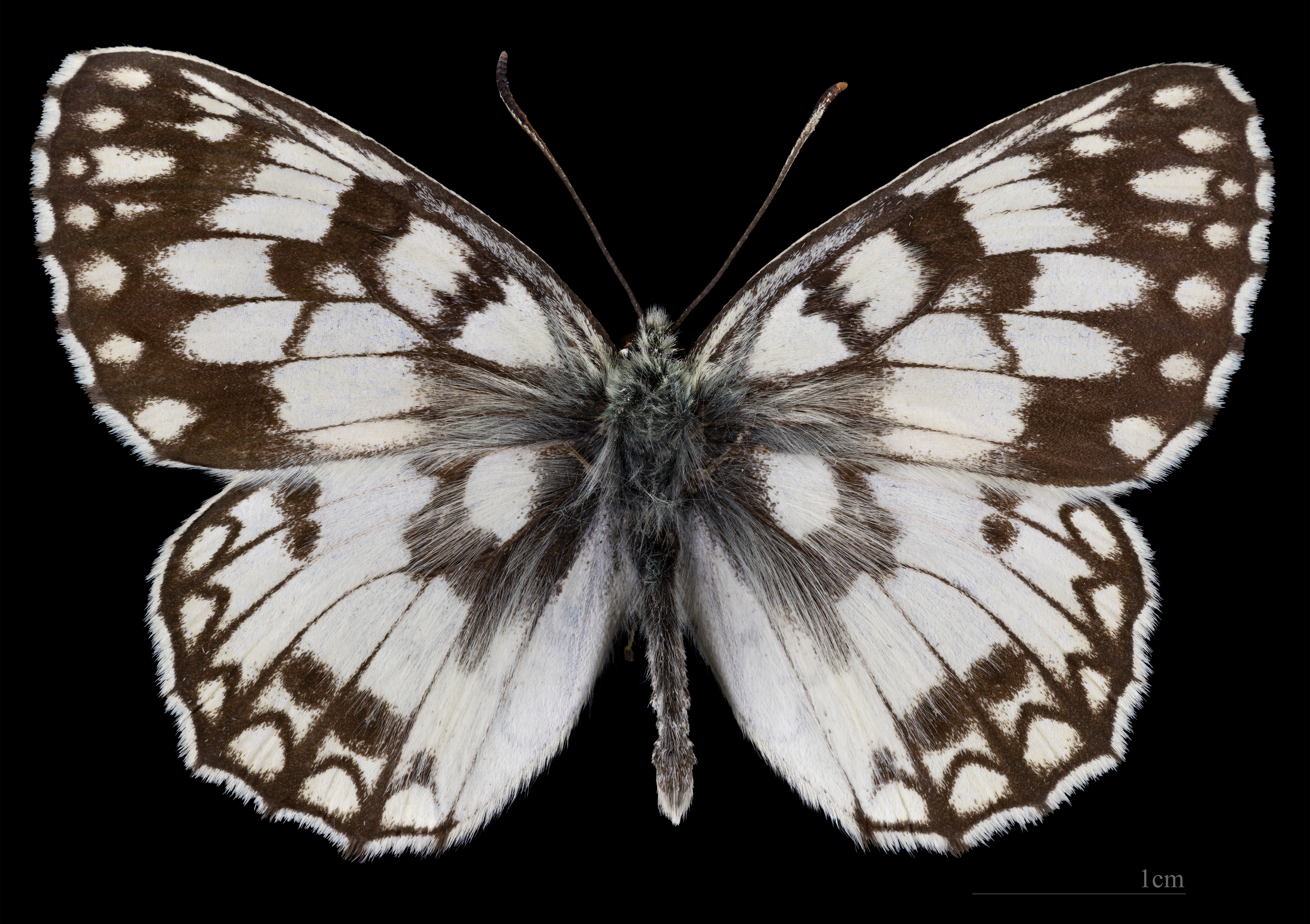
Melanargia russiae japygia ♂

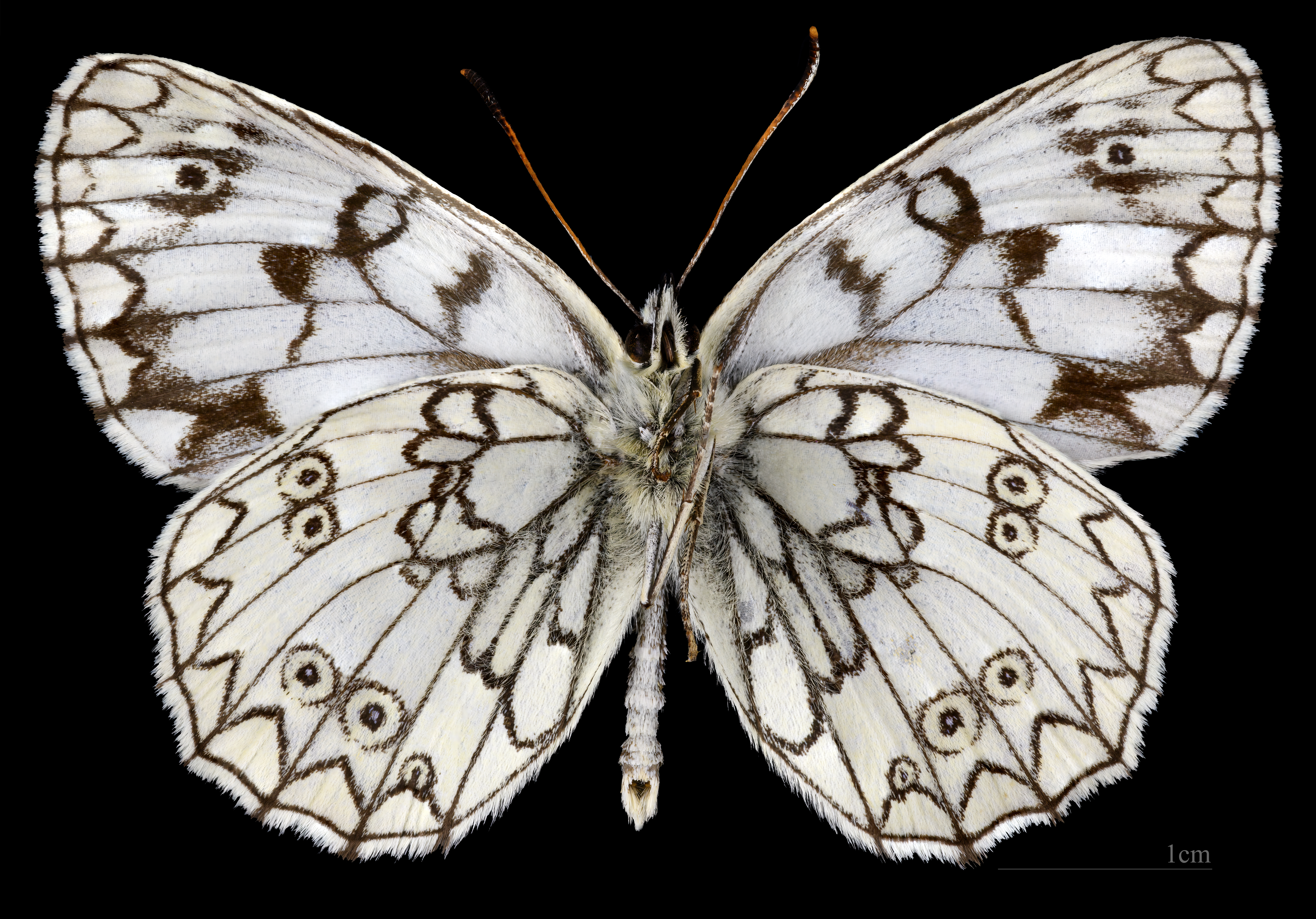
Melanargia russiae japygia ♂ △

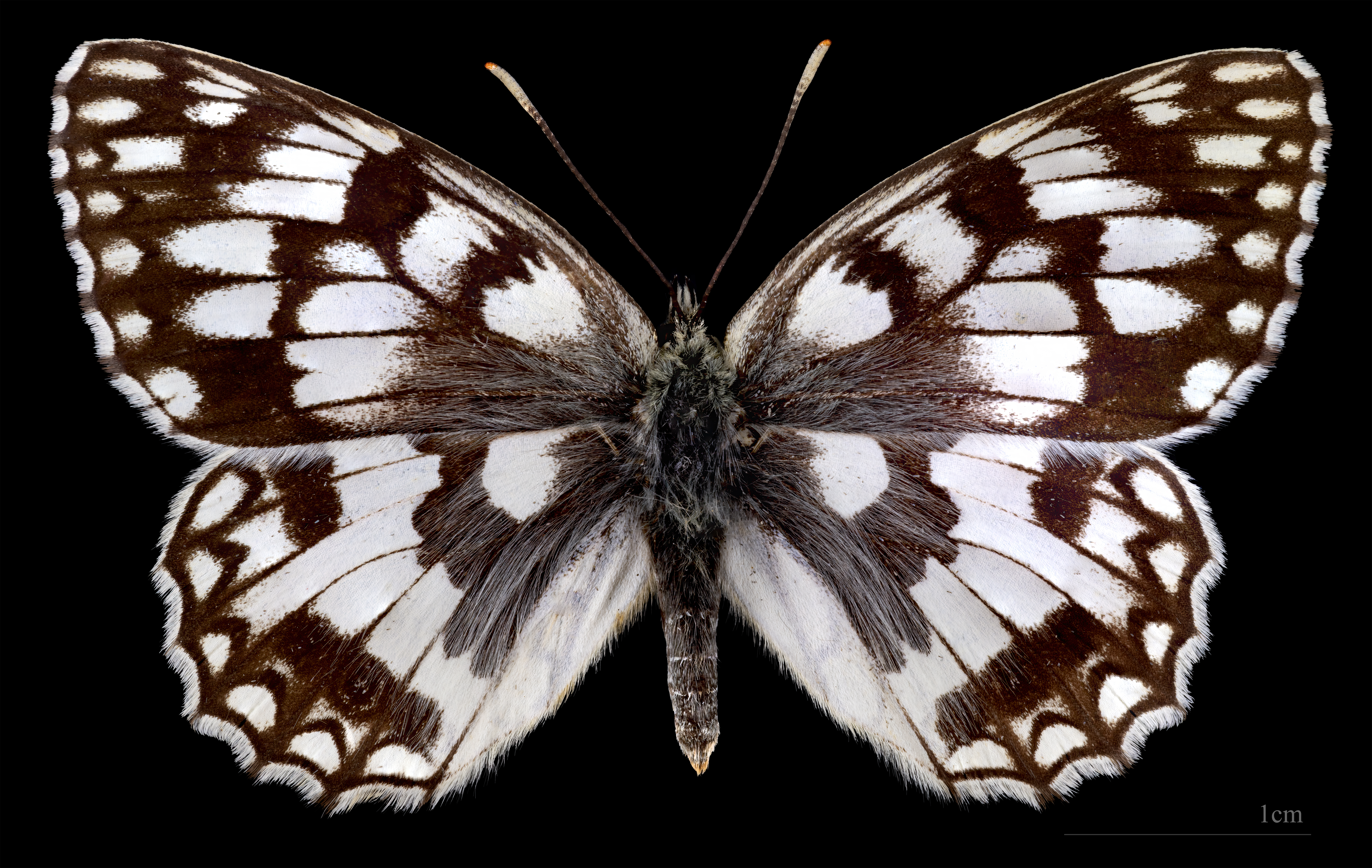
Melanargia russiae japygia ♀

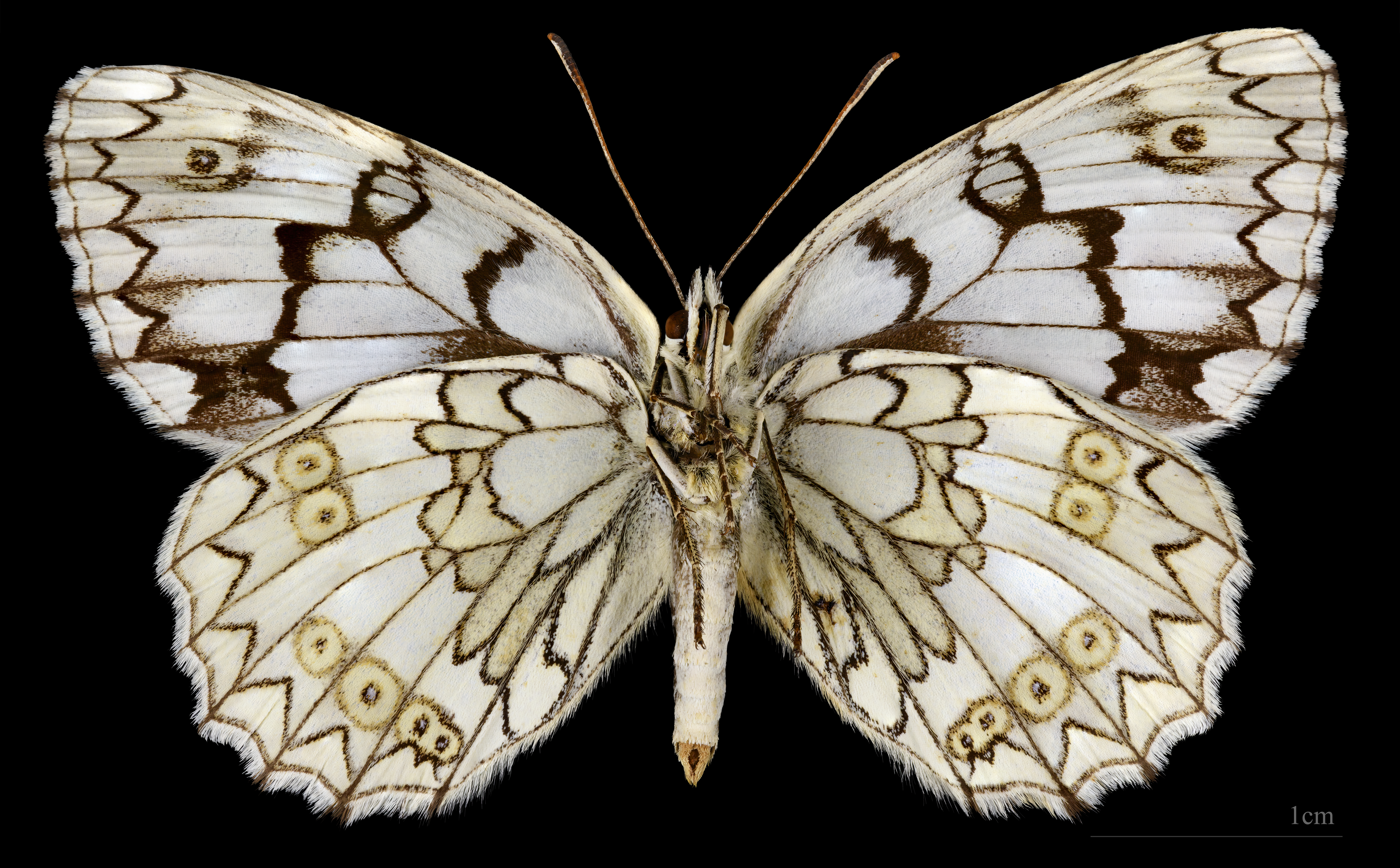
Melanargia russiae japygia ♀ △
