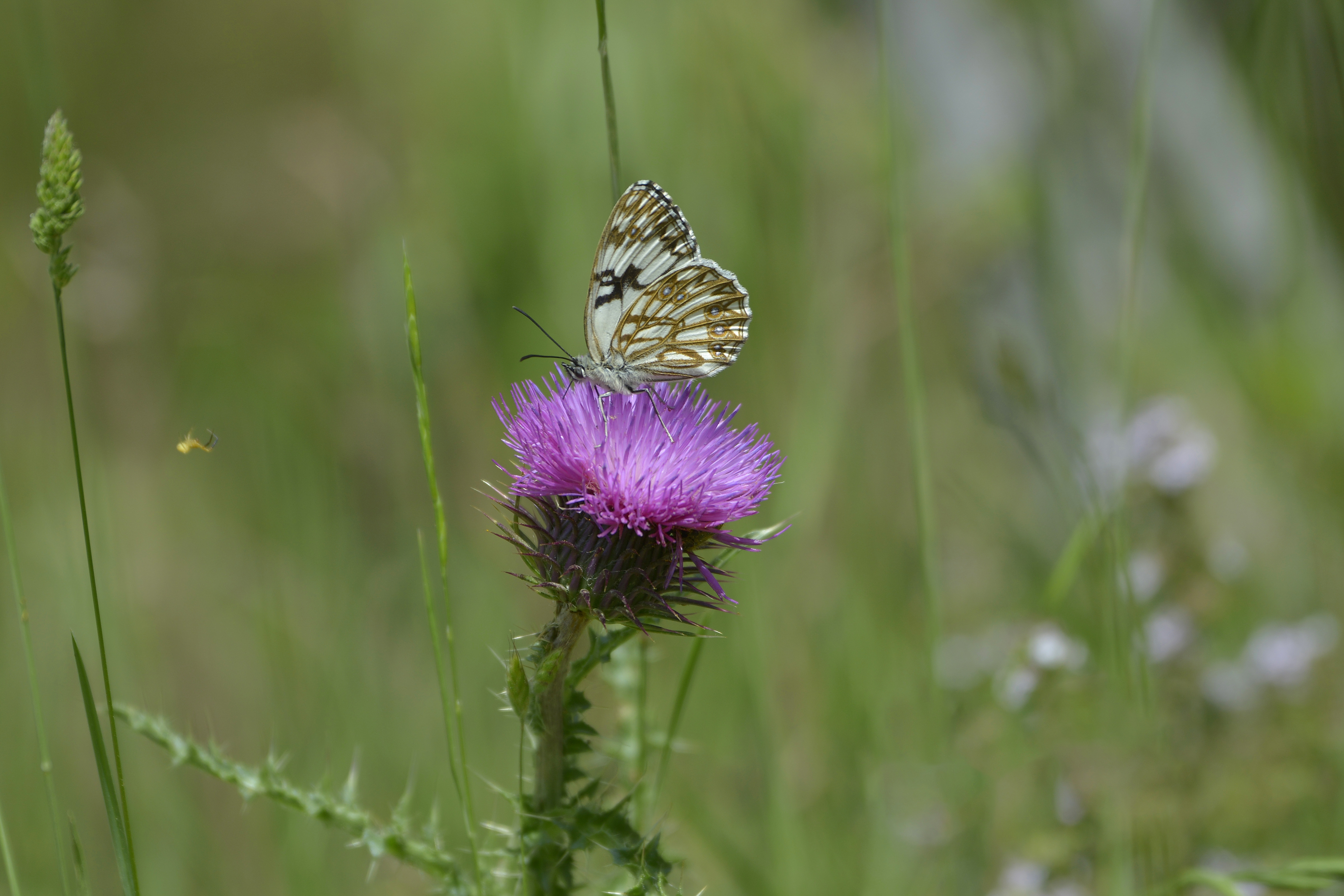

Scientific classification
- Kingdom: Animalia
- Phylum: Arthropoda
- Clade: Pancrustacea
- Class: Insecta
- Order: Lepidoptera
- Family: Nymphalidae
- Genus: Melanargia
- Species: M. occitanica

Binomial name
- Melanargia occitanica Esper, 1793

= Melanargia occitanica =

Species of butterfly

Melanargia occitanica, the western marbled white, is a butterfly species belonging to the family Nymphalidae.

== Distribution ==
It can be found in North Africa and south western Europe.(West Morocco, South-west Europe, Portugal, Spain, South France and Italian Alps).

== Description ==
The length of the forewings is 25–28 mm. Seitz - M. syllius Hbst. (= occitanica Esp.) (39 d, e). At once recognized by the veins and transverse lines forming a network of brown markings on the hindwing beneath, the large ocelli with their heavy whitish violet centres standing in between the stripes. The cell of the forewing above bears a black transverse line not far from its apex.

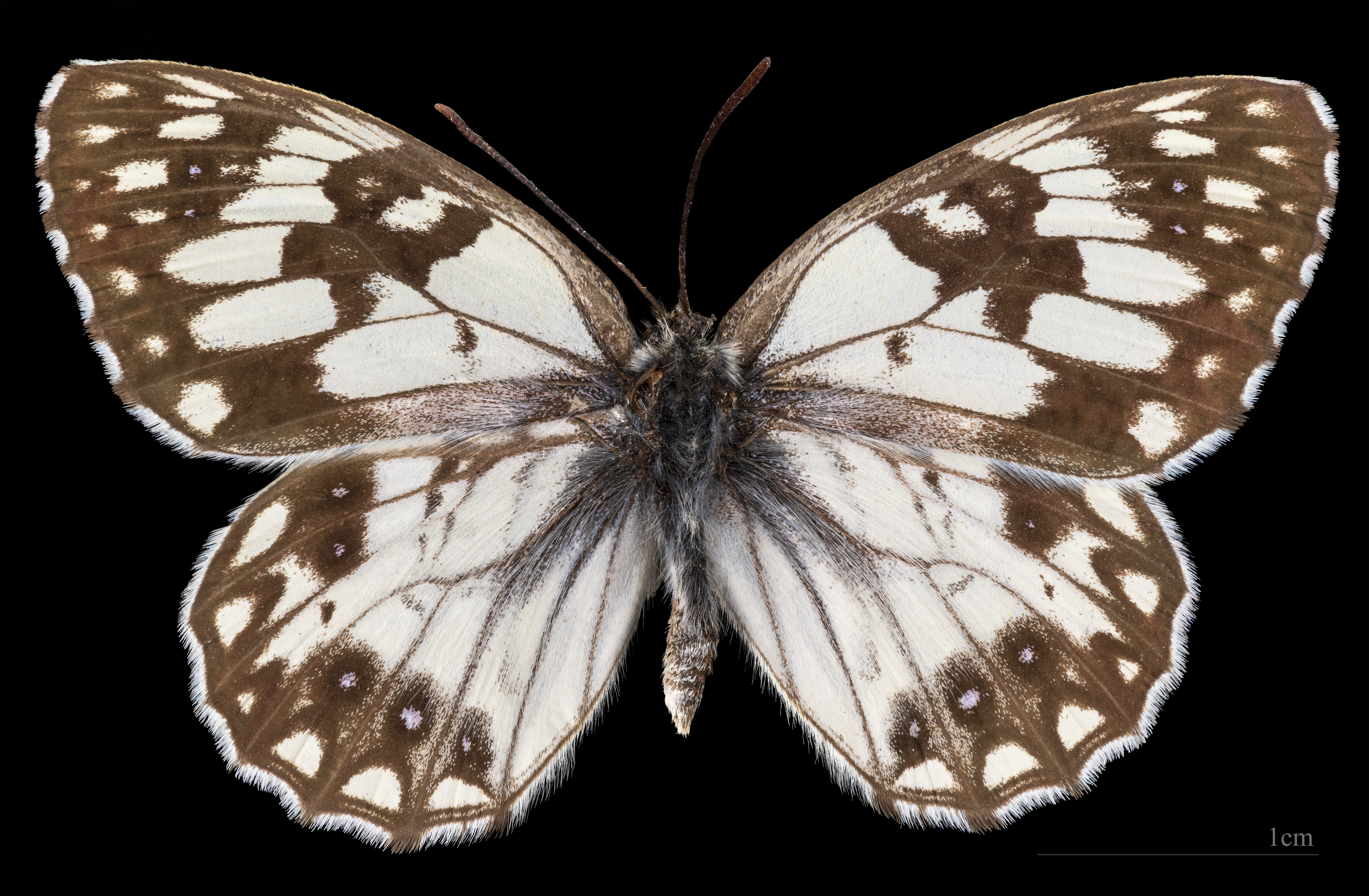
Melanargia occitanica ♂

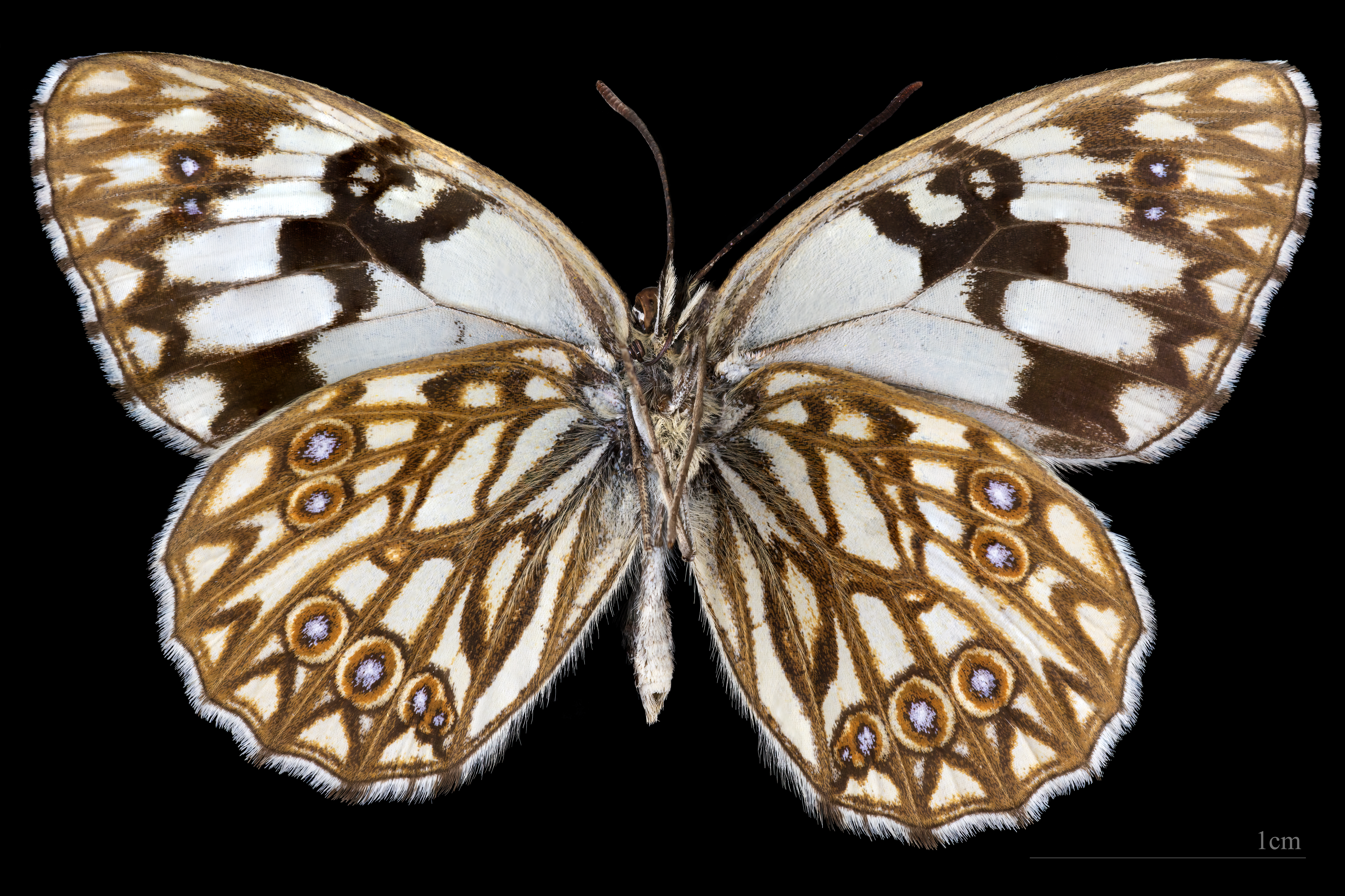
Melanargia occitanica ♂ △

== Subspecies ==
- Melanargia occitanica pelagia Oberthür, 1911 Morocco
- Melanargia occitanica megalatlasica Tarrier, 1995 Tizi-n-Talrhemt High Atlas, Morocco
- Melanargia occitanica moghrebiana Varin, 1951 Ifrane, Azrou, Annoceur, Tizi-n-Foucht, Col du Taghzeft, Aghbalou-Larbi in the Middle Atlas

== Biology ==
In Europe the butterflies fly in one generation from April to June.In Morocco only in May.In Europe the habitat is garrigue; in Morocco the edges of mountain forests.

The larvae feed on various grasses- Brachypodium pinnatum, Dactylis glomerata, Lygeum spartum.
