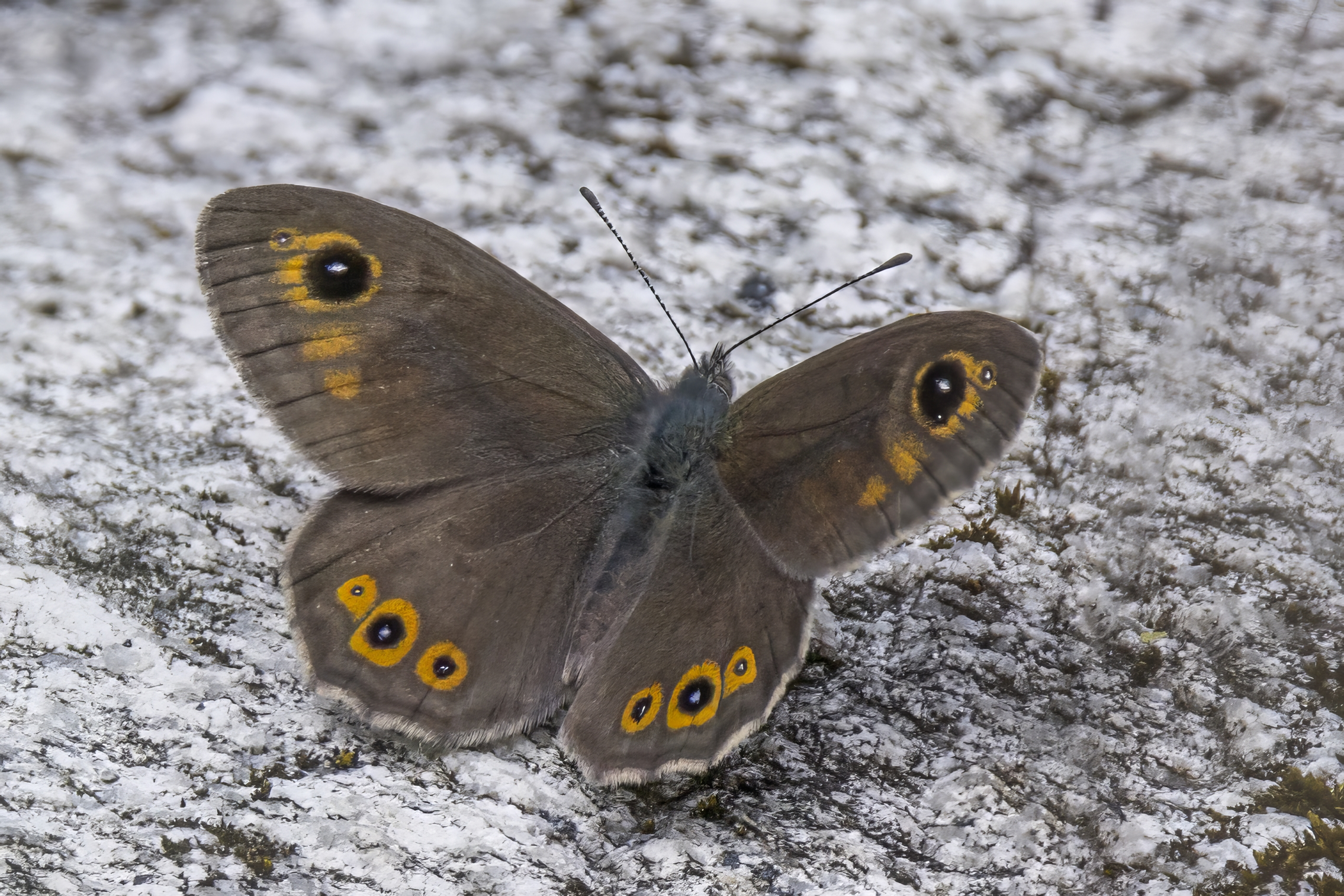
- male
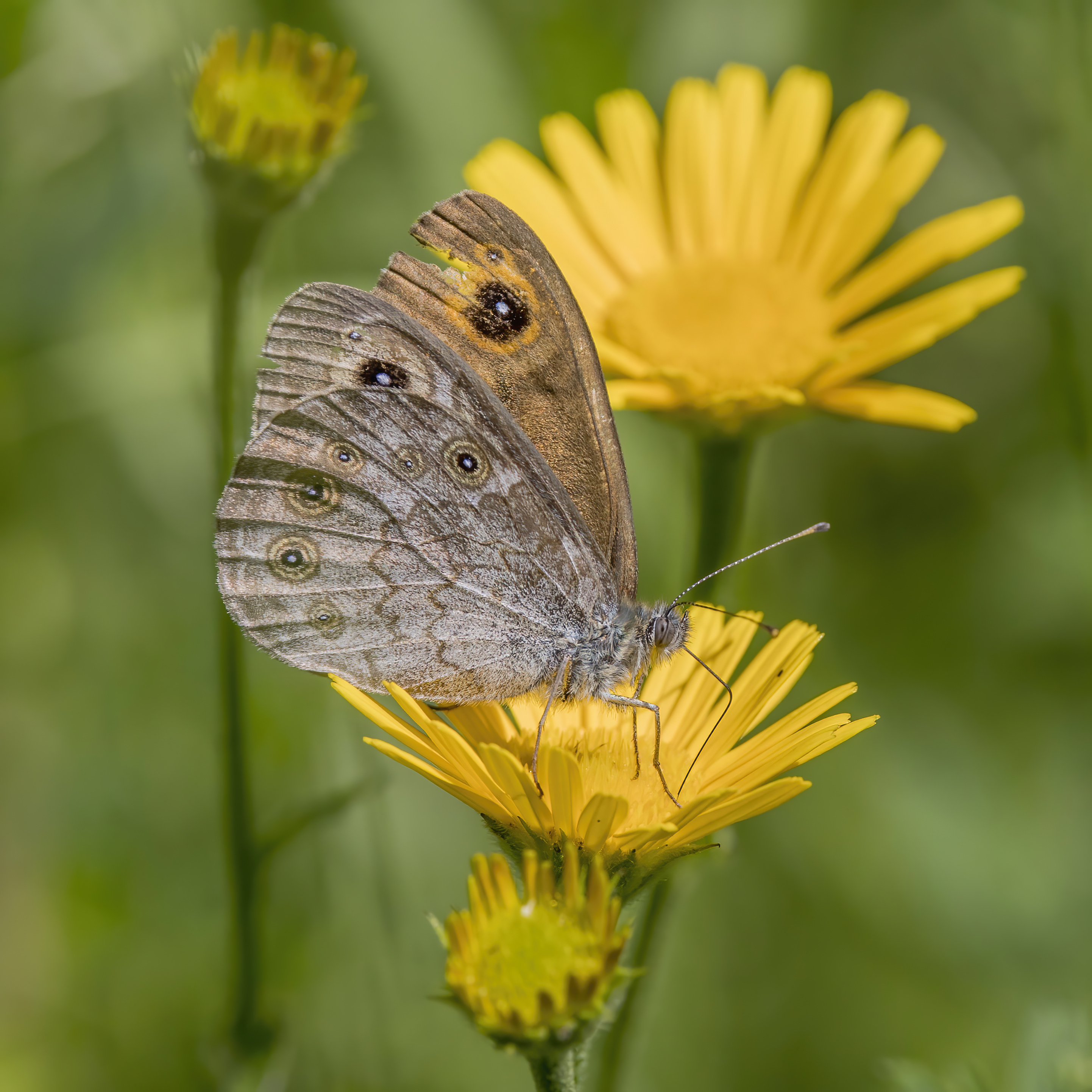

Conservation status
- Least Concern (IUCN 3.1)

Scientific classification
- Kingdom: Animalia
- Phylum: Arthropoda
- Class: Insecta
- Order: Lepidoptera
- Family: Nymphalidae
- Genus: Lasiommata
- Species: L. maera

Binomial name
- Lasiommata maera (Linnaeus, 1758)

= Lasiommata maera =

Species of butterfly

Lasiommata maera, the large wall brown, is a butterfly in the family Nymphalidae.

== Subspecies ==
- Lasiommata maera maera
- Lasiommata maera abastumana (Sheljuzhko, 1937) (Caucasus)
- Lasiommata maera adrasta (Hübner, [1823-1824]) (from south western Europe to Morocco and Algeria)
- Lasiommata maera crimaea (A. Bang-Haas, 1907)
- Lasiommata maera jachontovi (Sheljuzhko, 1937) (Caucasus)
- Lasiommata maera meadewaldoi (Rothschild, 1917) (Morocco)
- Lasiommata maera ordona (Fruhstorfer, 1909) (Siberia)
- Lasiommata maera orientalis (Rühl, 1894) (Armenia)

== Distribution and habitat ==
The species is common in continental Europe. It is also present in the Urals, south western Siberia, Asia Minor, Syria, Iran, Central Asia and the Himalayas. It is absent from the United Kingdom. Its preferred habitats are edges of the forest, unmanaged clearings on forested areas, rocky dry areas and stony slopes, at an elevation of 0–2,000 metres (0–6,562 ft) above sea level.

== Description ==
Lasiommata maera has a wingspan of 44–56 millimetres (1.7–2.2 in). These large butterflies are quite variable in color and pattern. Usually the upperside is orange in the forewings and mostly brown in the hindwings. The forewings always show a single ocellus, while the hindwings bear two or three ocelli. The underside of the forewings is orange and the underside of the hindwings is marbled with gray brown. This species is quite similar to Lasiommata megera, that is smaller and has paler yellow-orange forewings. Seitz P. maera L. (= adrasta Dup.) (45 d). On an average larger than hiera, more evenly coloured, the black markings of the ground less prominent in the nymotypical form with a sooty brown disc; the forewing of the male more pointed, with longer costal margin and more oblique distal margin; on the underside of the forewing the distal band extends without interruption across the median veins to the hindmargin. The underside of the hindwing has a much purer ground-colour, i. e. there are less clouds and shadows between the various dentate lines which cross the disc. The apical ocellus has a stronger tendency towardsduplication being usually somewhat distorted obliquely and — at least beneath — bearing two pupils. Between this ocellus and the apex there is nearly always a minute eye-dot, there occurring also often specimens with other accessory ocelli. Moreover, the ocelli of the hindwing are as a rule somewhat larger than in the same sex of hiera — A very large material proves that it is hardly possible to find definite trenchant distinctions, especially if one takes into account the large number of local forms of maera, all the various kinds of pattern and coloration exhibiting a great variability.

== Biology ==
The larva eats full-grown grasses, such as Poa annua, Poa bulbosa, Poa pratensis, Festuca ovina, Festuca rubra, Festuca pratensis, Glyceria fluitans, Calamagrostis epigejos, Calamagrostis arundinacea, Calamagrostis varia, Deschampsia flexuosa, Agrostis capillaris, Nardus stricta, Dactylis, Lolium and Hordeum species.

This species has two broods in the northern countries, a single brood in the south. Adults fly from April to September. These butterflies are avid fliers and they are seldom seen in flight in strong wind.

== Gallery ==
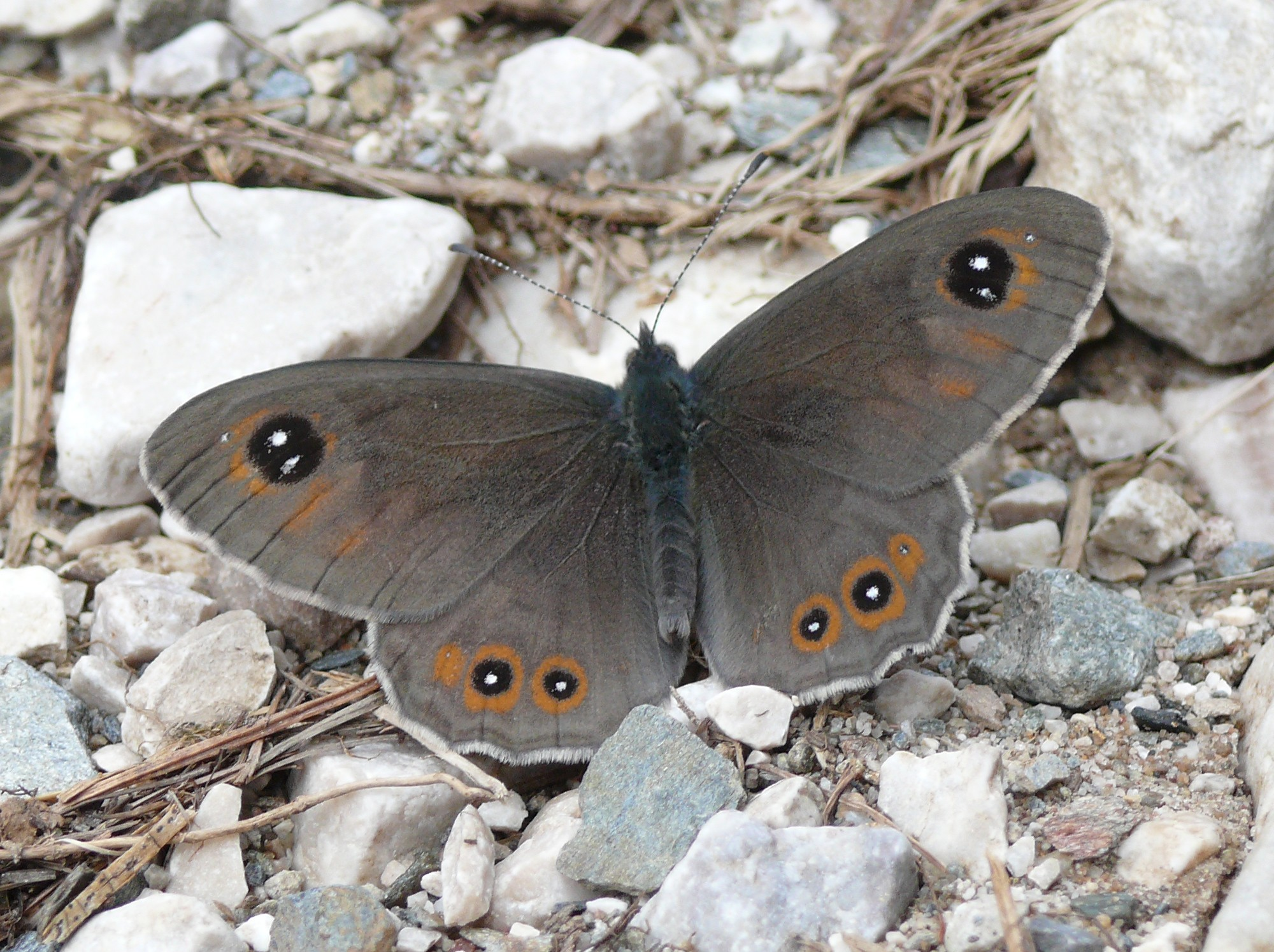
Male

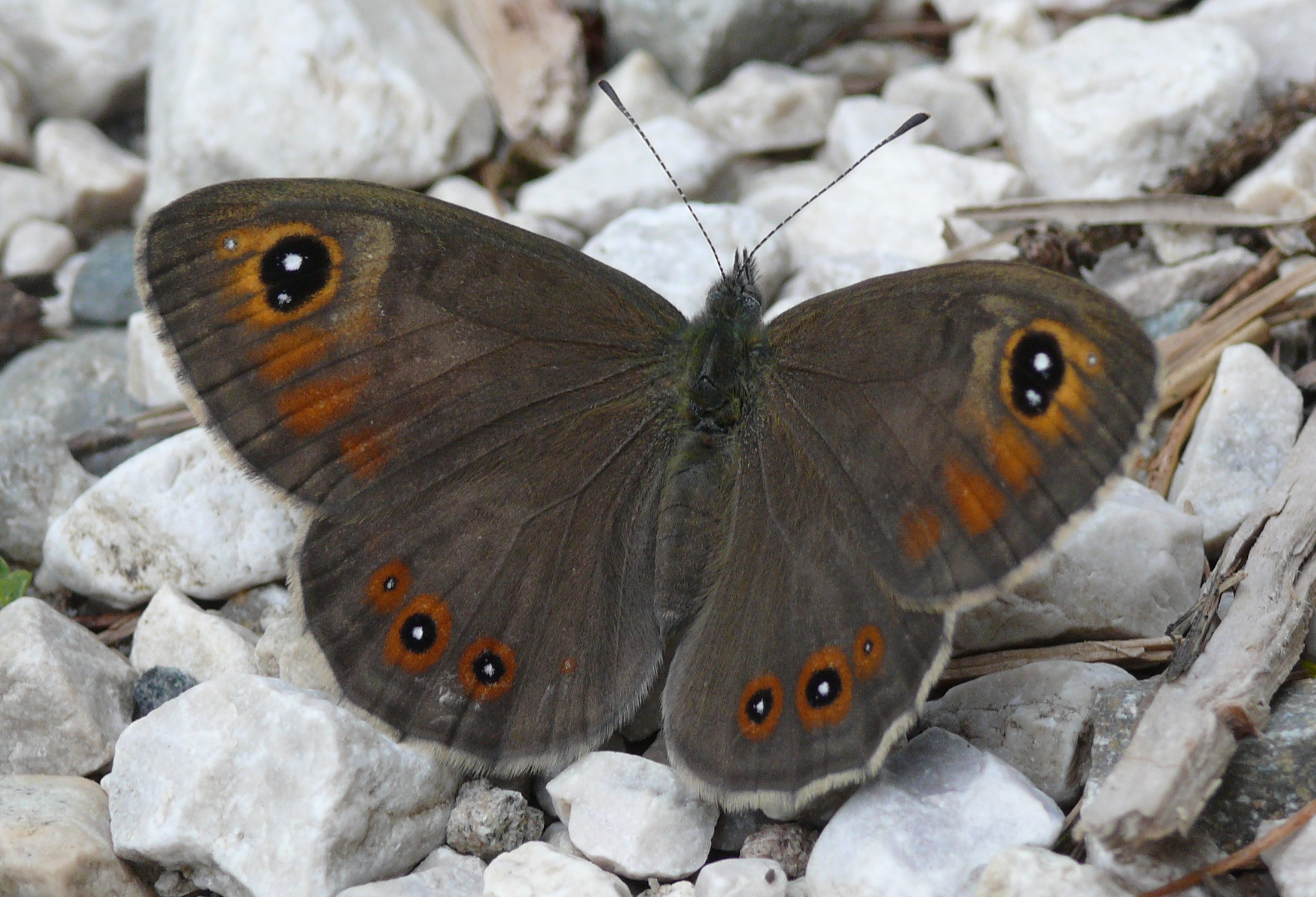
Female
