= Lasiommata pakistana =

Scientific classification
- Kingdom: Animalia
- Phylum: Arthropoda
- Clade: Pancrustacea
- Class: Insecta
- Order: Lepidoptera
- Family: Nymphalidae
- Genus: Lasiommata
- Species: L. pakistana

Binomial name
- Lasiommata pakistana Tshikolovets and Pagès, 2016

Species of butterfly

Lasiommata pakistana, the Pakistan wall, is a butterfly in the family Nymphalidae. It is found in Chitral and Ladakh and was described in 2016.
