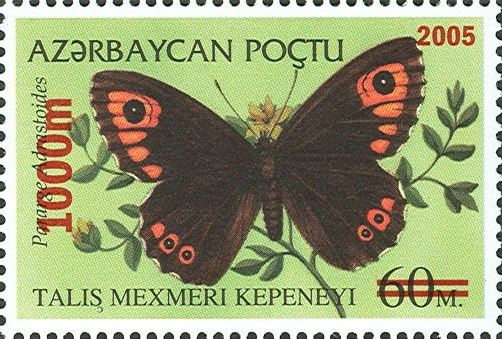
- Lasiommata adrastoides on a stamp from Azerbaijan

Scientific classification
- Kingdom: Animalia
- Phylum: Arthropoda
- Clade: Pancrustacea
- Class: Insecta
- Order: Lepidoptera
- Family: Nymphalidae
- Genus: Lasiommata
- Species: L. adrastoides

Binomial name
- Lasiommata adrastoides (Bienert, 1870)

Synonyms
- Pararge adrastoides Bienert, [1870]

= Lasiommata adrastoides =

Species of butterfly

Lasiommata adrastoides is a butterfly of the family Nymphalidae. It is found in south-eastern Transcaucasia, Azerbaijan and northern Iran. The wingspan is 42–48 millimetres (1.7–1.9 in). The larvae have been recorded on Festuca species.

== Resources ==
- animaldiversity.ummz.umich.edu
- wnsstamps.ch
- fauna.me/species
- zipcodezoo.com/Animals/P/Pararge_adrastoides
