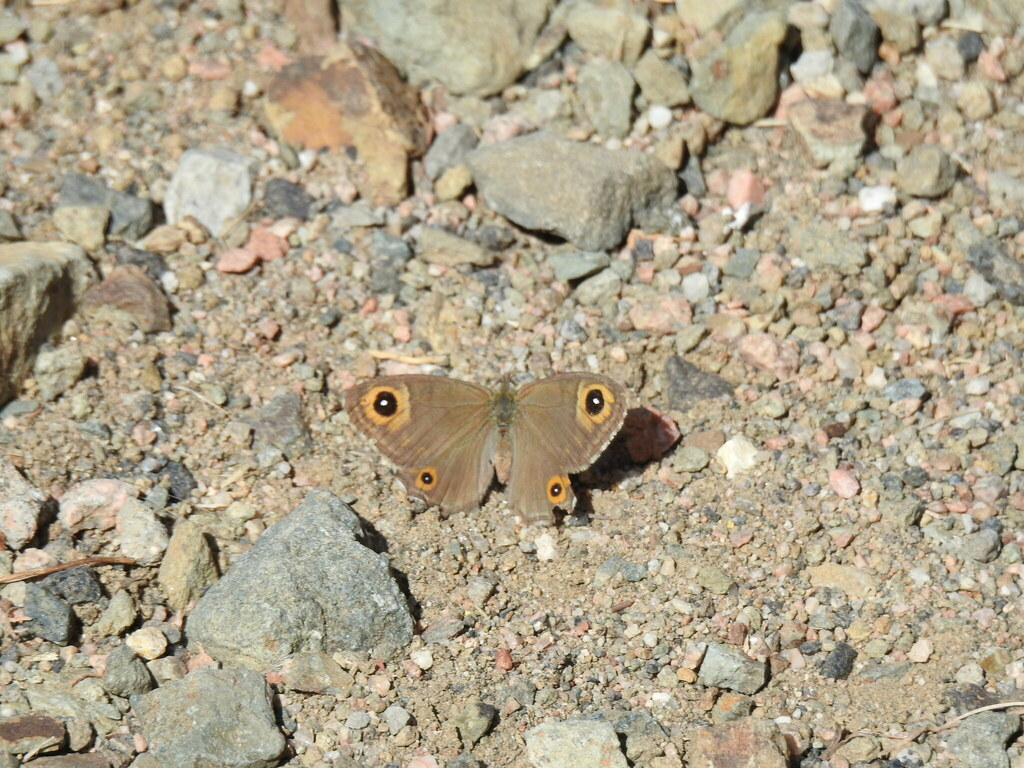

Scientific classification
- Domain: Eukaryota
- Kingdom: Animalia
- Phylum: Arthropoda
- Class: Insecta
- Order: Lepidoptera
- Family: Nymphalidae
- Genus: Lasiommata
- Species: L. felix

Binomial name
- Lasiommata felix (Warnecke, 1929)

Synonyms
- Pararge felix Warnecke, 1929

= Lasiommata felix =

Species of butterfly

Lasiommata felix, the Arabian wall brown, is a butterfly in the family Nymphalidae. It is found in south-western Saudi Arabia and Yemen. The habitat consists of the western escarpment of the Arabian Peninsula.
