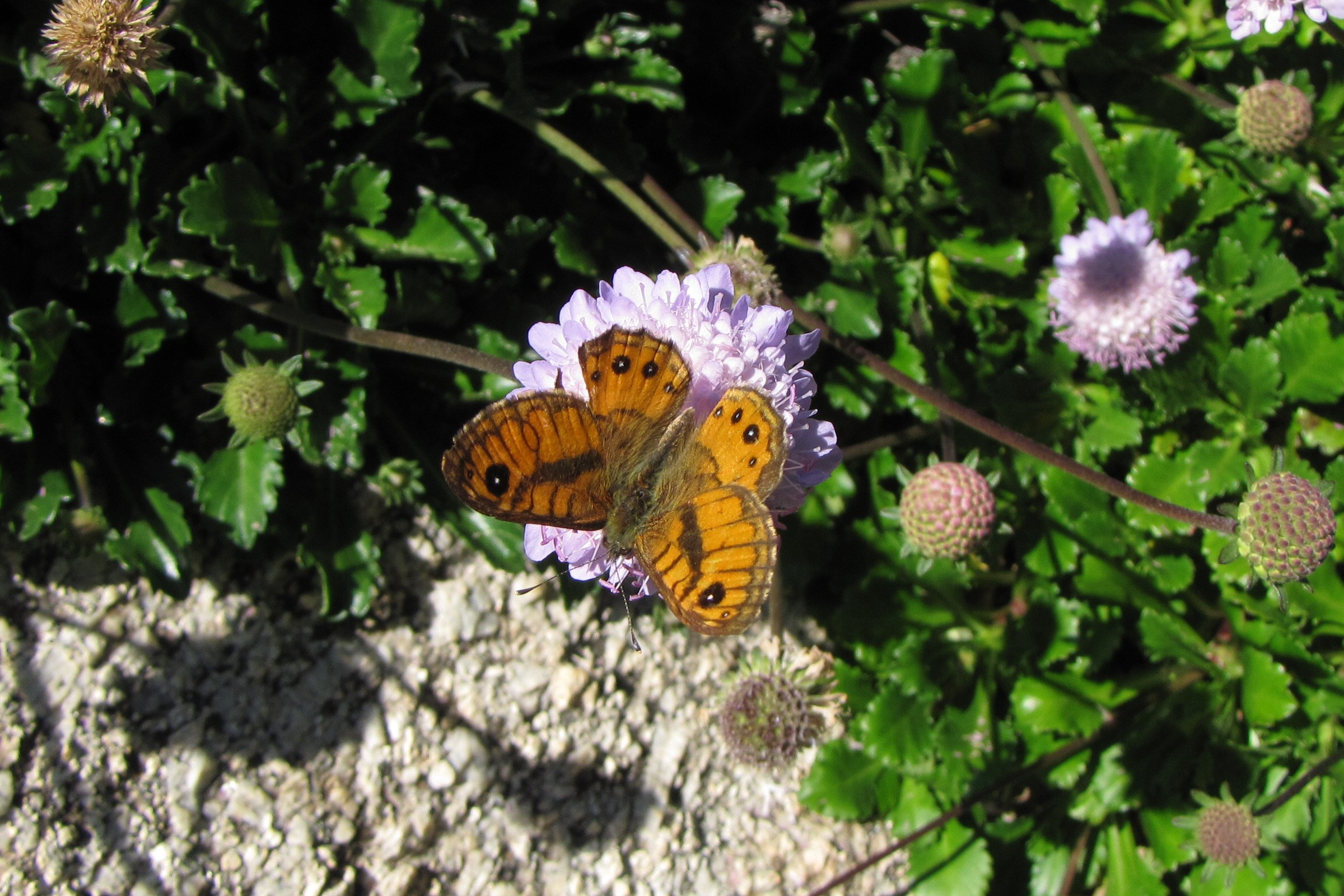

Conservation status
- Least Concern (IUCN 3.1)

Scientific classification
- Kingdom: Animalia
- Phylum: Arthropoda
- Clade: Pancrustacea
- Class: Insecta
- Order: Lepidoptera
- Family: Nymphalidae
- Genus: Lasiommata
- Species: L. paramegaera

Binomial name
- Lasiommata paramegaera (Hübner, 1824)

Synonyms
- Pararge paramegaera; Papilio tigelius Bonelli, 1826

= Lasiommata paramegaera =

Species of butterfly

Lasiommata paramegaera, the pale wall brown or Corsican wall brown, is a butterfly species belonging to the family Nymphalidae. It is endemic to Corsica and Sardinia. The wingspan is 36–40 mm. The upper and undersides of the fore and hind wings are orange brown, they have a dark brown grid-like pattern. The females are often a little lighter colored. Near the apex of the forewing sits a white centred black eye-spot. Between this eye-spot and the outermost apical tip of the fore-wing is another very small black round spot. In the disc region of the top of the forewing, the male has a distinct scent-mark . The upperside of the hind wings has cells 1c, 2, 3, and 4 of the postdiscal region with small black, white-pupilled eye spots on. The underside of the forewings is orange-brown, the underside of the hind wings light brown. On the front wing, the underside pattern corresponds to the upperside. However, the eye spot in the apex is also surrounded by a brown ring.

In the cells 1c - 6 of the underside of the hind wings sit brown, blackened and white pupilled eye spots. Males and females differ relatively clearly in the upperside of the wings. The brown pattern elements are finer in the females than in the males, lacking the scent-mark. Adults are on wing from early April to October in two to three generations.

The larvae feed on Brachypodium phoenicoides and Festuca ovina.

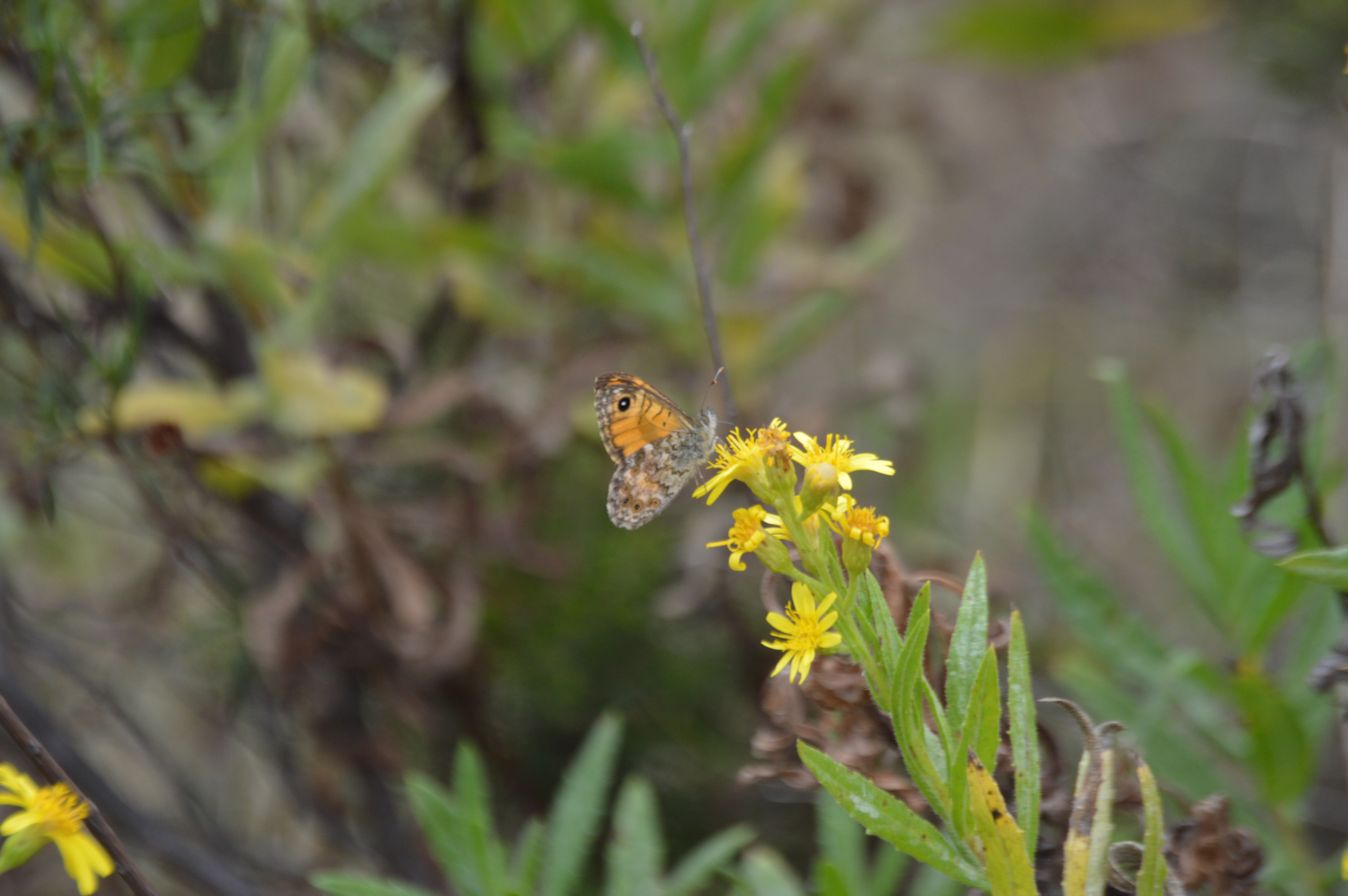
