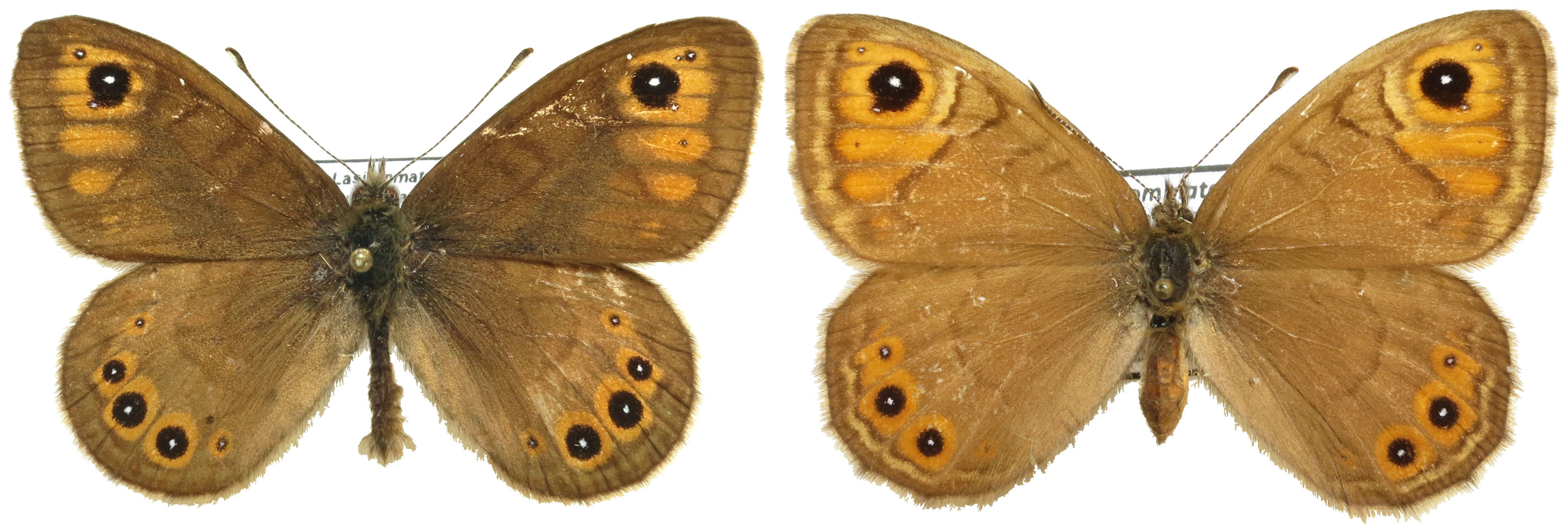
- male and female Malopolskie, Poland
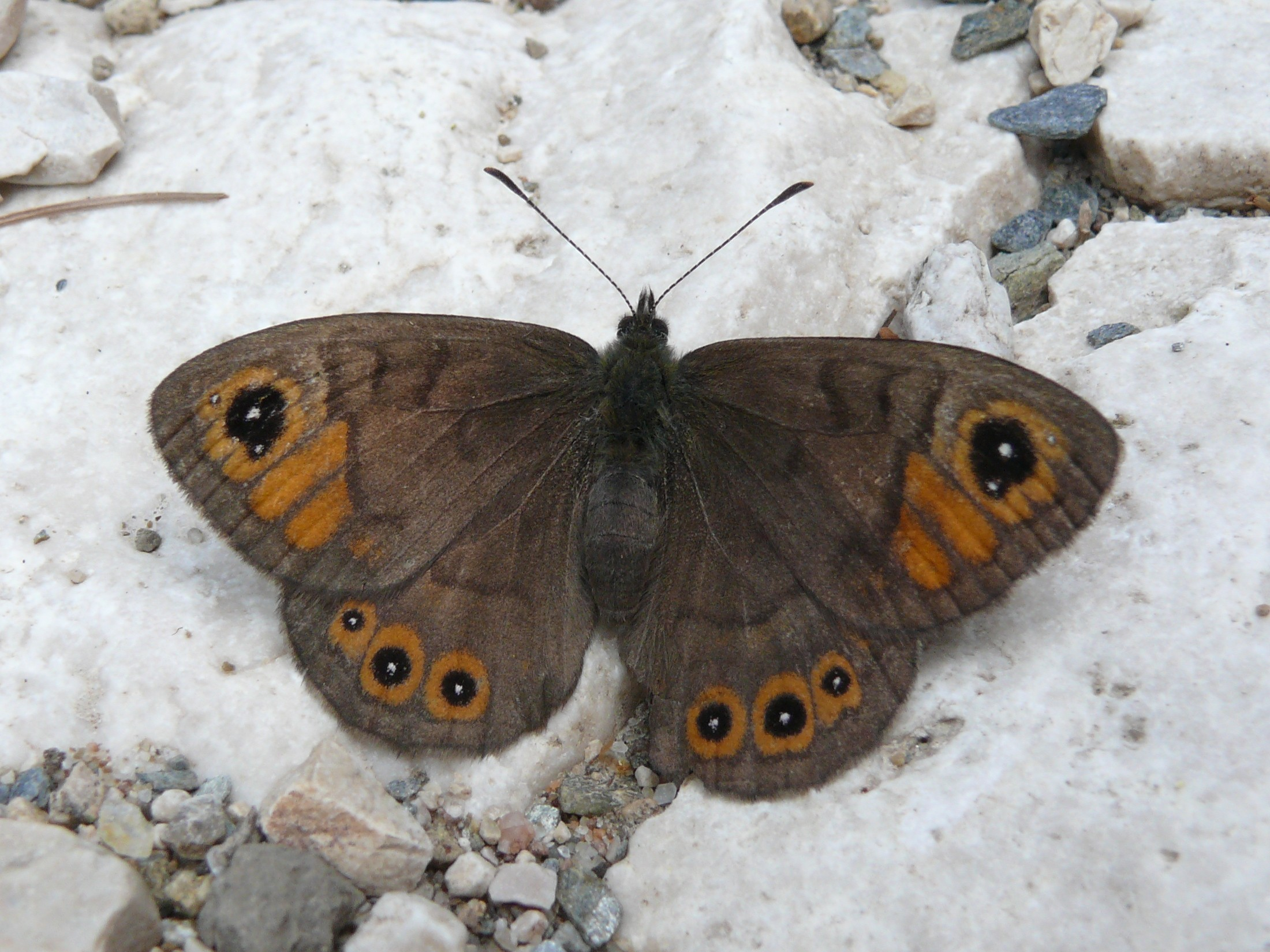
- Female

Scientific classification
- Kingdom: Animalia
- Phylum: Arthropoda
- Clade: Pancrustacea
- Class: Insecta
- Order: Lepidoptera
- Family: Nymphalidae
- Genus: Lasiommata
- Species: L. petropolitana

Binomial name
- Lasiommata petropolitana Fabricius, 1787

= Lasiommata petropolitana =

Species of butterfly

Lasiommata petropolitana, the northern wall brown, is a butterfly species belonging to the family Nymphalidae. It can be found in large parts of Europe, from the Pyrenees and Alps up to Scandinavia and Finland, east to Russia and Siberia.

The males are 19–21 mm.

== Description in Seitz ==
P. hiera F. (45 d). Above very similar to the next species, maera, but always black-brown, of the colour of the darkest maera form, the forewing less pointed, with straighter distal margin; on the underside of the forewing the russet-yellow distal band does not extend without interruption to the anal angle, but stops at the lower median vein or is there interrupted. The apical ocellus, moreover, has less often a double pupil, being mostly quite circular and not always accompanied by a small accessory eye-dot (towards the apex), as is nearly always the case in maera. Besides, hiera is usually of lesser size than the smallest maera, and the black markings, which are very similar to those of maera, shine through on the completely darkened upperside. In the higher mountains of Southern Europe: the Black Forest, Alps, Carpathians, Apennines, and the Balcan; also in Asia Minor, the mountains of Central Asia, the Altai, and the Kentei Mts. Further, in the North and here often in the plains, as for instance in North Russia, Finland, Livonia and Amurland, but also in the mountains of the North, e.g., in Scandinavia. — The northern specimens are on the whole darker and more unicolorous, sometimes almost without markings; Neublieger named such specimens finmarchica. — Larva uniformly green, the dark dorsal line being only distinct posteriorly; on Festuca. The butterflies are on the wing in the plains in May and June, in the high mountains not until June and July, not rare in most places; it affects resting under overhanging rocks and settles on stones and walls; the flight is similar to that of megera and maera.

The butterflies fly in one or two generations from April to September.

The larvae feed on various grasses, mainly Dactylis glomerata, Festuca rubra and Festuca ovina.
