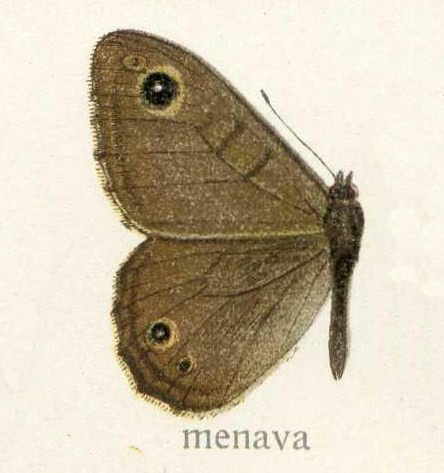

Scientific classification
- Kingdom: Animalia
- Phylum: Arthropoda
- Class: Insecta
- Order: Lepidoptera
- Family: Nymphalidae
- Genus: Lasiommata
- Species: L. menava

Binomial name
- Lasiommata menava (Moore, 1865)

= Lasiommata menava =

Dark wall

Species of butterfly

Lasiommata menava, the dark wall, is a species of satyrine butterfly found from Asia Minor across Transcaucasia and the mountains of Central Asia to the Hindu Kush and the north-western Himalayas.
