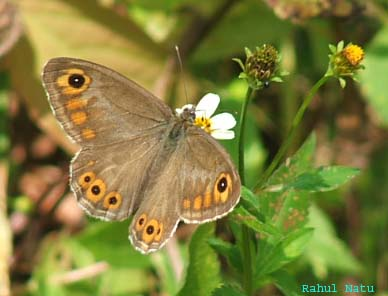

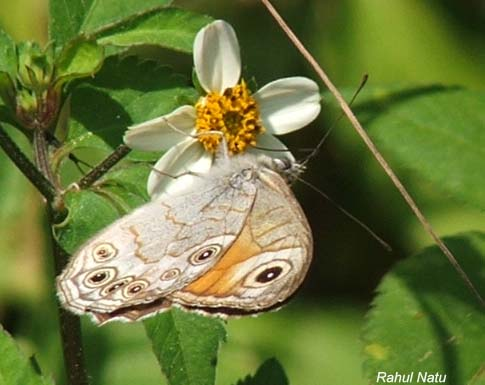

Scientific classification
- Kingdom: Animalia
- Phylum: Arthropoda
- Class: Insecta
- Order: Lepidoptera
- Family: Nymphalidae
- Genus: Lasiommata
- Species: L. schakra

Binomial name
- Lasiommata schakra (Kollar, 1844)

Synonyms
- Pararge schakra; Satyrus schakra

= Lasiommata schakra =

Common wall

Species of butterfly

Lasiommata schakra, the common wall, is a species of satyrine butterfly found in South Asia.

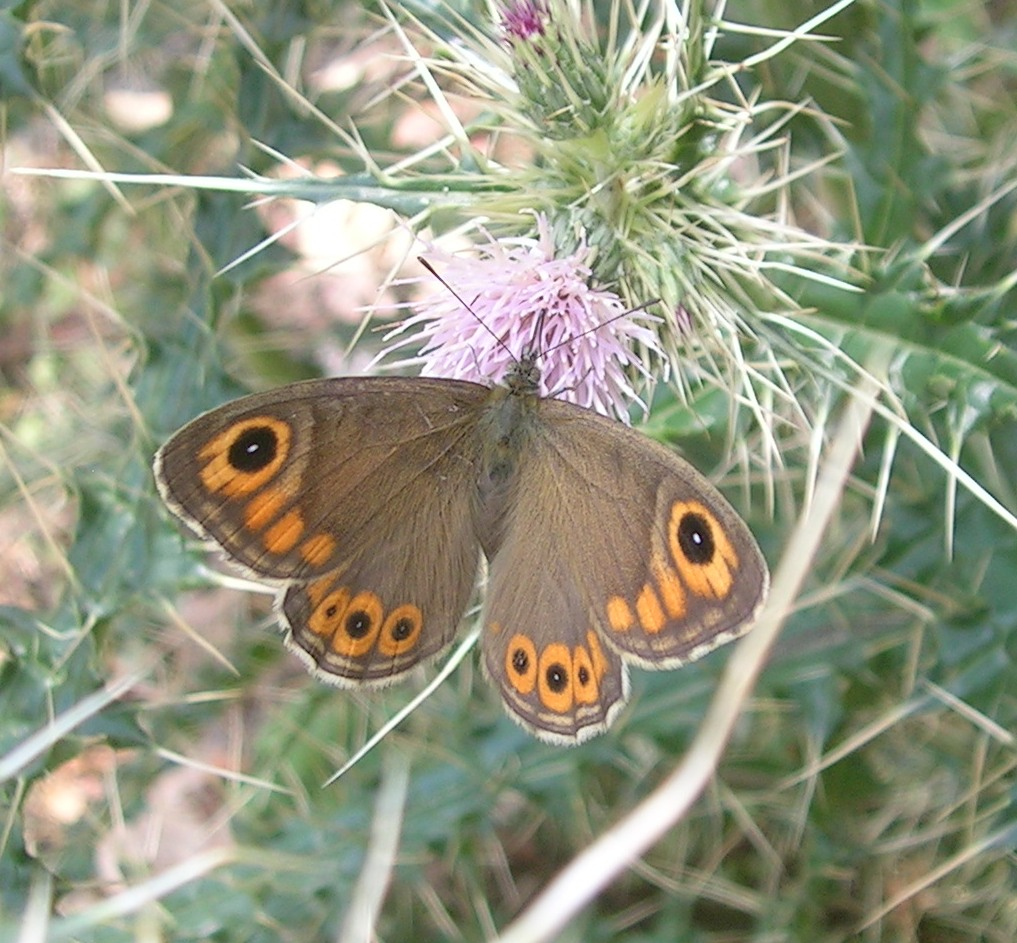

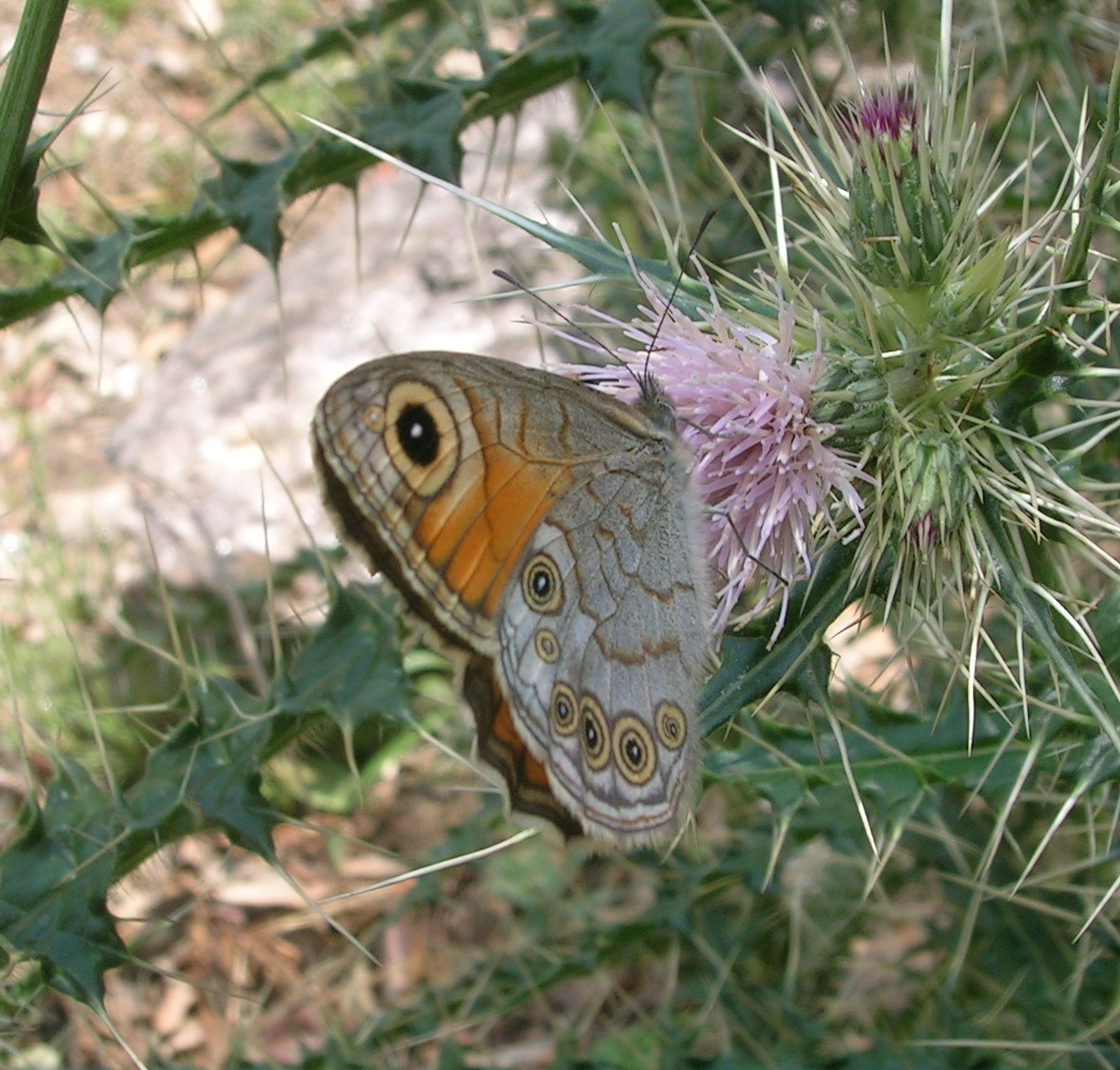

== Description ==
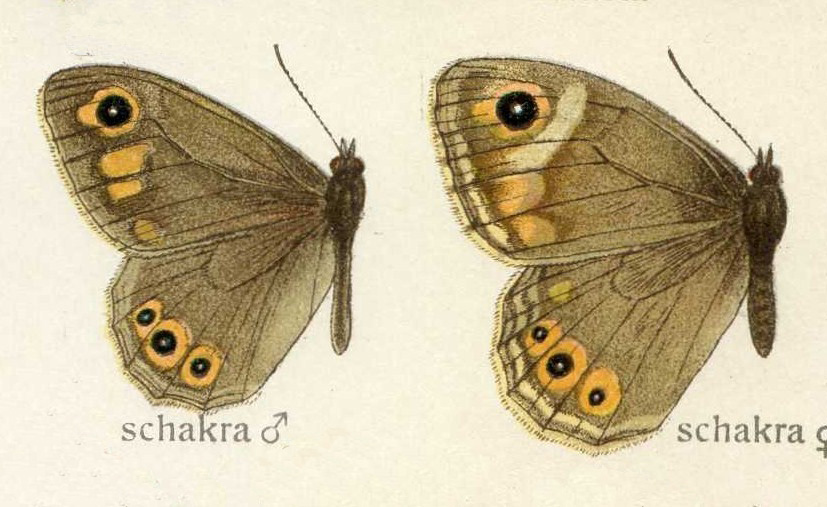
Uppersides, male left, female right

The butterfly shows slight differences between males and females. The male has silky brown wings with white edges. Its forewings have four large orange spots, with the biggest one near the tip containing a black-and-white eyespot. There’s also a dark brown line near the edge. The hindwings are mostly uniform but have a row of three to six small black eyespots with orange rings.

The underside is a pale greyish white. The forewings have an orange patch outlined by a dark line, plus a few wavy brown lines and a smaller eyespot near the tip. The hindwings have thin curved brown lines and the same row of eyespots, but with extra pale and dark rings.

The antennae are brown, the head and thorax have long dark grey hairs, and the abdomen is pale brown. Males have a small sex-mark.

Female is similar but on the upperside, the orange spot bearing the ocellus on the forewing inwardly bordered by a broad, pale, short line; the raised band of specialized scales absent.

It has a wingspan of 56–58 mm.

== Distribution ==
The Himalayas eastwards to Sikkim.
