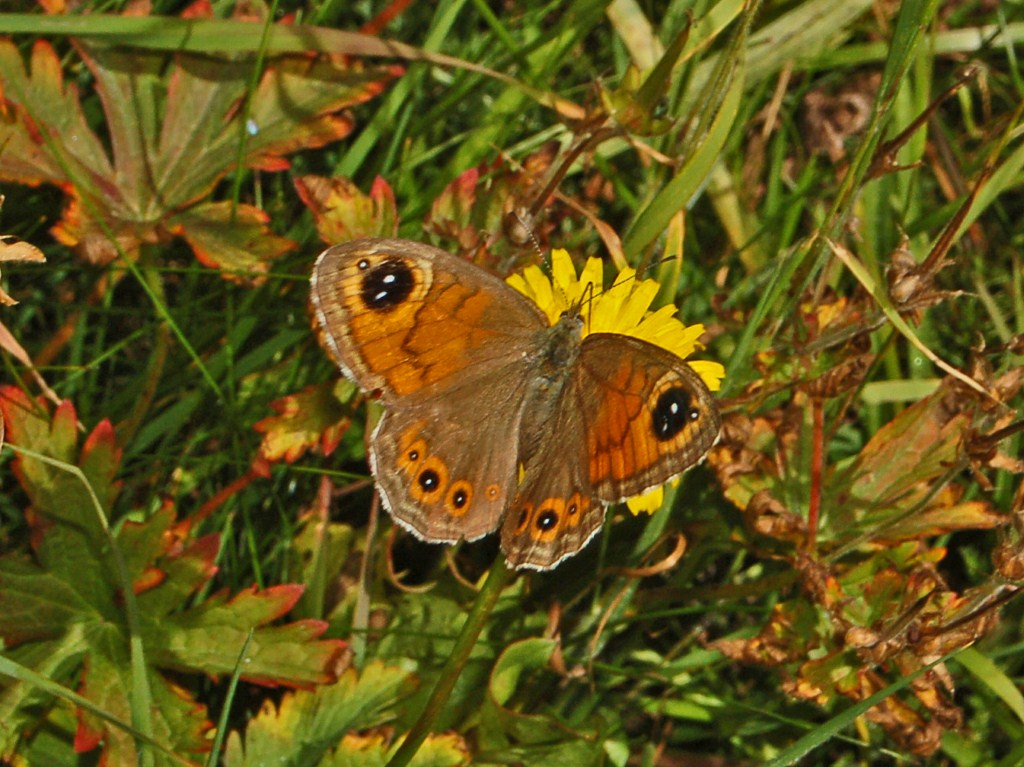
- Lasiommata maera

Scientific classification
- Kingdom: Animalia
- Phylum: Arthropoda
- Class: Insecta
- Order: Lepidoptera
- Family: Nymphalidae
- Subfamily: Satyrinae
- Tribe: Satyrini
- Subtribe: Parargina
- Genus: Lasiommata; Westwood, 1841

Species
- See text

Synonyms
- Amecera Butler, 1867

= Lasiommata =

Genus of butterflies

Lasiommata is a genus of butterflies of the subfamily Satyrinae in the family Nymphalidae.

== Species ==
- Lasiommata adrastoides (Bienert, [1870]) – Caucasus
- Lasiommata deidamia (Eversmann, 1851) – China [=Lopinga deidamia in some schemes]
- Lasiommata felix (Warnecke, 1929) – Arabia
- Lasiommata hefengana Chou & Zhang, 1994 – China (Xinjiang)
- Lasiommata hindukushica (Wyatt & Omoto, 1966) – Afghanistan
- Lasiommata kasumi Yoshino, 1995 – China
- Lasiommata maderakal (Guérin-Méneville, 1849) – Ethiopia
- Lasiommata meadewaldoi (Rothschild, 1917) – Morocco
- Lasiommata maera (Linnaeus, 1758) – Europe, Caucasus, Middle East
- Lasiommata maerula C. & R. Felder, [1867] – India (Himachal Pradesh, Kashmir)
- Lasiommata majuscula (Leech, [1892]) – China
- Lasiommata megera (Linnaeus, 1767) – Europe, Caucasus, Middle East
- Lasiommata menava Moore, 1865 – Caucasus, India (Kashmir)
- Lasiommata minuscula (Oberthür, 1923) – China
- Lasiommata paramegaera (Hübner, 1824) – Sardinia, Corsica
- Lasiommata petropolitana (Fabricius, 1787) – Eurasia
- Lasiommata schakra (Kollar, [1844]) – India (Kashmir)
- Lasiommata zagrossica Lukhtanov & Dantchenko, 2004 – Iran

== Gallery ==
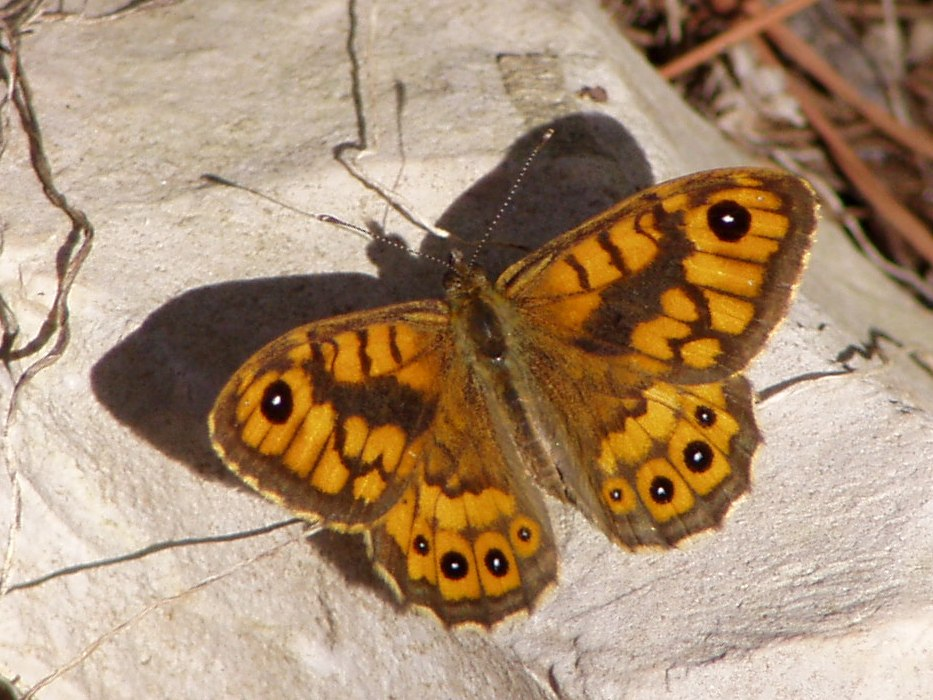
Lasiommata megera

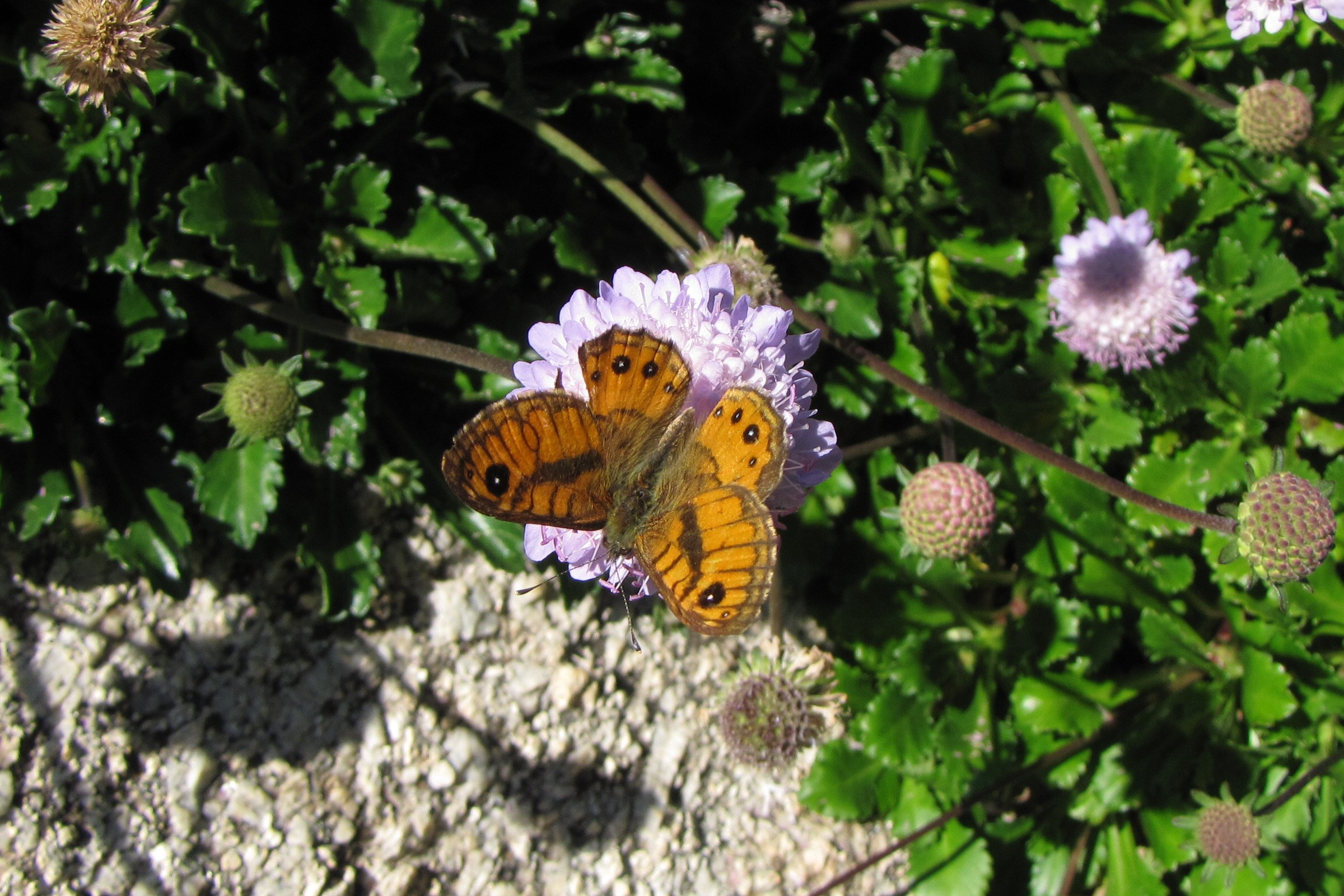
Lasiommata paramegaera

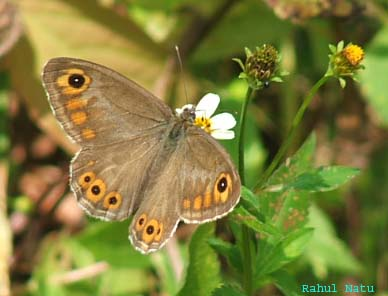
Lasiommata schakra

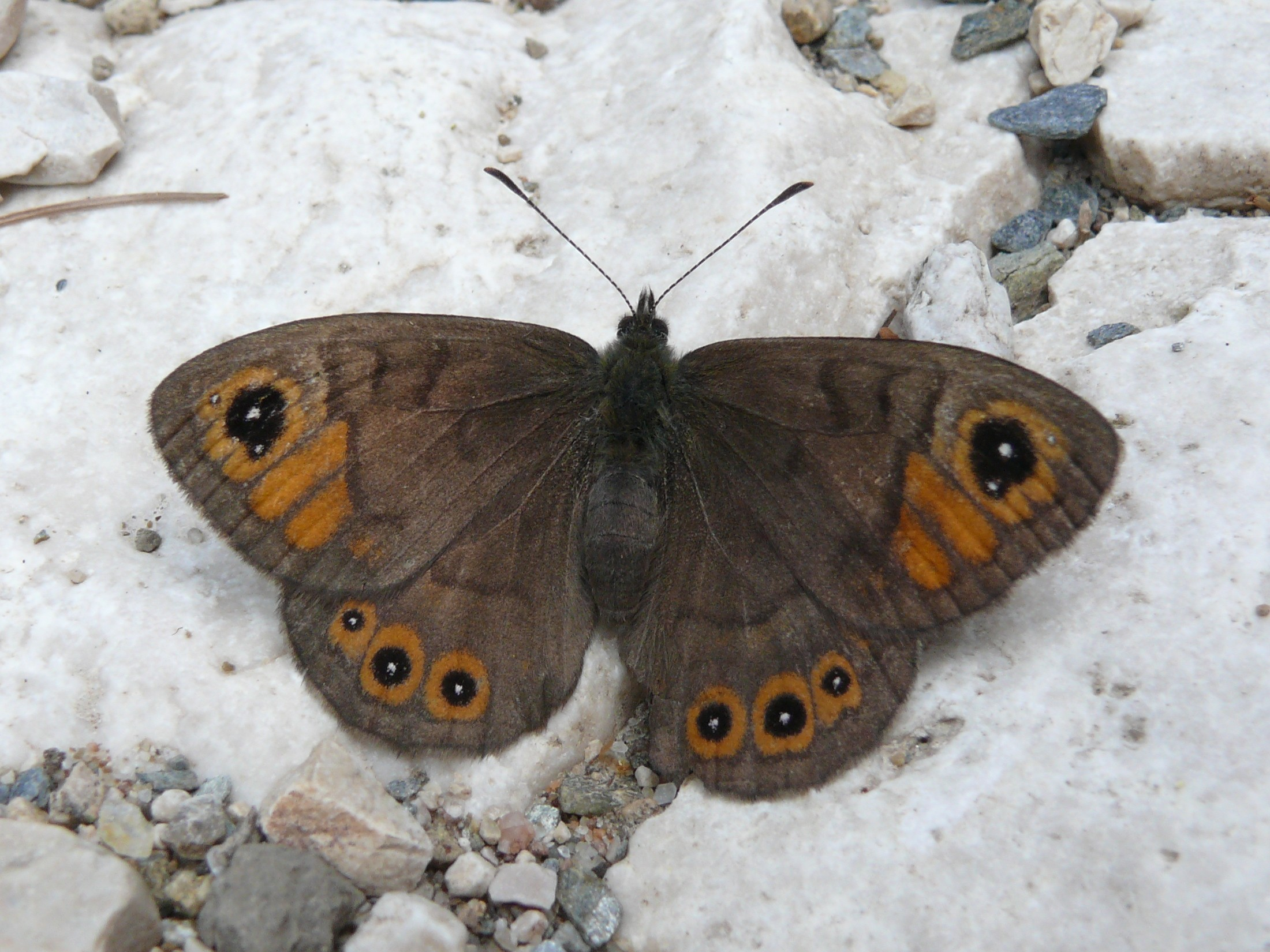
Lasiommata petropolitana
