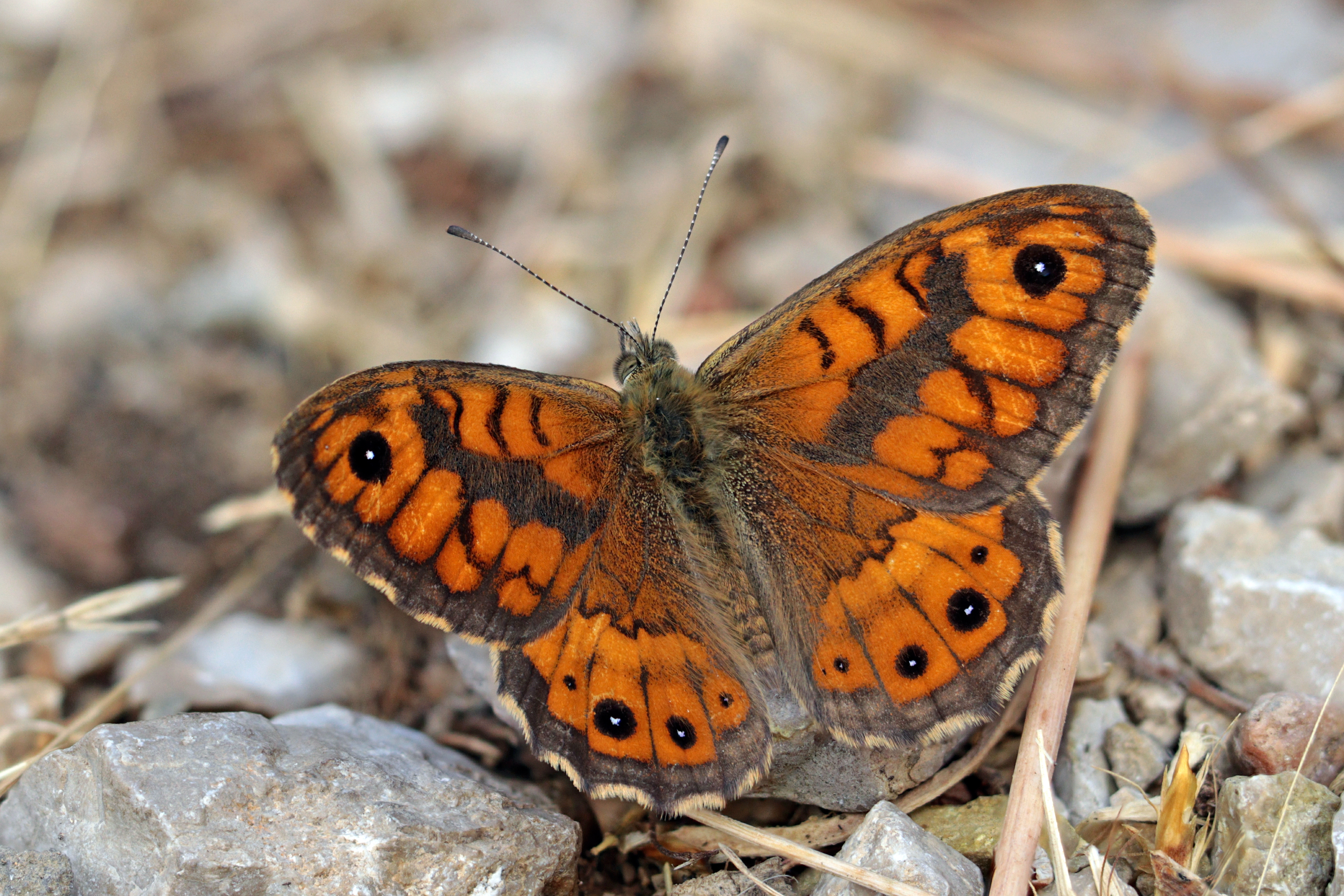
- Male; Sorrento Peninsula, Italy
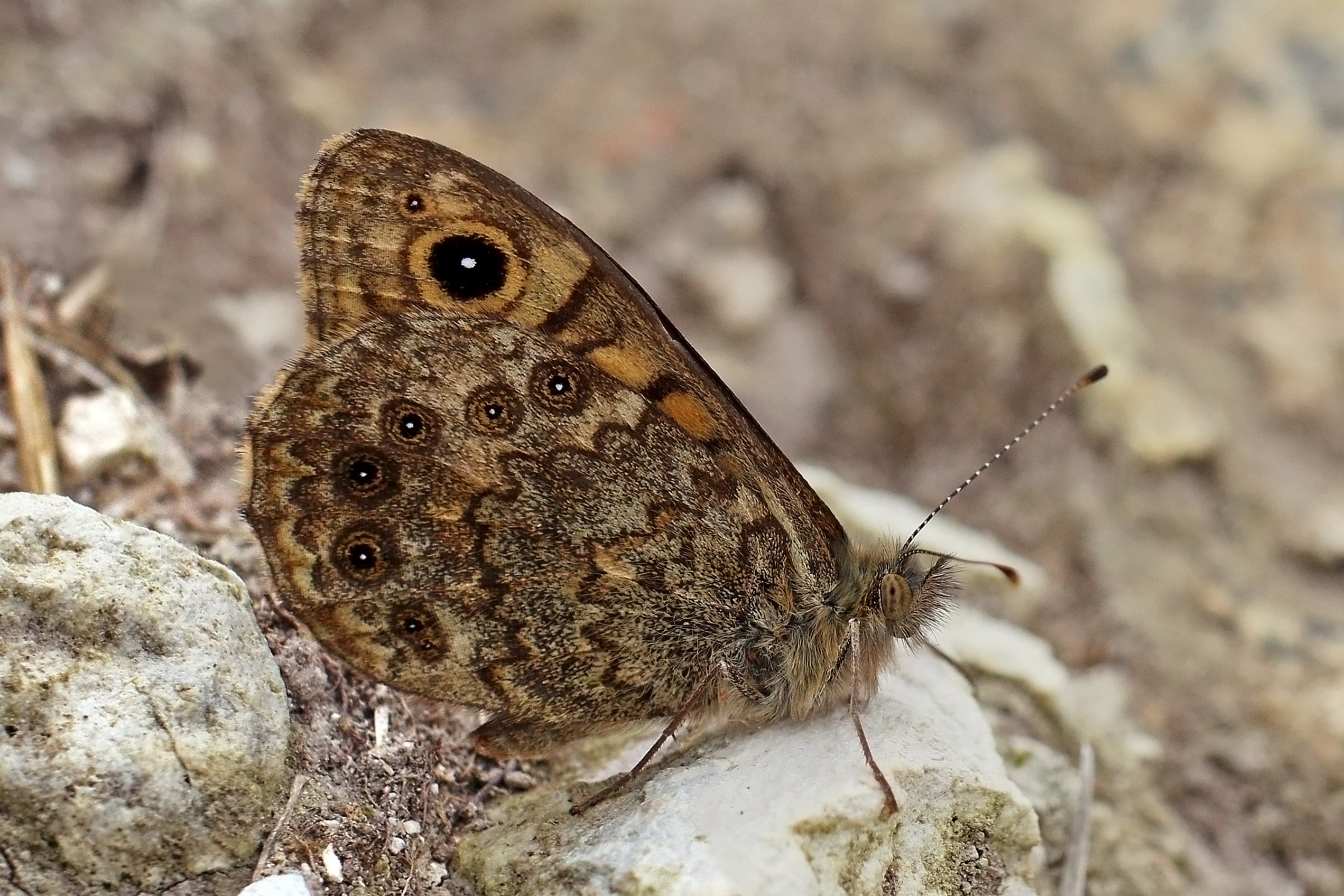
- Male; Pewsey Downs, Wiltshire, UK

Conservation status
- Least Concern (IUCN 3.1)

Scientific classification
- Kingdom: Animalia
- Phylum: Arthropoda
- Class: Insecta
- Order: Lepidoptera
- Family: Nymphalidae
- Genus: Lasiommata
- Species: L. megera

Binomial name
- Lasiommata megera (Linnaeus, 1767)

Synonyms
- Papilio megera Linnaeus, 1767; Dira megera (Linnaeus, 1767); Pararge megaera (Linnaeus, 1767); Satyrus megaera (Linnaeus, 1767); Satyrus maegera (Linnaeus, 1767)

= Lasiommata megera =

Wall brown

Species of butterfly

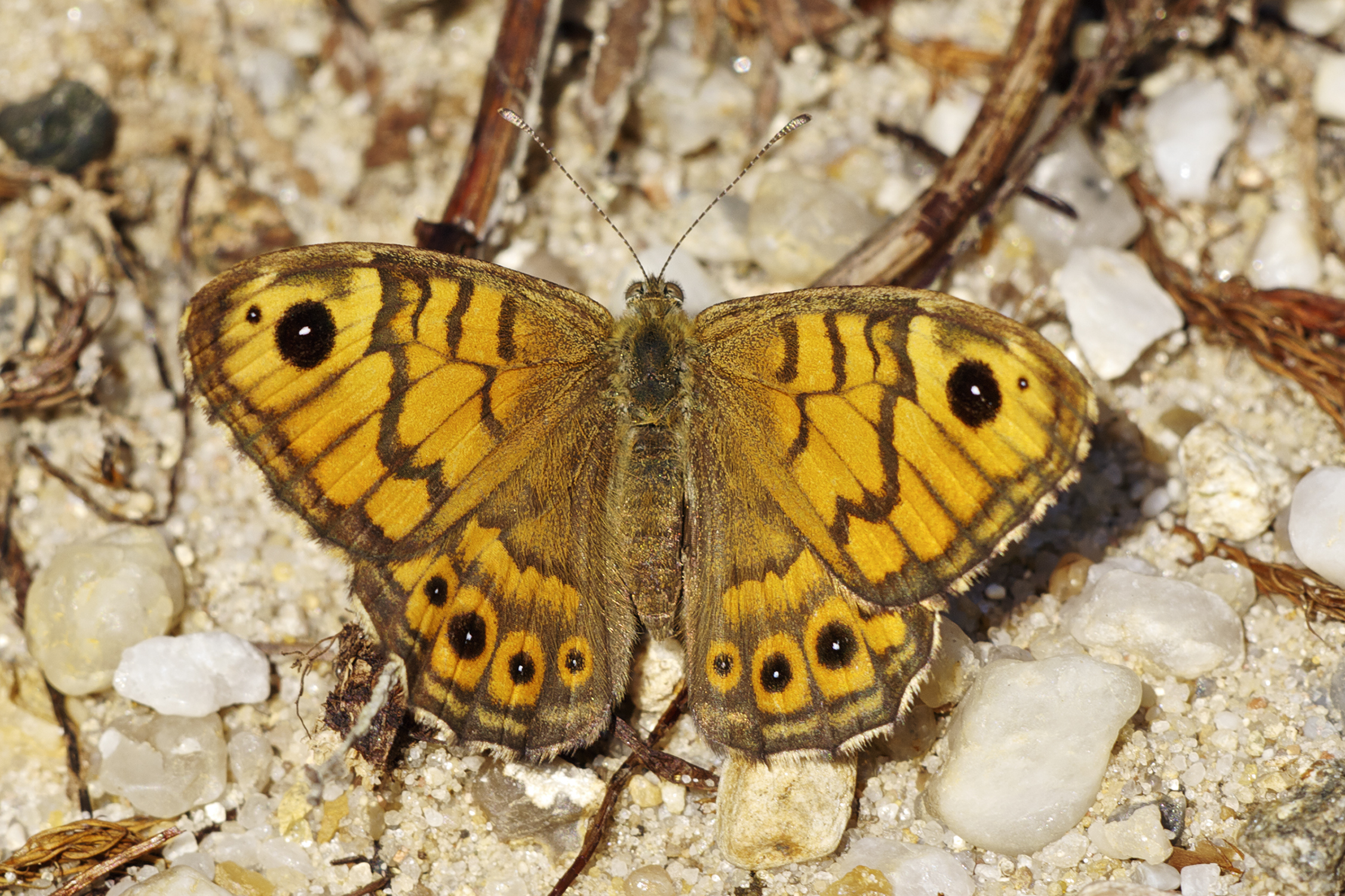
Female Chemnitz, Germany

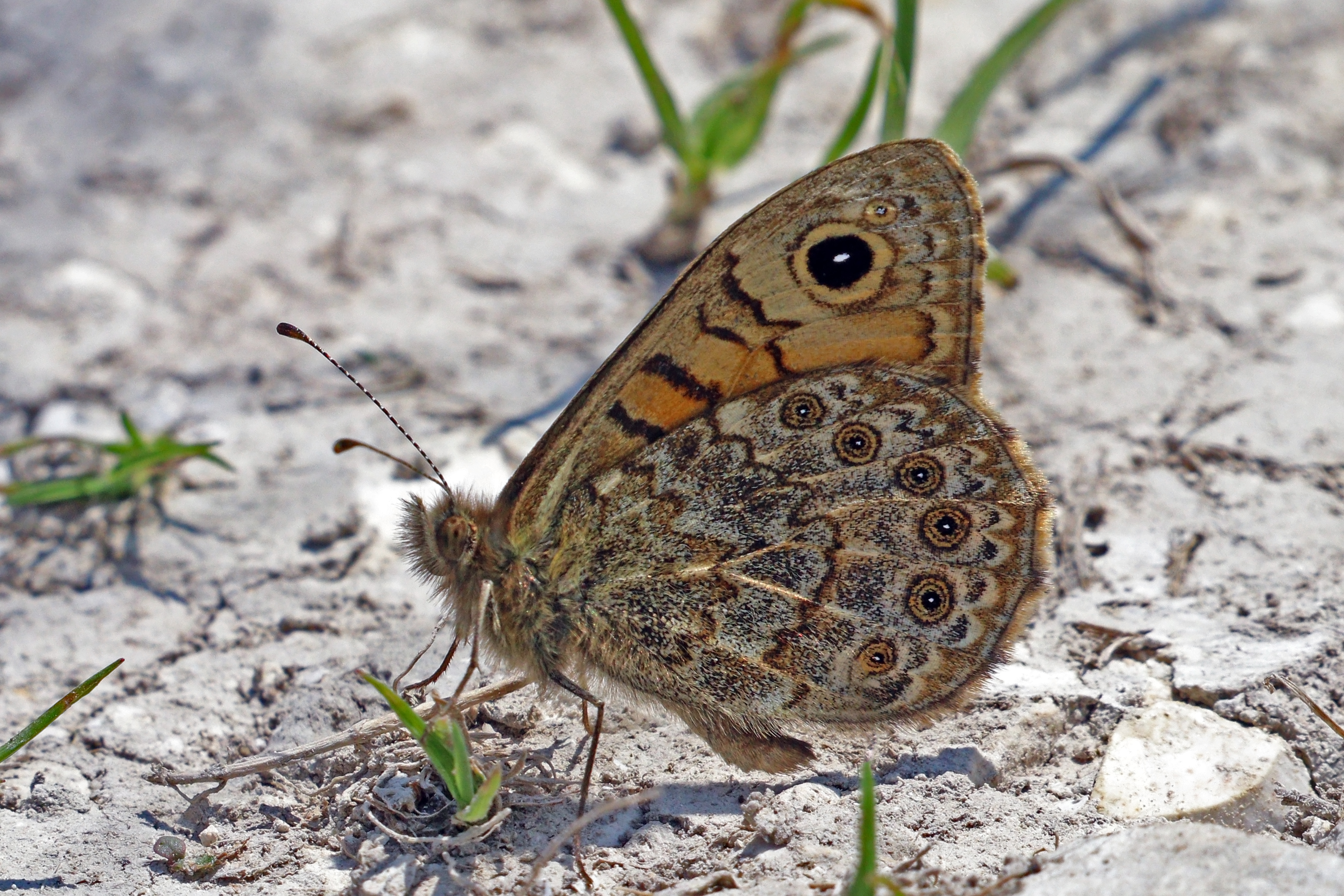
Female Scratchbury and Cotley Hills SSSI, Wiltshire

Lasiommata megera, the wall or wall brown, is a butterfly in the family Nymphalidae (subfamily Satyrinae). It is widespread in the Palearctic realm with a large variety of habitats and number of generations a year.

== Description ==
P. megera L. [— xiphie Boisd. pt (45d). Above reddish yellow, with a black mark which traverses the distal band from the cell of the forewing to the abdominal margin of the hindwing, short black stripes crossing the disc and the cell of the forewing.

== Range ==
The species lives in North Africa, Europe, the Caucasus, Asia Minor, the Middle East, western Siberia, northern Tian Shan, Dzungarian Alatau, Kazakhstan and Dzungaria.

== Habitats ==
Habitats include forest edges and clearings, shrubby areas in ravines and river valleys and sparse woodlands. It is also found in mountain habitats up to 0–3,000 metres (0–9,843 ft) above sea level.

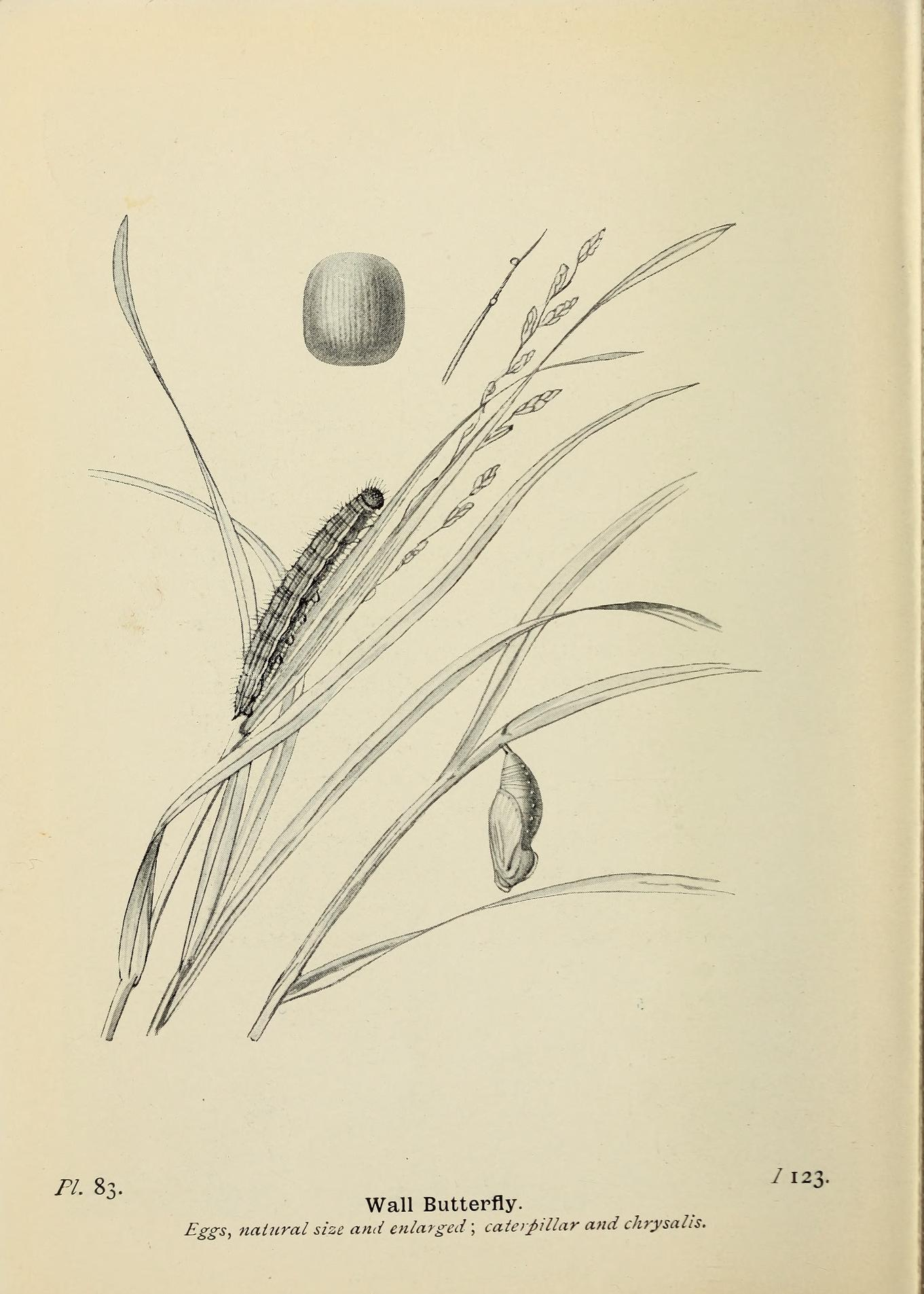
Egg, larva and pupa

== Life history ==
The imago flies from April to October in two or three generations depending on locality and altitude. The larva feeds on grasses in the genera Festuca, Bromus, Deschampsia, Poa, Dactylis and Brachypodium.

"The egg is pale green when first laid, and in shape it is almost spherical, but rather higher than broad; it is finely ribbed and reticulated, but unless examined through a lens it appears to be quite smooth. The caterpillar when full grown is whitish-green, dotted with white. From the larger of these dots on the back arise greyish bristles; the three lines on the back (dorsal and sub-dorsal) are whitish, edged with dark green; the line on the sides (spiracular) is white, fringed with greyish hairs; anal points green, hairy, extreme tips white. Head larger than the first ring (first thoracic segment), green dotted with white and hairy, jaws marked with brownish. The chrysalis is green, with yellow-tinted white markings on the edge of the wing covers and ridges; the spots on the body are yellowish, or sometimes white. Occasionally the chrysalids are blackish, with white or yellow points on the body". (South 1906)

== Subspecies ==
- L. m. megera
- L. m. vividissima
- L. m. megerina (Herrich-Schäffer, 1856) – Transcaucasia
- L. m. transcaspica (Staudinger, 1901) – Turkmenia
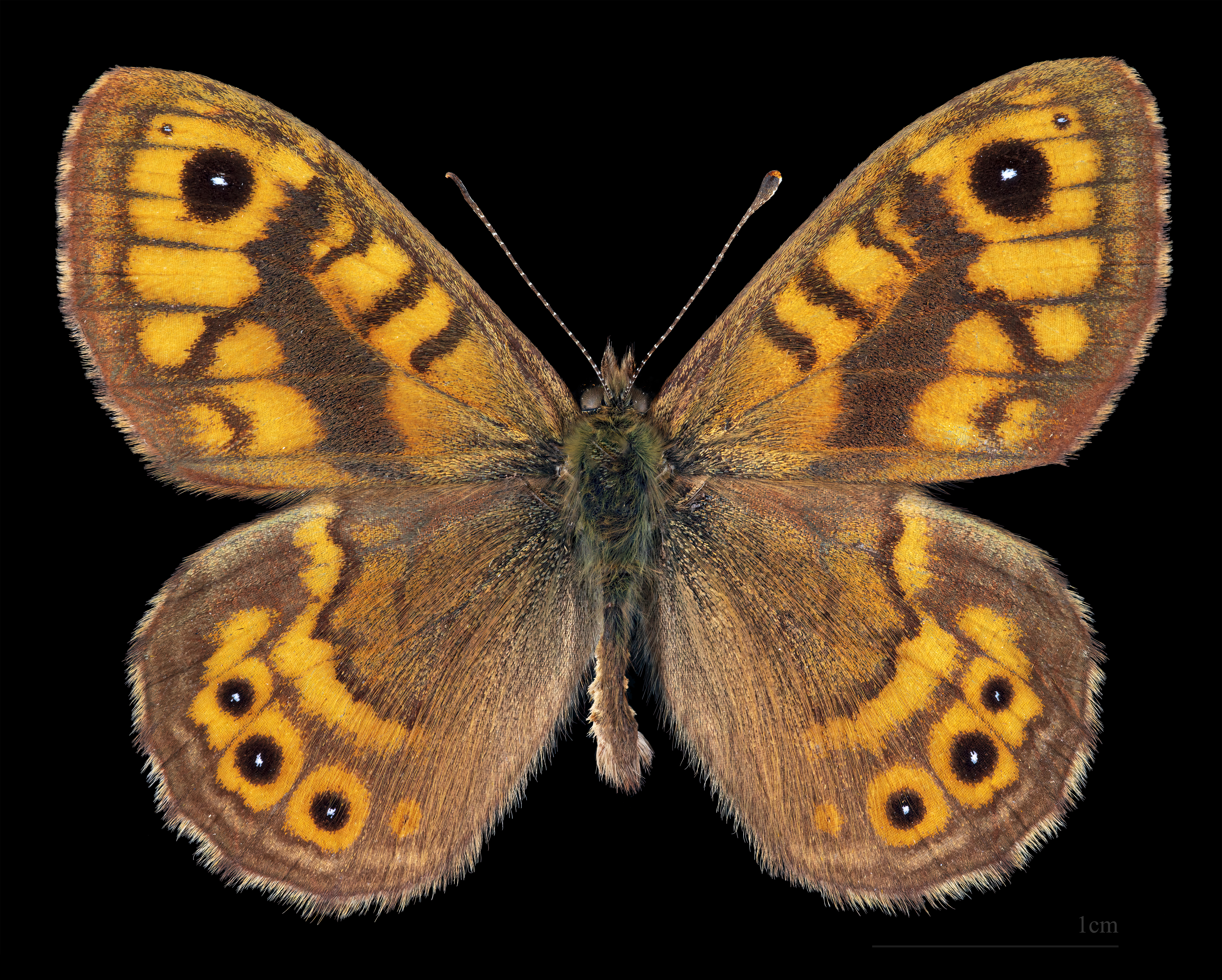
Lasiommata megera megera ♂

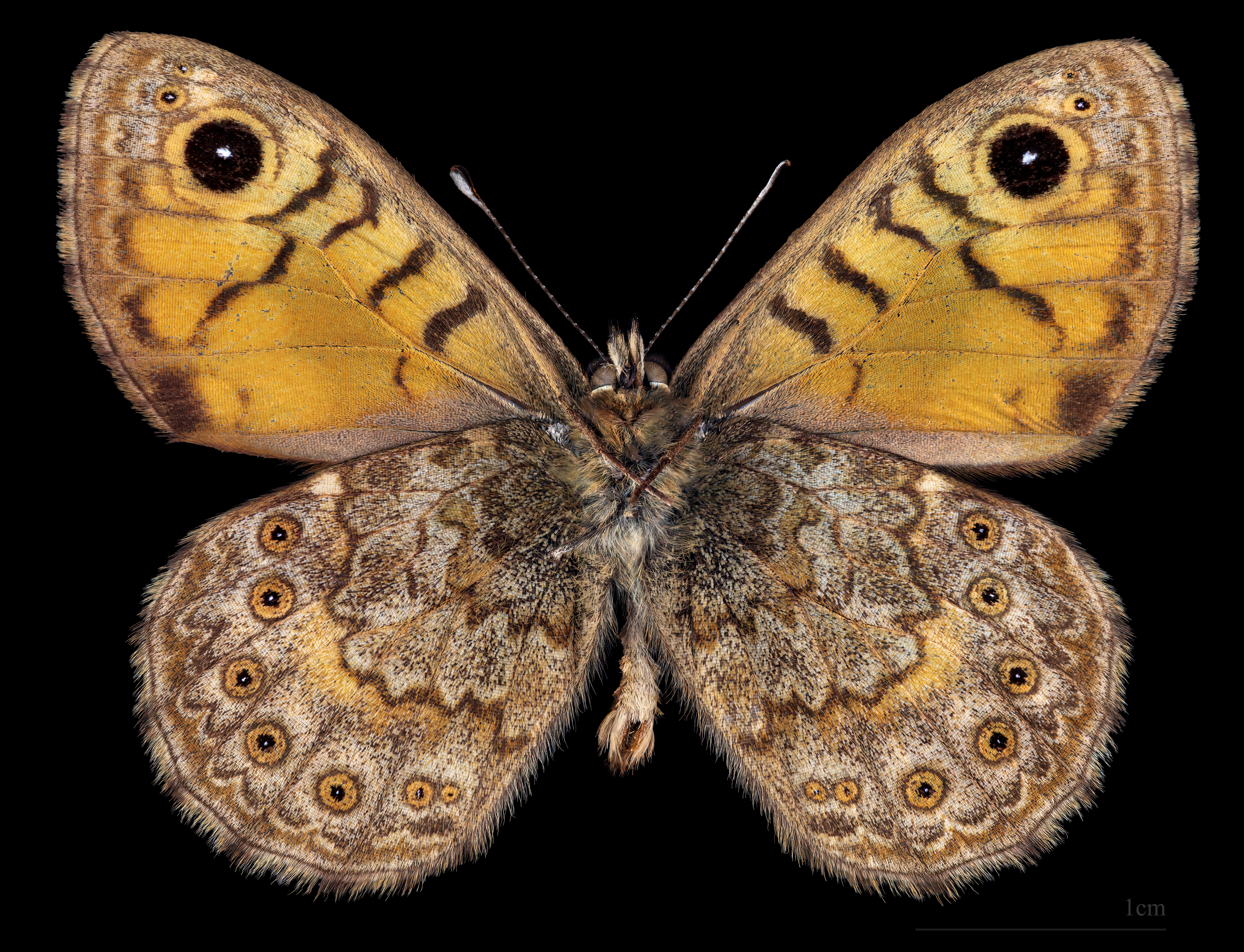
♂ △

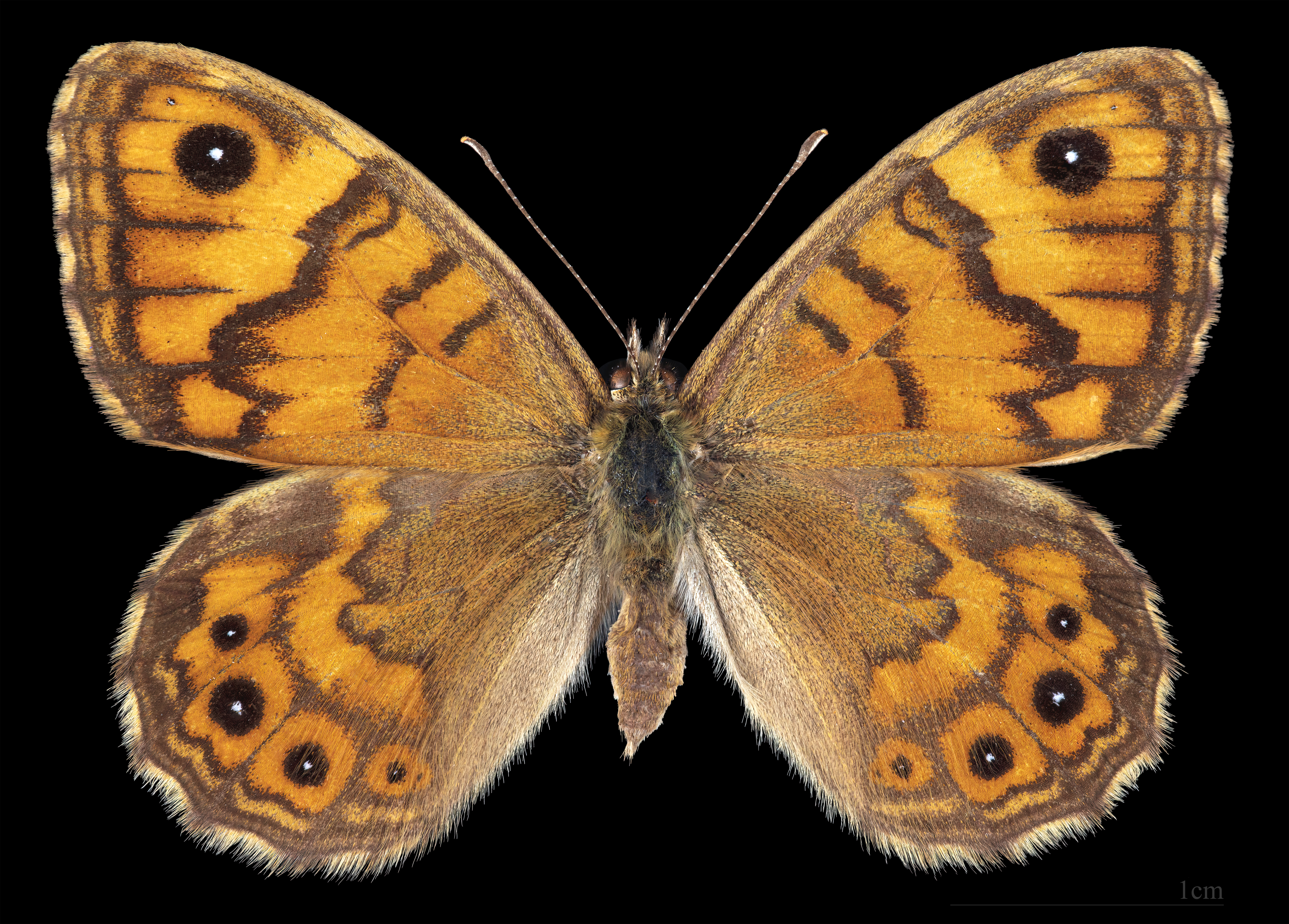
♀

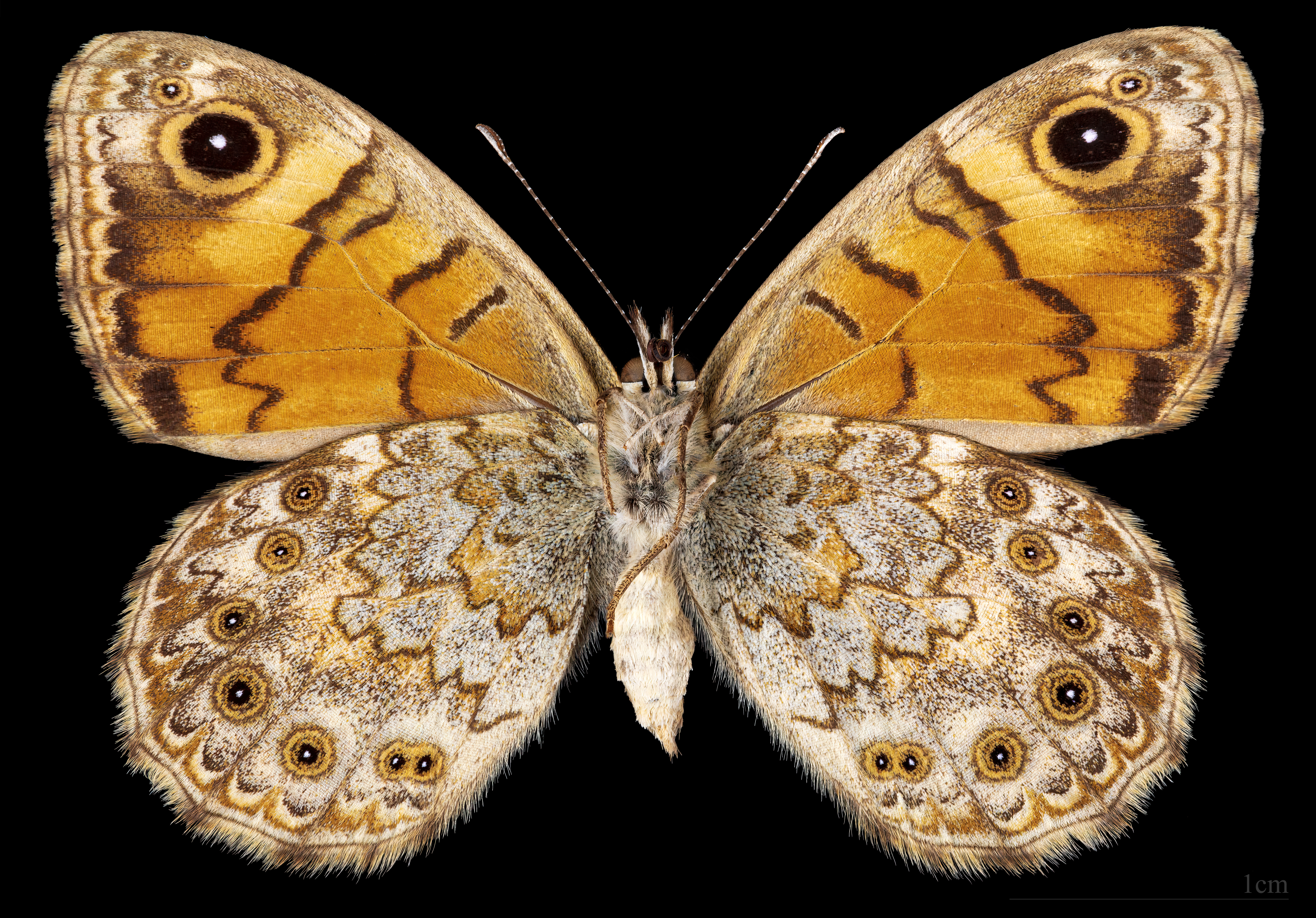
♀ △

== Size ==
Size: 36–50 millimetres (1.4–2.0 in)
