= Chazara prieuri =

Scientific classification
- Kingdom: Animalia
- Phylum: Arthropoda
- Clade: Pancrustacea
- Class: Insecta
- Order: Lepidoptera
- Family: Nymphalidae
- Genus: Chazara
- Species: C. prieuri

Binomial name
- Chazara prieuri (Pierret, 1837)

Synonyms
- Satyrus prieuri Pierret, 1837; Satyrus prieuri kebira Wyatt, 1952

Species of butterfly

Chazara prieuri, the southern hermit, is a butterfly species belonging to the family Nymphalidae. It can be found in Morocco and Spain.

The wingspan is 45–60 mm. The adult flies in July and August, depending on the location. In Morocco it may emerge by mid-June.

The larva feeds on the grass Lygeum spartum.

== Description in Seitz ==
Satyrus prieuri Pier. (42 d, e). This butterfly resembles the preceding species above [ heydenreichi ], but the transverse patch of white streaks which extends across the forewing above the apical ocellus does not reach the costa; the oval blotch in the cell of the forewing is so strongly shaded with brown that it contrasts but slightly with the ground-colour, and the white discal band is somewhat more distinct than in heydenreichi, though it has no smear-like projection towards the base. The underside of the hindwing, particularly in the female, is more extensively, though less distinctly, spotted with greyish brown, so that it approaches to a certain extent that of semele, the angulated spots not appearing so conspicuous as in briseis and heydenreichi.
