= List of butterflies of Kazakhstan =

List of butterflies in Kazakhstan

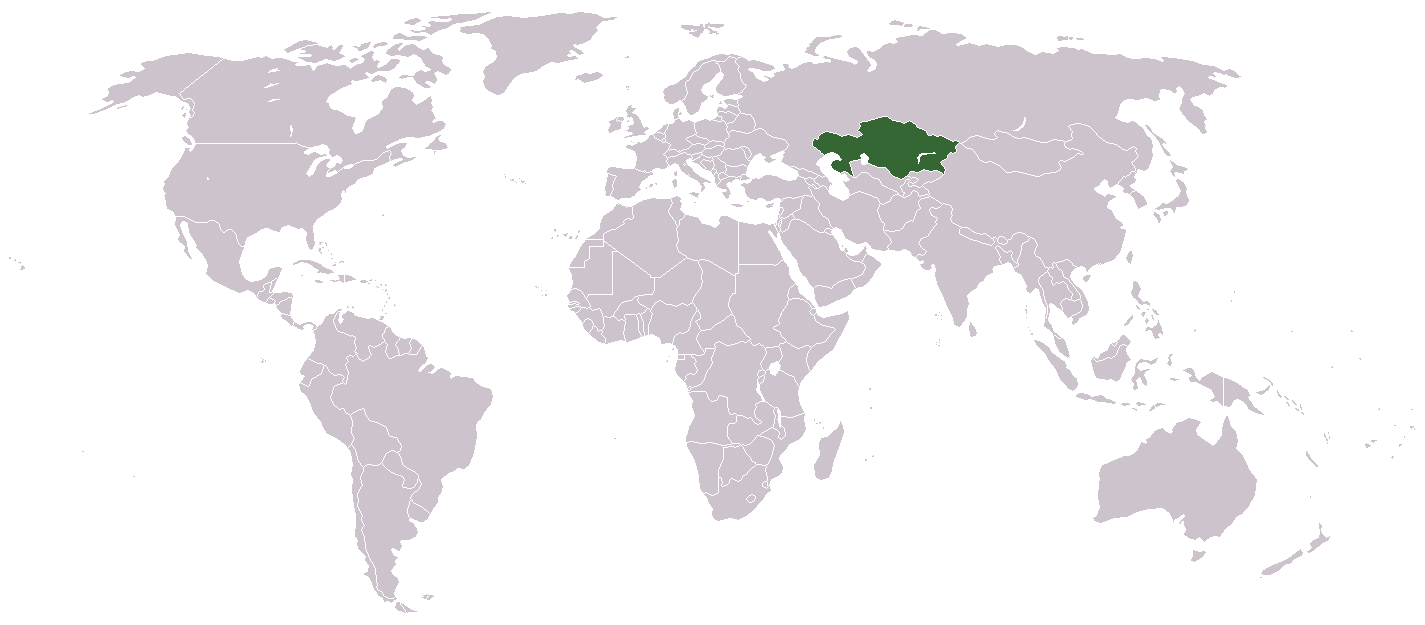
Location of Kazakhstan

This is a list of butterflies of Kazakhstan. Over 370 species of butterfly are known from Kazakhstan.

== Family Papilionidae ==
- Papilio machaon
- Parnassius apollo
- Iphiclides podalirius

== Family Nymphalidae ==
- Chazara enervata
- Vanessa cardui
- Aglais urticae
- Nymphalis xanthomelas
- Melitaea didyma
- Argynnis pandora
- Aglais io
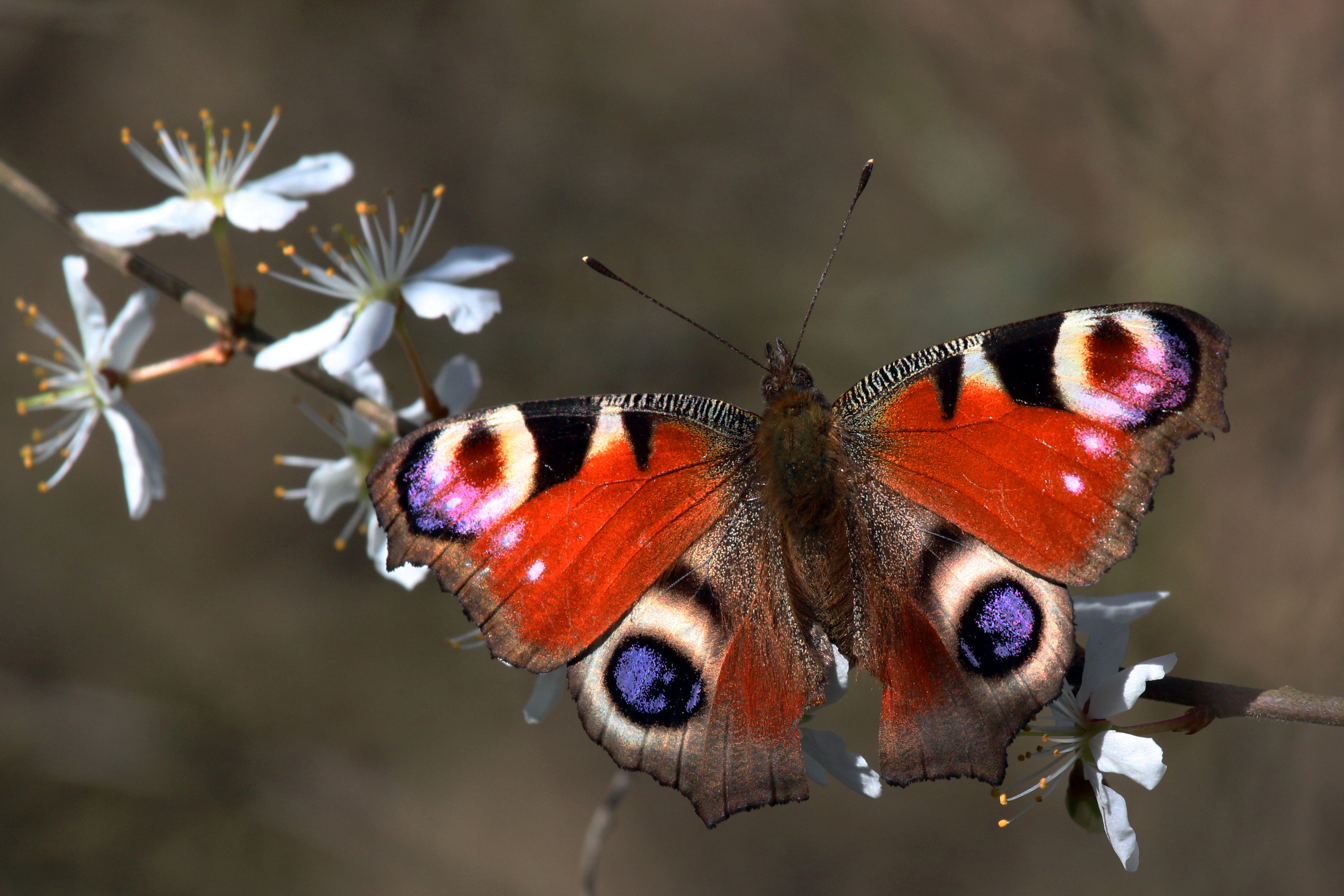
  Aglais io on blackthorn
- Melanargia parce
- Chazara briseis
- Melanargia russiae
- Niobe fritillary
- Argynnis paphia
- Neptis rivularis
- Issoria lathonia
- Hyponephele lupina
- Kirinia eversmanni
- Boloria sipora
- Coenonympha pamphilus
- Hyponephele dysdora
- Vanessa atalanta
- Chazara kaufmanni
- Melitaea phoebe

== Family Pieridae ==
- Pontia edusa
- Aporia crataegi
- Pieris brassicae
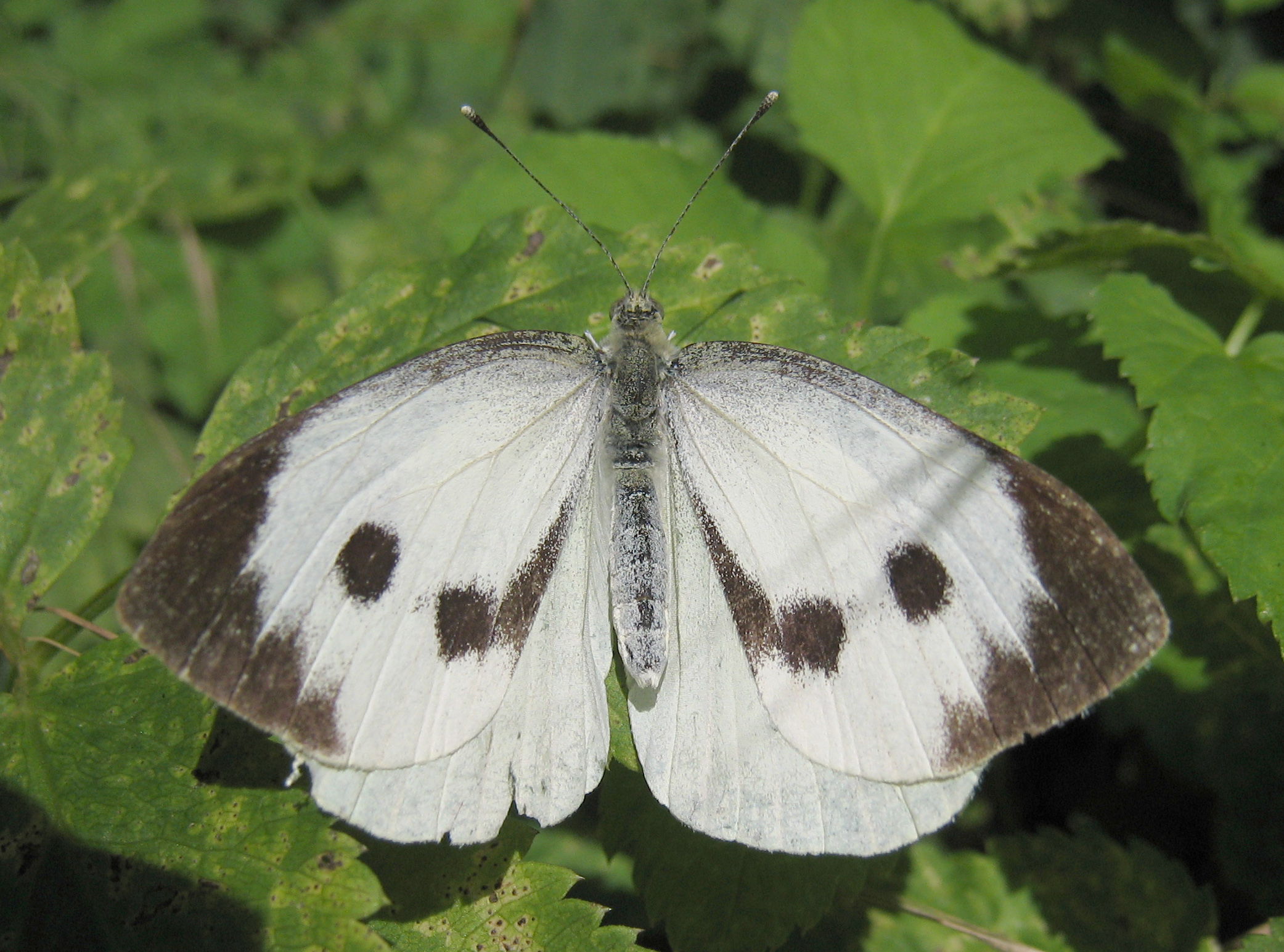
  Female Pieris brassicae
- Gonepteryx rhamni
- Pieris rapae
- Colias erate

== Family Lycaenidae ==
- Polyommatus icarus
- Lycaena thersamon
- Glaucopsyche alexis
