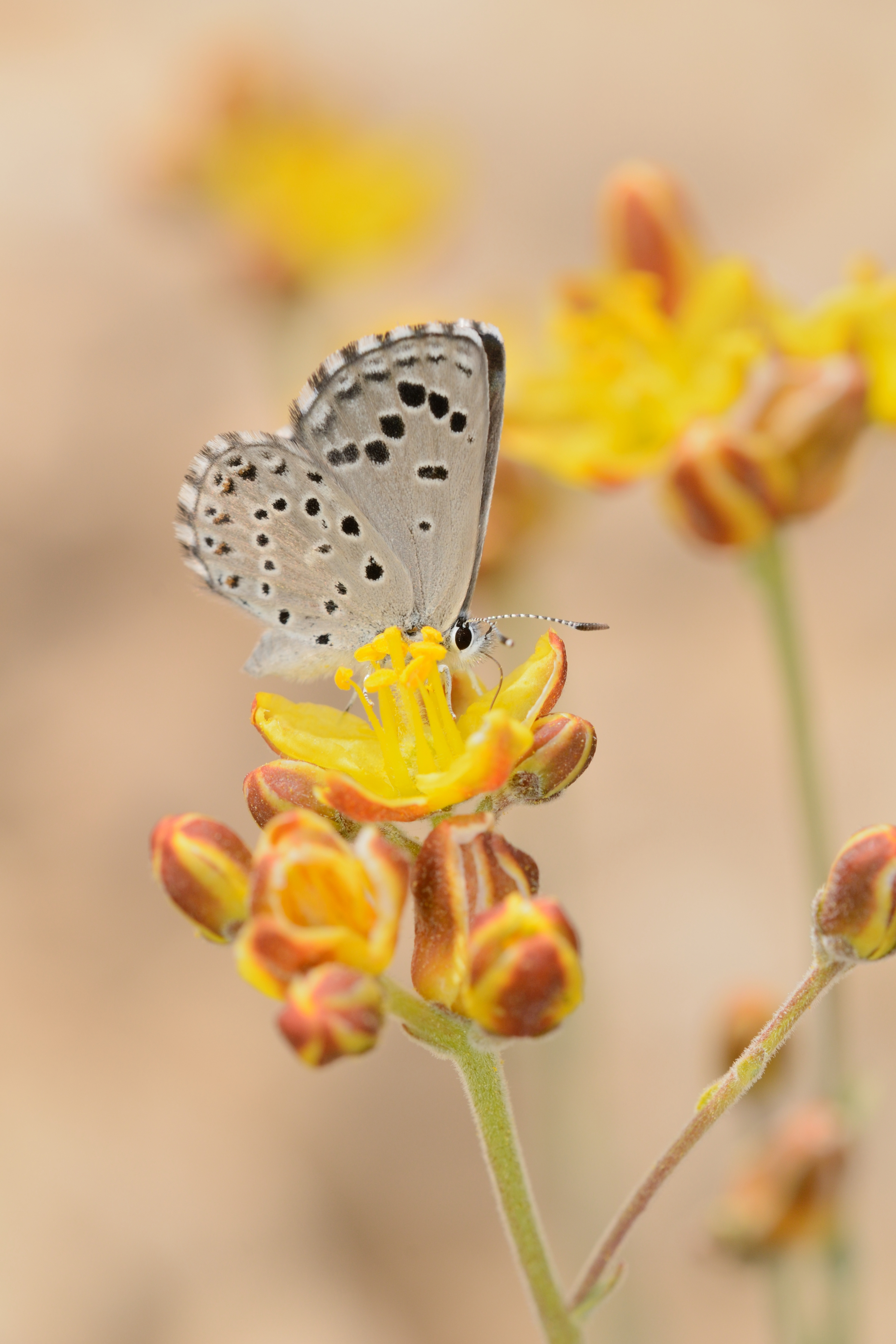

Scientific classification
- Domain: Eukaryota
- Kingdom: Animalia
- Phylum: Arthropoda
- Class: Insecta
- Order: Lepidoptera
- Family: Lycaenidae
- Genus: Pseudophilotes
- Species: P. abencerragus

Binomial name
- Pseudophilotes abencerragus (Pierret, 1837)

Synonyms
- Argus abencerragus Pierret, 1837; Lycaena baton abencerragus f. famelica Seitz, 1907; Turania baton nabataeus Graves, 1925

= Pseudophilotes abencerragus =

Species of butterfly

Pseudophilotes abencerragus, the false baton blue, is a butterfly in the family Lycaenidae. It is found on the Iberian Peninsula and in North Africa, Egypt, Israel, Jordan and Saudi Arabia.

The wingspan is 18–22 mm. It is very like Pseudophilotes baton but the reddish yellow submarginal band is absent from the hindwing beneath, the underside of the hindwing purer in tint, more pale dust-grey, with the ocelli distinct but very thin; the upperside very uniform in colour. Adults are on wing from April to May.

The larvae feed on Cleonia lusitanica, Thymus vulgaris, Medicago cf. turbinata, Medicago hispidus, Thymus cf. hirtus, Salvia taraxacifolia and Thymus fontanesii.The habitat is dry scrub.

== Subspecies ==
- Pseudophilotes abencerragus abencerragus
- Pseudophilotes abencerragus felix Manil, 2006 (Morocco)
- Pseudophilotes abencerragus nabataeus (Graves, 1925) (Saudi Arabia, northern Sinai, the Negev, Jordan)
