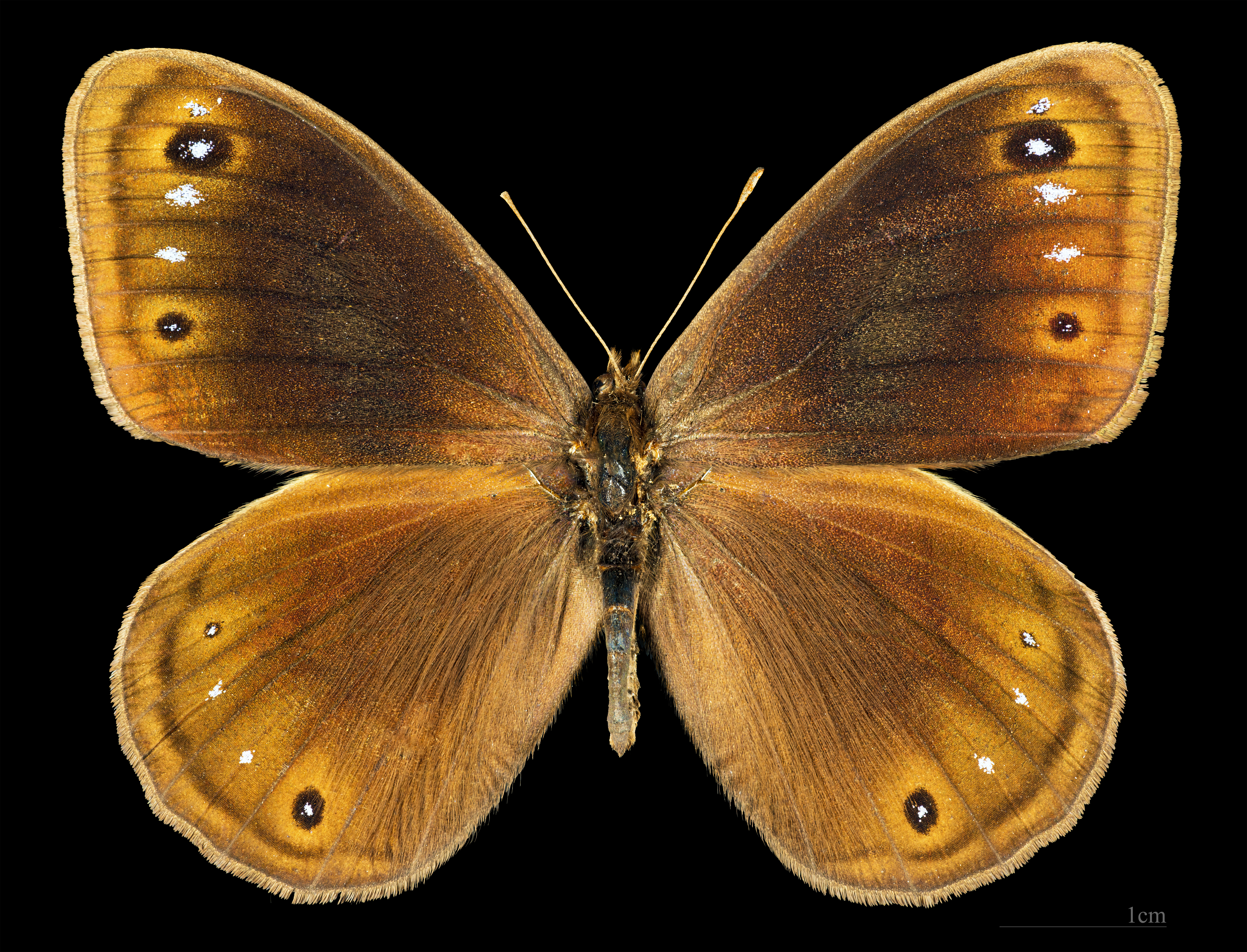
- Male dorsal
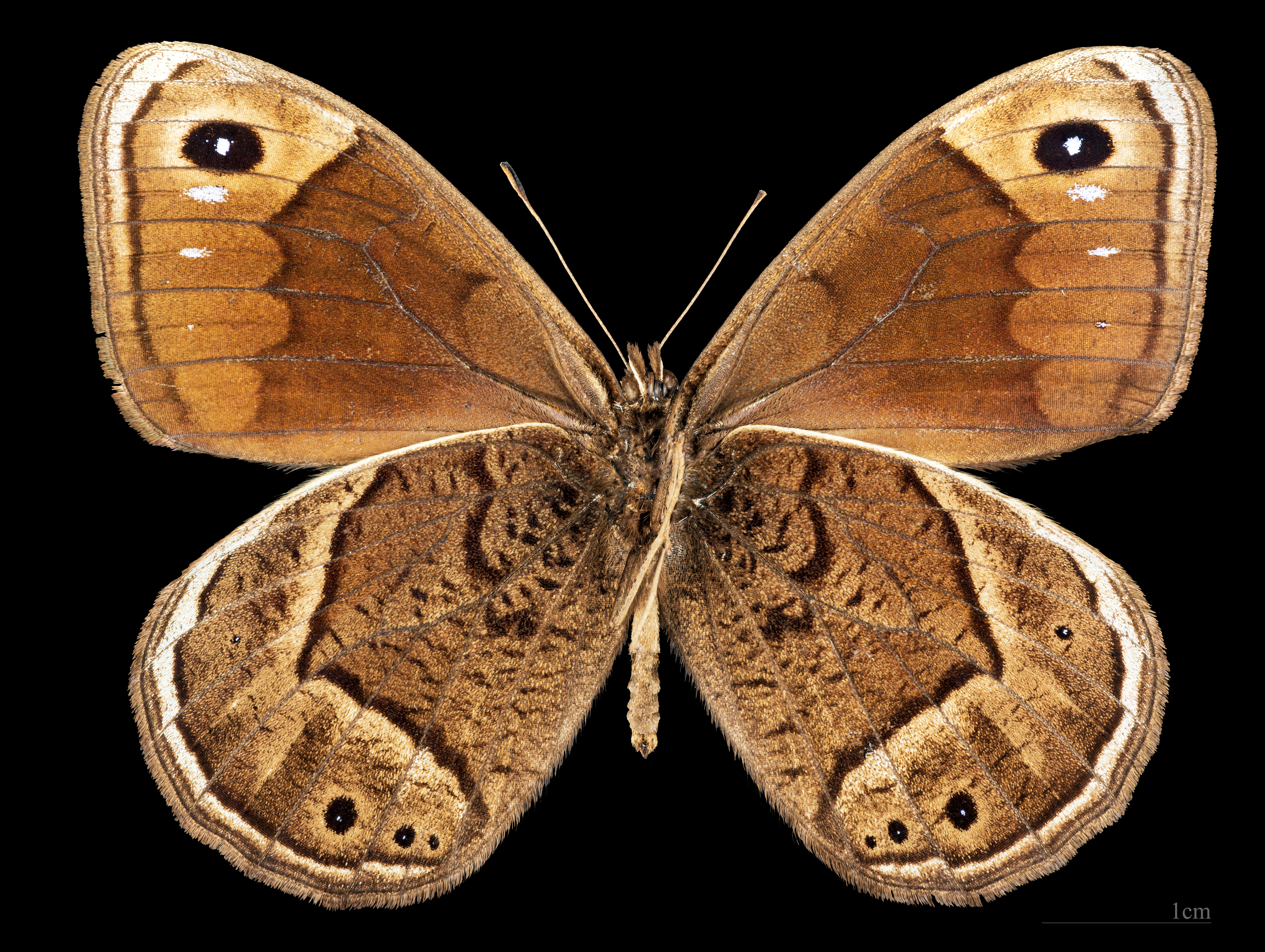
- Male ventral

Scientific classification
- Kingdom: Animalia
- Phylum: Arthropoda
- Class: Insecta
- Order: Lepidoptera
- Family: Nymphalidae
- Genus: Berberia
- Species: B. lambessanus

Binomial name
- Berberia lambessanus (Staudinger, 1901)

Synonyms
- Satyrus abdelkader var. lambessanus Staudinger, 1901; Satyrus (Cercyonis) abdelkader romeii Rothschild, 1933; Satyrus abdelkader alexander Chnéour, 1937

= Berberia lambessanus =

Species of butterfly

Berberia lambessanus is a species of butterfly in the family Nymphalidae. It is endemic to the North African region, mainly Morocco, Algeria, and Tunisia. It flies in the vast steppes but has a preference for slopes, and the males are easily seen flying in search of a shy female. Usually, females are fertilised as soon as they hatch. The range of Berberia lambessanus overlaps with that of B. abdelkader

== Flight period ==
June to October, depending on altitude and locality.

== Food plants ==
Larvae feed on Ampelodesmos mauretanica.
