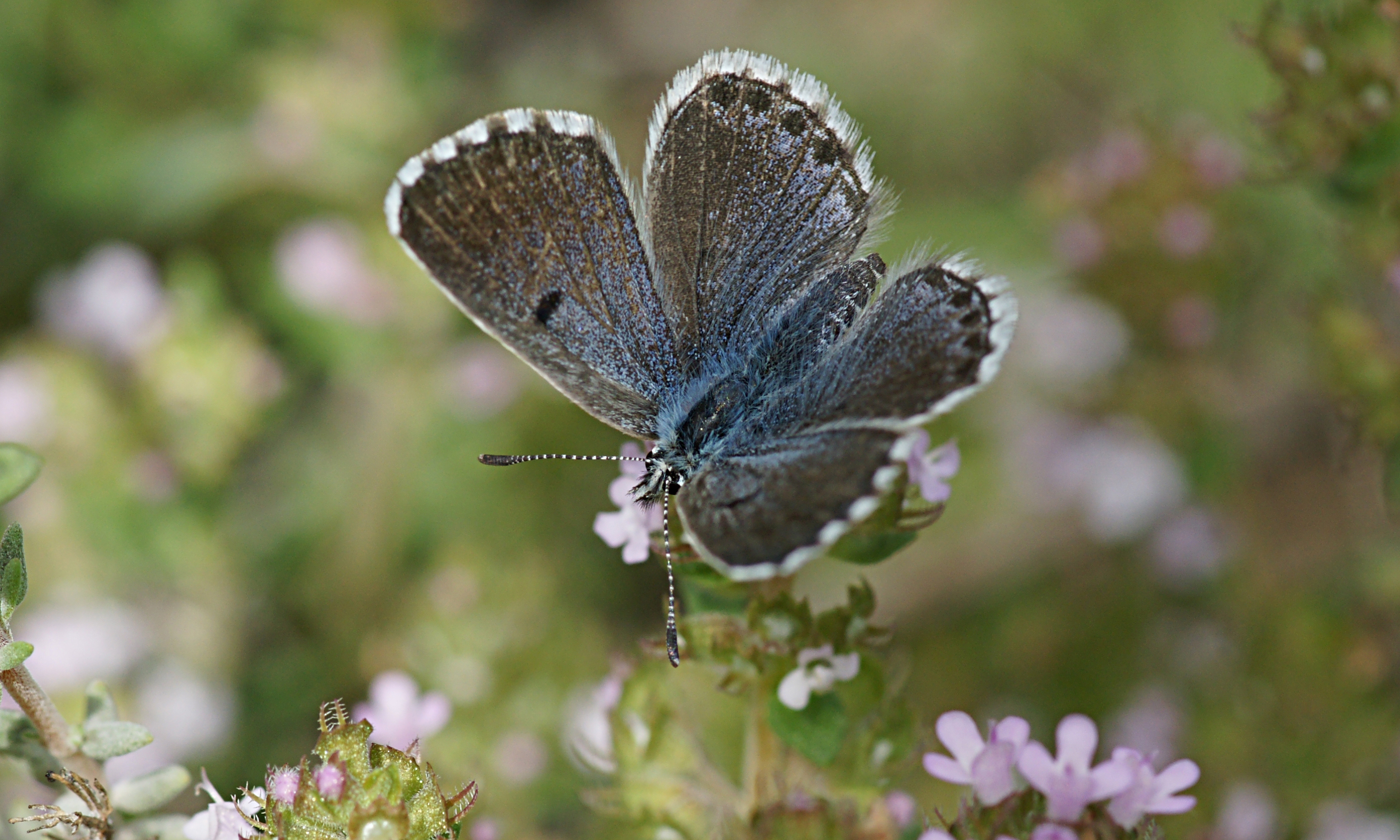
- Pseudophilotes baton female

Conservation status
- Least Concern (IUCN 3.1)

Scientific classification
- Kingdom: Animalia
- Phylum: Arthropoda
- Class: Insecta
- Order: Lepidoptera
- Family: Lycaenidae
- Genus: Pseudophilotes
- Species: P. baton

Binomial name
- Pseudophilotes baton (Bergsträsser, 1779)

Synonyms
- Papilio baton Bergsträsser, [1779]; Philotes baton; Scolitantides baton; Pseudophilotes jacuticus Korshunov & Viidalepp, 1980

= Pseudophilotes baton =

Species of butterfly

Pseudophilotes baton, the baton blue, is a butterfly belonging to the Lycaenidae family. It is found in central and southern Europe and then east across the Palearctic to the Russian Far East.

The wingspan is 10–11 mm. The butterfly flies from April to September.

== Description in Seitz ==
L. baton Bgstr. (= amphion Esp., hylas Schiff.) (79 d). Upperside blackish, the male more or less dusted with blue, the forewing with a distinct discocellular spot, the fringes spotted. Beneath numerous ocelli on a leaden grey ground, larger on the forewing, the latter usually even with ocelli near the base, The hindwing with red-yellow spots before the margin in typical specimens. Throughout Central and South Europe, with the exception of England, occurring from Pommerania and the Baltic Provinces to the Mediterranean, and from Belgium to Central Asia (Altai). — A form very similar to true baton beneath without the reddish yellow anal spots occurs singly everywhere among ordinary baton, being especially plentiful in the south of Europe; this is ab. panoptes Hbn. (= argus minutus Esp.) (79 e). [ now Pseudophilotes panoptes (Hübner, [1813]) — a similar form is found in Spain and North Africa, the reddish yellow submarginal band being absent from the hindwing beneath, the underside of the hindwing purer in tint, more pale dust-grey, with the ocelli distinct but very thin; the upperside very uniform in colour: abencerragus Pier. (79 d). [Now Pseudophilotes abencerragus (Pierret, 1837) — On the southern slopes of the Atlas, on very arid, almost desert-like slopes, I caught in the spring frequently a very small dwarf-form which is hardly half the size of the common abencerragus of North Algeria, and which I call famelica form. nov. (79 e). — In Anterior Asia the males have a brighter colour, which has often a silvery white sheen; this is clara Christ.[now subspecies of Pseudophilotes vicrama] — vicrama Moore [now full species Pseudophilotes vicrama (Moore, 1865) ], from Afghanistan, has no distinct discocellular spot on the upperside of the forewing, there being also no dark marginal dots on the hindwing above. — cashmirensis Moore [now subspecies of Pseudophilotes vicrama], from Kashmir, has a distinct black discocellular spot on the forewing like the European forms on the upperside, moreover, the forewing bears whitish marginal lunules and dark veins and the hindwing marginal dots. — Larva laterally strongly carinate, the segments somewhat swollen, light green with blackish head and rosy-red pyriform dorsal spots divided by a purple dorsal line and accompanied laterally by white dots; stigmata white. In April and again in July, on Thymus, particularly at the flowers; in captivity it often attacks other caterpillars. Pupa roundish, obtuse, smooth, clay-yellow, with darker wing-cases; on the ground. The butterflies are on the wing in May and again in August and September, frequenting very sunny grassy hills and slopes, clearings in woods and broad sunny roads. They fly usually very short distances and settle on grasses and the tops of herbage with the wings half open and widely separated. The flight is slow, somewhat hopping, and the butterflies are not shy. While they occur more singly in Central Europe, they are extremely frequent in South Europe and North Africa, where they often fly in great abundance. In the extreme east of the area of distribution, in Kashmir, they are local, but very common (Butler).

The larvae feed on thyme, Clinopodium acinos, lavender and Mentha.

== Subspecies ==
- Pseudophilotes baton baton (southern and central Europe to south-western Siberia, Altai Mountains)
- Pseudophilotes baton jacuticus Korshunov & Viidalepp, 1980 (Yakutia)

== Etymology ==
Named in the Classical tradition.The specific epithet is derived from Baton, the charioteer of the general Amphiaraos from Greek mythology.
