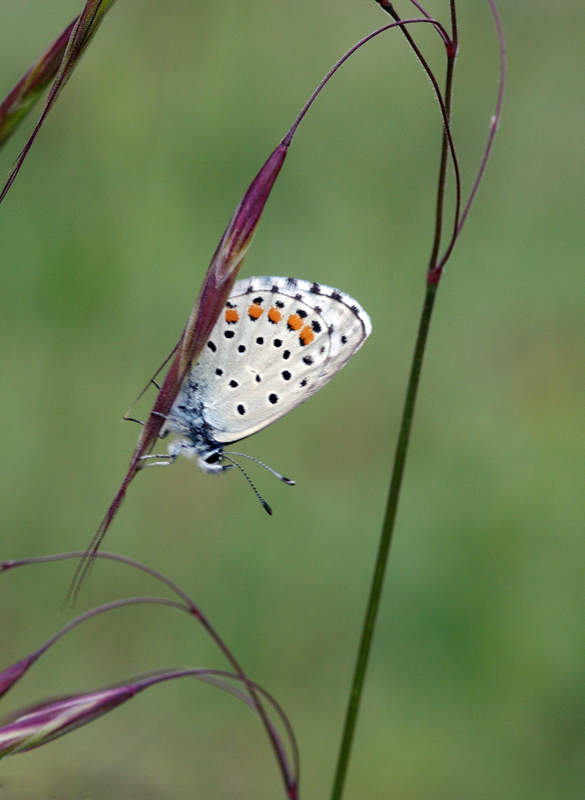
- Pseudophilotes vicrama

Scientific classification
- Domain: Eukaryota
- Kingdom: Animalia
- Phylum: Arthropoda
- Class: Insecta
- Order: Lepidoptera
- Family: Lycaenidae
- Subfamily: Polyommatinae
- Tribe: Polyommatini
- Genus: Pseudophilotes; Beuret, 1958

Synonyms
- Rubrapterus Korshunov, 1990

= Pseudophilotes =

Butterfly genus in family Lycaenidae

Pseudophilotes is a Palearctic genus of butterflies in the family Lycaenidae.

== Species ==
- Pseudophilotes abencerragus (Pierret, 1837)
- Pseudophilotes barbagiae De Prins & Poorten, 1982 Sardinia
- Pseudophilotes baton (Bergstrasser, [1779])
- Pseudophilotes bavius (Eversmann, 1832)
- Pseudophilotes jordanicus (Benyamini, 2000) Jordan
- Pseudophilotes panope (Eversmann, 1851) Kazakhstan
- Pseudophilotes panoptes (Hübner, [1813])
- Pseudophilotes sinaicus Nakamura, 1975
- Pseudophilotes vicrama (Moore, 1865)
