= Chazara rangontavica =

Scientific classification
- Kingdom: Animalia
- Phylum: Arthropoda
- Clade: Pancrustacea
- Class: Insecta
- Order: Lepidoptera
- Family: Nymphalidae
- Genus: Chazara
- Species: C. rangontavica

Binomial name
- Chazara rangontavica J. J. Shchetkin, 1981

Species of butterfly

Chazara rangontavica is a butterfly species belonging to the family Nymphalidae. It is confined to the mountains surrounding the South-Tajik Depression, namely the Tabakchi and Rangontau mountains.

The wingspan is 45–60 mm. The period from May to June is when these butterflies fly.
