= Berberia =

- Berberia lambessanus

Scientific classification
- Domain: Eukaryota
- Kingdom: Animalia
- Phylum: Arthropoda
- Class: Insecta
- Order: Lepidoptera
- Family: Nymphalidae
- Tribe: Satyrini
- Subtribe: Satyrina
- Genus: Berberia de Lesse, 1951

Species
- See text

Genus of butterflies

Berberia is a butterfly genus from the subfamily Satyrinae in the family Nymphalidae. The species in the genus Berberia occur in North Africa.

== Species ==
- Berberia abdelkader (Pierret, 1837)
- Berberia lambessanus (Staudinger, 1901)
