= Chazara staudingeri =

Scientific classification
- Kingdom: Animalia
- Phylum: Arthropoda
- Clade: Pancrustacea
- Class: Insecta
- Order: Lepidoptera
- Family: Nymphalidae
- Genus: Chazara
- Species: C. staudingeri

Binomial name
- Chazara staudingeri (A. Bang-Haas, 1882)

Synonyms
- Satyrus staudingeri Bang-Haas, 1882; Satyrus staudingeri var. gultschensis Grum-Grshimailo, 1888

Species of butterfly

Chazara staudingeri is a butterfly species belonging to the family Nymphalidae. It can be found from the Pamirs-Altai to Inner Tian-Shan.

The wingspan is 45–60 mm. The butterflies fly from July to August.

== Subspecies ==
- Chazara staudingeri staudingeri
- Chazara staudingeri tadjika (Grum-Grshimailo, 1890) (Darvaz, Alai, western Pamirs)
- Chazara staudingeri gultschensis Grum-Grshimailo, 1888 (eastern Alai, Inner Tian-Shan)
