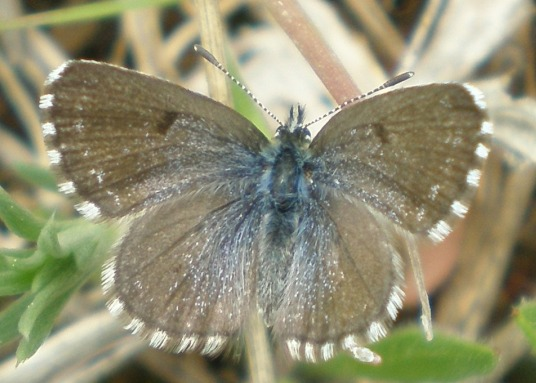

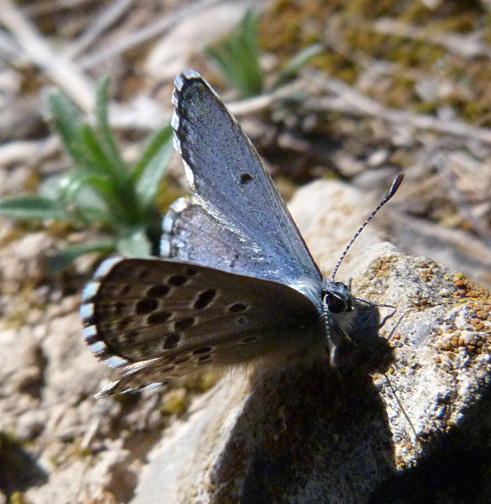

Conservation status
- Least Concern (IUCN 3.1)

Scientific classification
- Kingdom: Animalia
- Phylum: Arthropoda
- Class: Insecta
- Order: Lepidoptera
- Family: Lycaenidae
- Genus: Pseudophilotes
- Species: P. panoptes

Binomial name
- Pseudophilotes panoptes (Hübner, 1813)
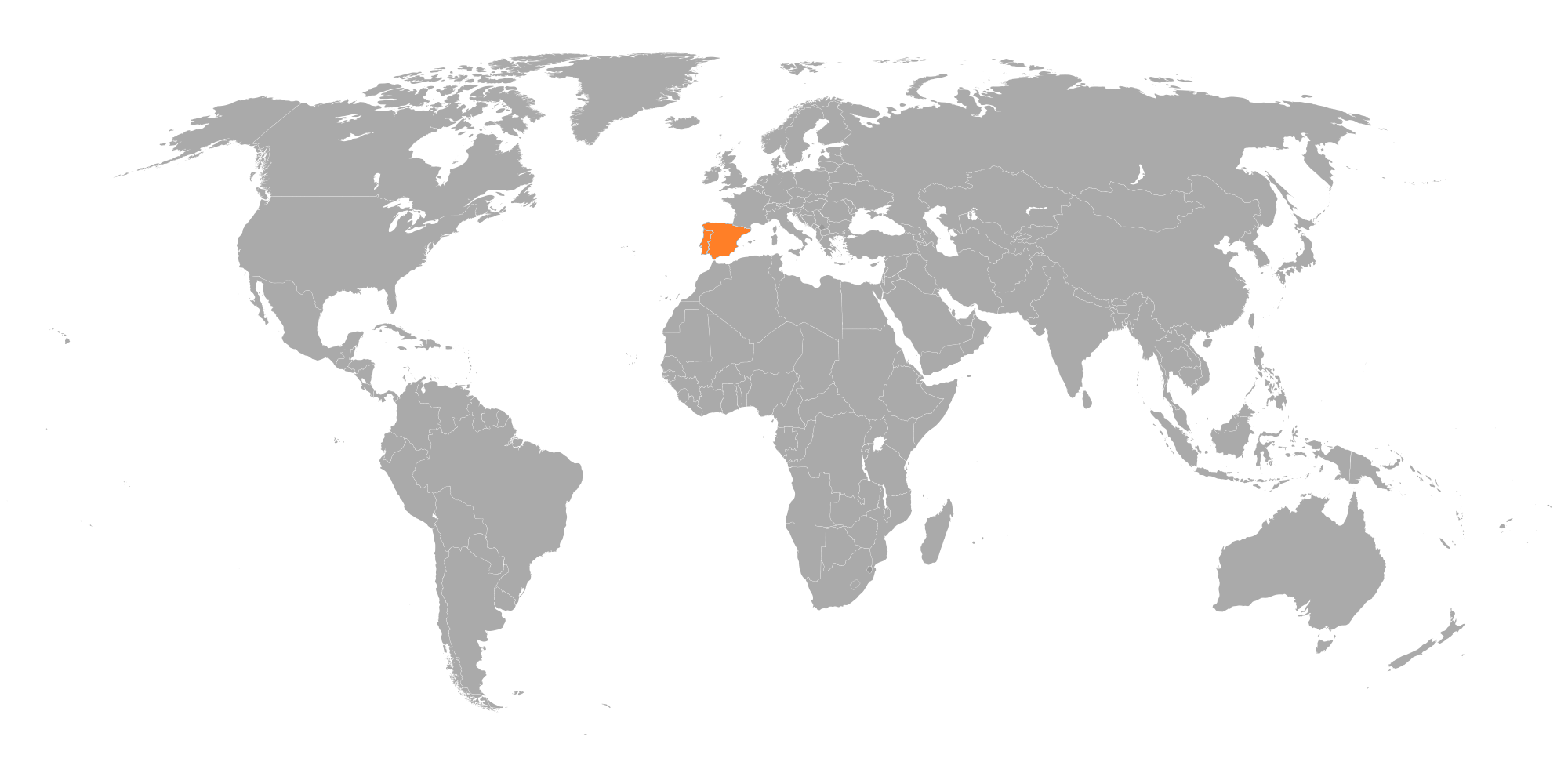

Synonyms
- Papilio panoptes Hübner, [1813]; Scolitantides panoptes

= Pseudophilotes panoptes =

Species of butterfly

Pseudophilotes panoptes, the Panoptes blue, is a butterfly of the family Lycaenidae. It is found on the Iberian Peninsula and in North Africa, including Morocco.

It is very like Pseudophilotes baton but without the reddish yellow anal spots. The wingspan is 18–22 mm. There are two generations per year with adults on wing from March to August.

The larvae feed on Thymus species.

== Etymology ==
Named in the Classical tradition. Argus Panoptes is a many-eyed giant in Greek mythology.
