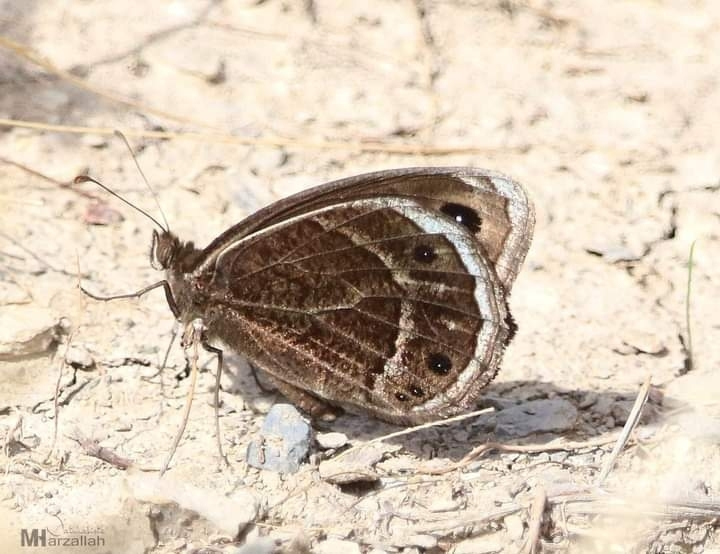

Scientific classification
- Kingdom: Animalia
- Phylum: Arthropoda
- Class: Insecta
- Order: Lepidoptera
- Family: Nymphalidae
- Genus: Berberia
- Species: B. abdelkader

Binomial name
- Berberia abdelkader (Pierret, 1837)

Synonyms
- Satyrus Abd-el-Kader Pierret, 1837; Satyrus abdelkader (Pierret, 1837)

= Berberia abdelkader =

Giant grayling

Species of butterfly

Berberia abdelkader, the giant grayling, is a species of butterfly in the family Nymphalidae. It is endemic to the North African region, mainly Morocco, Algeria, and Tunisia. It flies in the vast steppes and the males are easily seen flying in search of a shy female. Usually, females are fertilised as soon as they hatch.

== Subspecies ==
There are three subspecies of Berberia abdelkader:

- B. a. abdelkader - (Col du Jerada and Oujda in eastern Morocco, Algeria, western Libya
- B. a. nelvai (Seitz, 1911) (Aurès Mountains of Algeria, Moularès Mines of Tunisia)
- B. a. taghzefti (Wyatt, 1952) - (Taghzeft Pass in Morocco)

== Flight period ==
June to October, depending on altitude and locality.

== Food plants ==
Larvae have been recorded on Stipa tenacissima.
