= Chazara eitschbergeri =

Scientific classification
- Kingdom: Animalia
- Phylum: Arthropoda
- Clade: Pancrustacea
- Class: Insecta
- Order: Lepidoptera
- Family: Nymphalidae
- Genus: Chazara
- Species: C. eitschbergeri

Binomial name
- Chazara eitschbergeri Lukhtanov, 1999

Species of butterfly

Chazara eitschbergeri is a butterfly species belonging to the family Nymphalidae. It can be found from Tienshan, Issyk-Kul region, Terskey-Alatoo, Kadzhi-Sai.

The wingspan is 45–60 mm (1.8–2.4 in). The butterflies fly from June to July.
