= Chazara egina =

Anatolian witch

Scientific classification
- Kingdom: Animalia
- Phylum: Arthropoda
- Clade: Pancrustacea
- Class: Insecta
- Order: Lepidoptera
- Family: Nymphalidae
- Genus: Chazara
- Species: C. egina

Binomial name
- Chazara egina (Staudinger, [1892])

Species of butterfly

Chazara egina, the Anatolian witch, is a butterfly species belonging to the family Nymphalidae. It can be found in Turkey and Iran.

The wingspan is 45–60 mm. The butterflies fly from mid-July to mid-August depending on the location.
