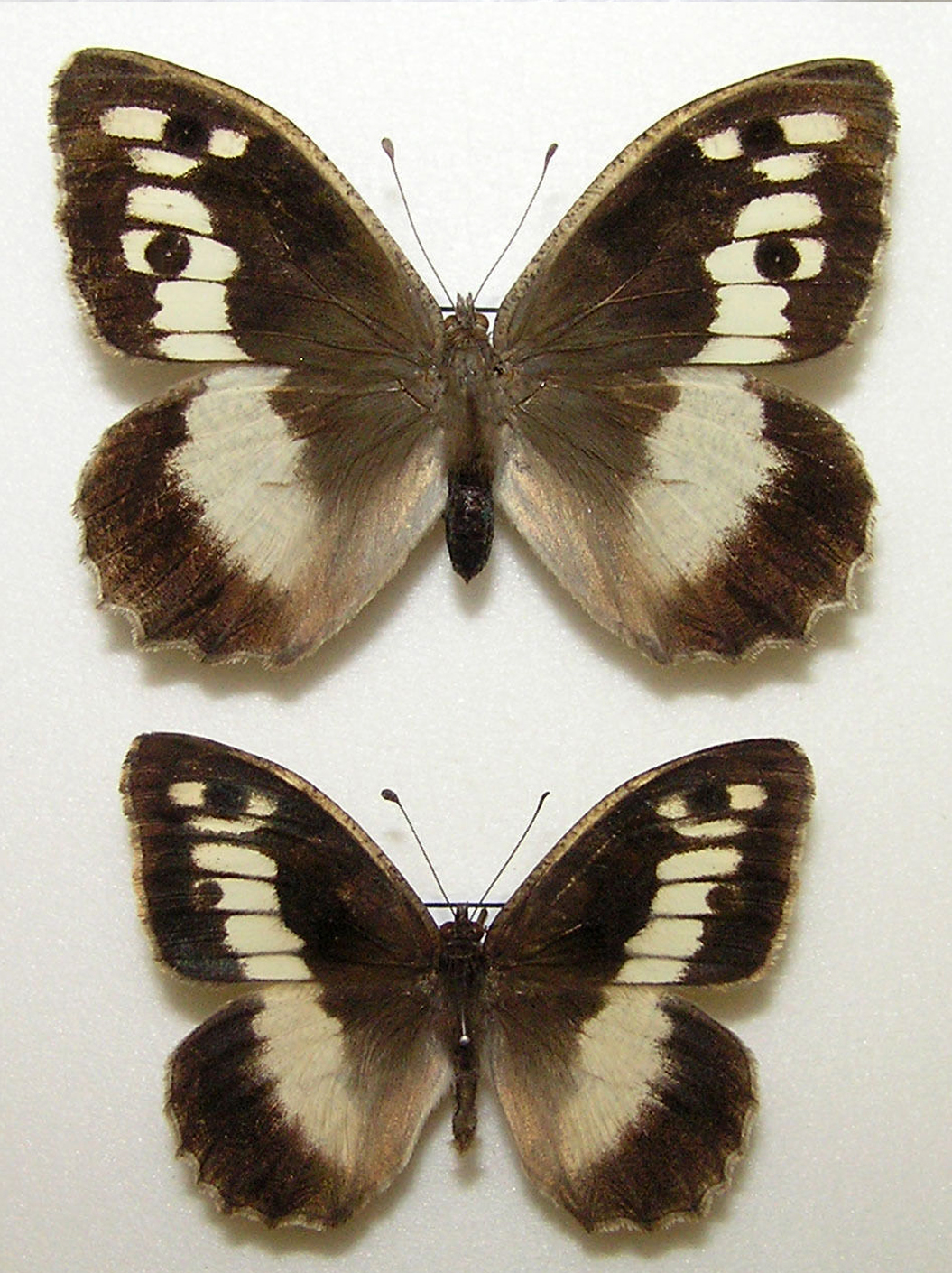
- Chazara briseis female and male

Scientific classification
- Kingdom: Animalia
- Phylum: Arthropoda
- Clade: Pancrustacea
- Class: Insecta
- Order: Lepidoptera
- Family: Nymphalidae
- Subtribe: Satyrina
- Genus: Chazara; Moore, [1893]

Species
- Numerous, see text

Synonyms
- Philareta Moore, 1893

= Chazara =

Genus of butterflies

Chazara is a butterfly genus from the subfamily Satyrinae of the brush-footed butterfly family (Nymphalidae). The most well-known is the hermit butterfly (C. briseis). C. briseis can be found as far west as Morocco and as far eastward as Mongolia. They inhabit the Tian Shan mountain range of Central Asia, also known as the Celestial Mountains, which are fabled in Daoist literature as the place where the Goddess of the West attends to the Peaches of Immortality.

== Selected species ==
- Chazara bischoffii (Herrich-Schäffer, [1846]) – orange hermit
- Chazara briseis (Linnaeus, 1764) – hermit butterfly
- Chazara egina Staudinger, [1892] – Anatolian witch
- Chazara eitschbergeri Lukhtanov, 1999
- Chazara enervata (Alpheraky, 1881)
- Chazara heydenreichi (Lederer, 1853)
- Chazara kaufmanni (Erschoff, 1874)
- Chazara persephone (Hübner, [1805]) – dark rockbrown
- Chazara prieuri (Pierret, 1837) – southern hermit
- Chazara rangontavica Shchetkin, 1981
- Chazara staudingeri (Bang-Haas, 1882)
