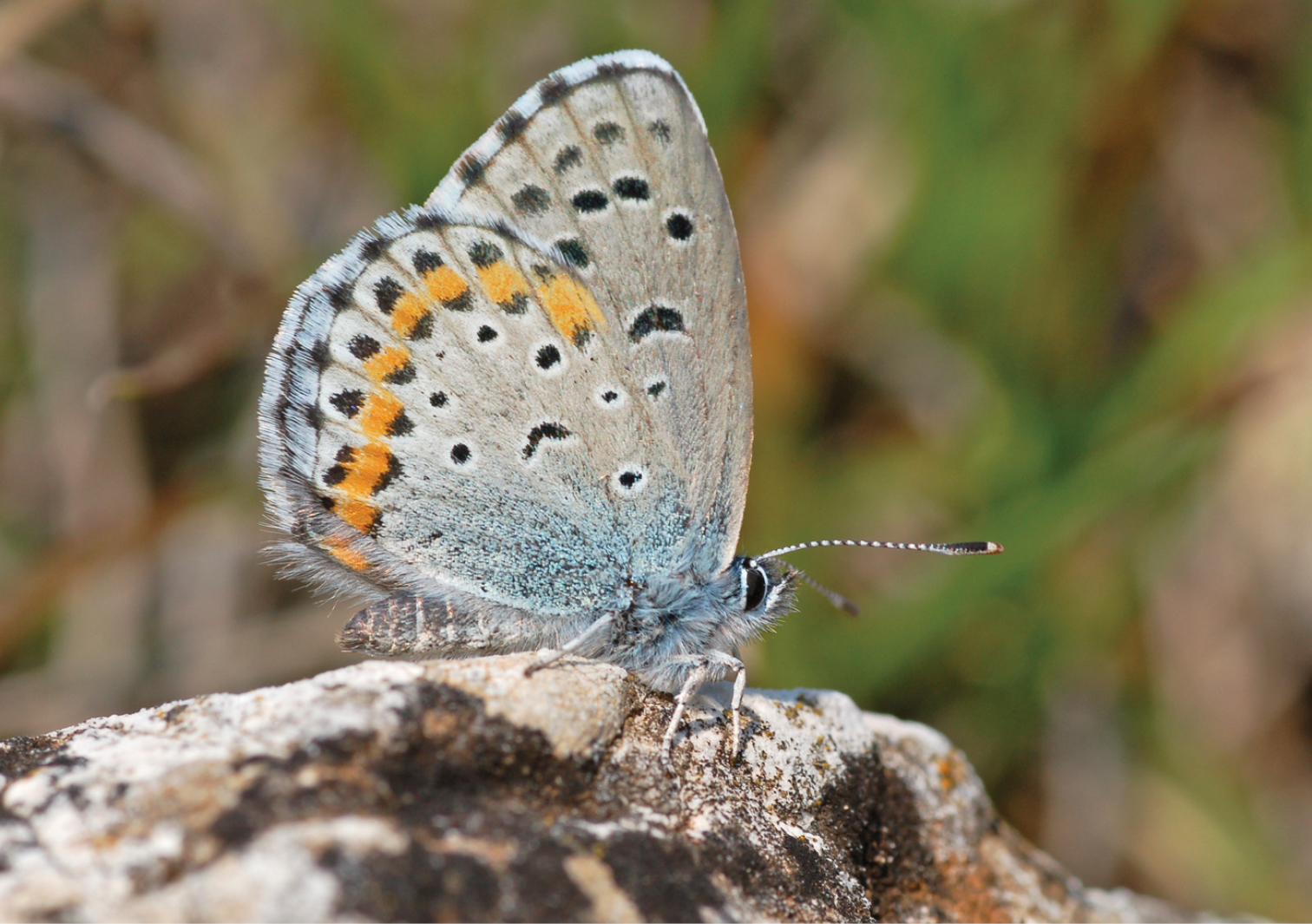

Scientific classification
- Domain: Eukaryota
- Kingdom: Animalia
- Phylum: Arthropoda
- Class: Insecta
- Order: Lepidoptera
- Family: Lycaenidae
- Genus: Pseudophilotes
- Species: P. bavius

Binomial name
- Pseudophilotes bavius (Eversmann, 1832)

Synonyms
- Lycaena bavius Eversmann, 1832; Lycaena bavius var. fatma Oberthür, 1890; Lycaena bavius egea Herrich-Schäffer, [1852]; Lycaena bavius casimiri Hemming, 1932; Lycaena hungaricus (Dioszeghy, 1913)

= Pseudophilotes bavius =

Species of butterfly

Pseudophilotes bavius, the Bavius blue, is a butterfly of the family Lycaenidae. It is found in Morocco, Algeria, Bulgaria, Romania, Greece, Asia Minor, southern Russia and northern Kazakhstan. The species occurs in small isolated populations on flower-rich, dry grassland, on dry, stony slopes and on open patches in shrub and in vineyards on calcareous soil.

The wingspan is 24–30 mm. Adults are on wing from April to May and again from June to July in two generations per year. There is usually one prolonged generation a year with adults on wing from late April to mid-July. In Peloponnesus, a partial second generation may occur.

The larvae feed on Salvia species, including S. officinalis, S. nutans, S. verbenaca and S. verticillata. They feed mostly on the flowers, but sometimes also on the leaves. They are frequently found with ants. Hibernation takes place in the pupal stage.

== Subspecies ==
- Pseudophilotes bavius bavius (steppe of southern Russia, northern Kazakhstan)
- Pseudophilotes bavius casimiri Hemming, 1932 (Peloponnesus)
- Pseudophilotes bavius hungarica (Dioszeghy, 1913) (Transylvania)
- Pseudophilotes bavius fatma (Oberthür, 1890) (Morocco: Middle Atlas, Algeria: Aures Mountains)
- Pseudophilotes bavius egea (Herrich-Schäffer, [1852]) (Caucasus)
- Pseudophilotes bavius macedonicus Schultze, 1958 (Macedonia)
- Pseudophilotes bavius eitschbergeri (Koçak, 1975) (Turkey)
- Pseudophilotes bavius vanicola (Koçak, 1977) (Turkey)

== Etymology ==
Named in the Classical tradition.Bavius was a Roman poet.
