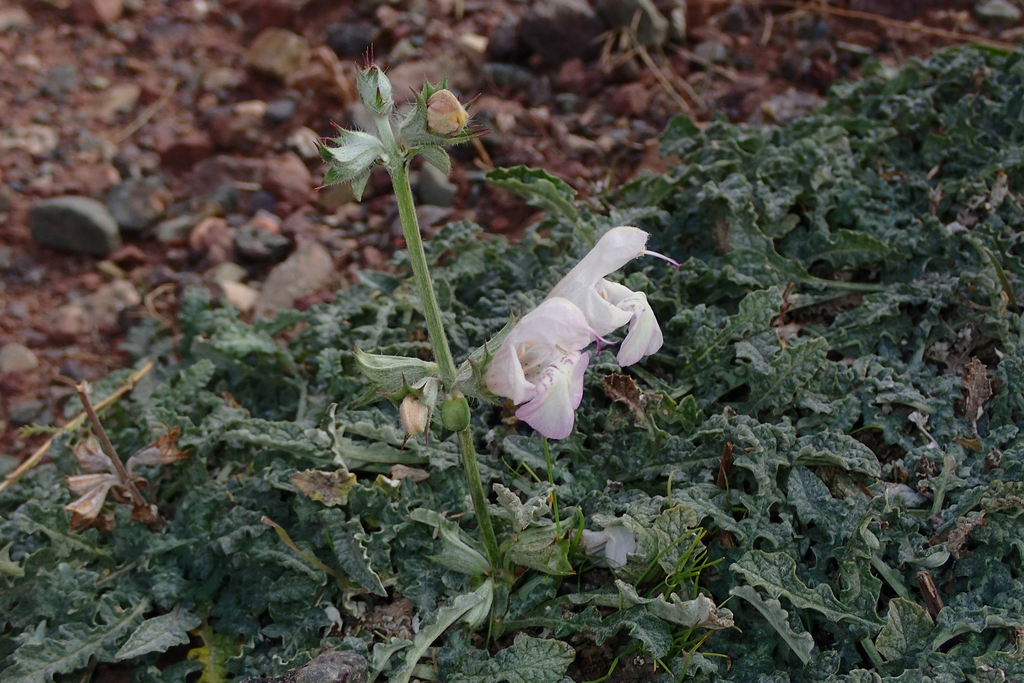

Conservation status
- Endangered (IUCN 3.1)

Scientific classification
- Kingdom: Plantae
- Clade: Tracheophytes
- Clade: Angiosperms
- Clade: Eudicots
- Clade: Asterids
- Order: Lamiales
- Family: Lamiaceae
- Genus: Salvia
- Species: S. taraxacifolia

Binomial name
- Salvia taraxacifolia Coss. & Bal.

= Salvia taraxacifolia =

Species of plant in the mint family

Salvia taraxacifolia is a species of flowering plant in the Lamiaceae family. It is referred to by the common name Dandelion leaved sage and is a herbaceous perennial shrub that is endemic to southwest Morocco, growing in the Atlas Mountains at elevations ranging from 2,000 feet (610 m) to 8,000 feet (2,400 m). Very adaptable, it grows on limestone slopes, forest clearings, and rocky riversides. It has no close allies in the genus Salvia. The specific epithet, taraxacifolia, is likely Persian in origin and means 'leaves shaped like a dandelion'.

Salvia taraxacifolia has lyre-shaped grey-green leaves that remain on the plant year round, with leaves growing up to 4 inches (10 cm) long in thick basal rosettes. The underside is covered with hairs, giving it a whitish color. Glands on the hairs give off a pleasant citrus aroma when brushed. Pinkish-green flowers grow on stalks reaching up to 8 inches (20 cm) tall, growing in whorls spaced about 1 inch (2.5 cm) apart on the inflorescence. Plants spread into large mats, with many flower stalks blooming at once.
