= Chazara heydenreichi =

Scientific classification
- Kingdom: Animalia
- Phylum: Arthropoda
- Clade: Pancrustacea
- Class: Insecta
- Order: Lepidoptera
- Family: Nymphalidae
- Genus: Chazara
- Species: C. heydenreichi

Binomial name
- Chazara heydenreichi (Lederer, 1853)

Synonyms
- Satyrus heydenreichi Lederer, 1853; Chazara kullmanni Wyatt & Omoto, 1966

Species of butterfly

Chazara heydenreichi is a butterfly species belonging to the family Nymphalidae. It can be found from Hindu Kush and the W. Himalaya across Middle Asia and Kazakhstan to the S. Altai.

The wingspan is 45–60 mm. The butterflies fly from June to August.

== Subspecies ==
- Chazara heydenreichi heydenreichi
- Chazara heydenreichi hegesander Fruhstorfer, 1910 (Dzhungarsky Alatau, Tian-Shan)
- Chazara heydenreichi nana Rühl, 1895 (western Pamirs, Ghissar, southern Ghissar, Darvaz, Alai)
