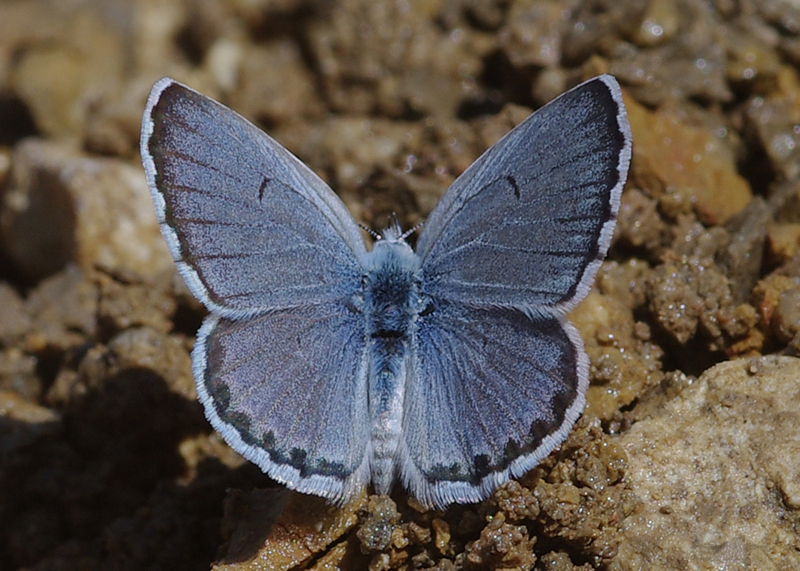
- In Turkey
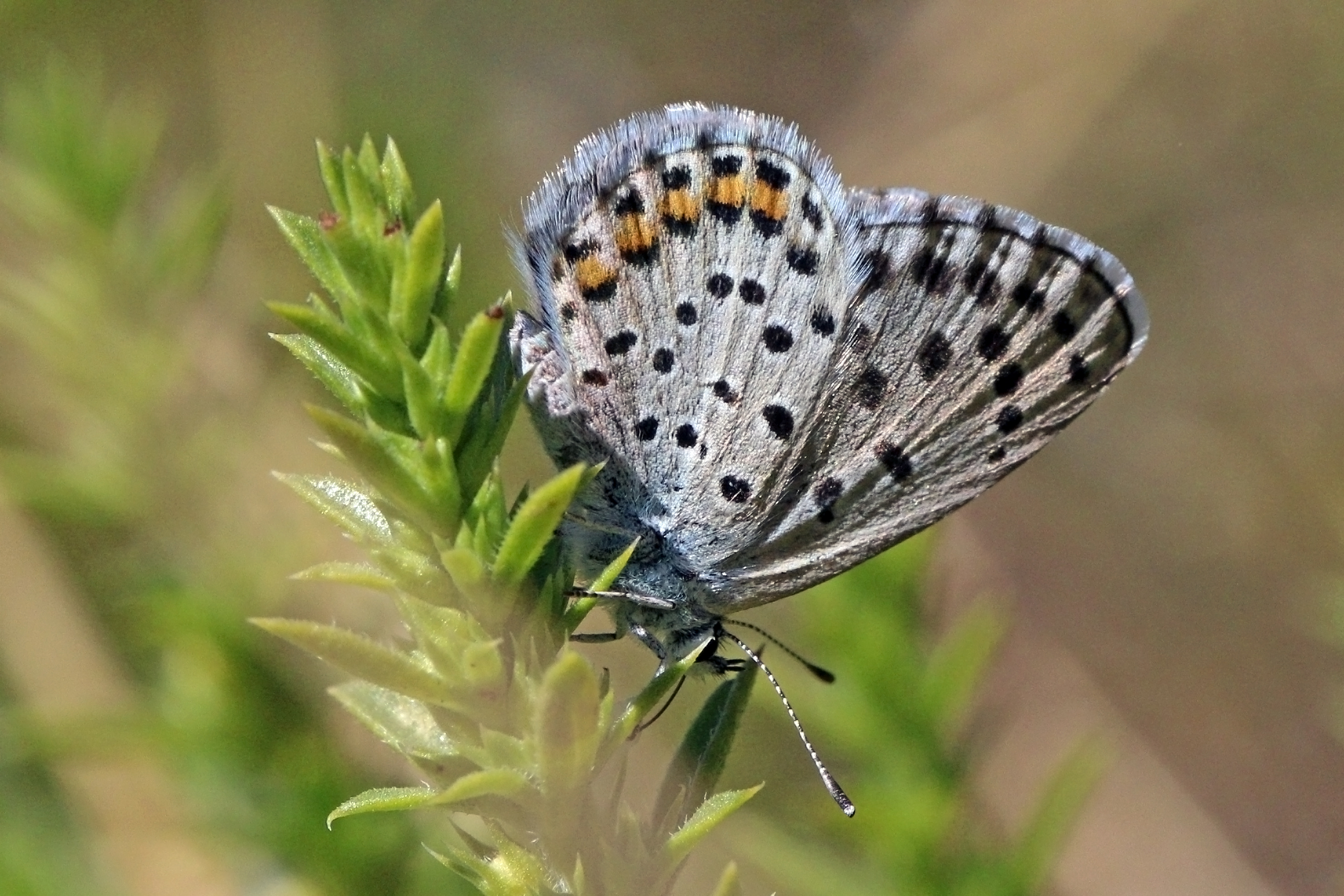
- In North Macedonia

Scientific classification
- Kingdom: Animalia
- Phylum: Arthropoda
- Clade: Pancrustacea
- Class: Insecta
- Order: Lepidoptera
- Family: Lycaenidae
- Genus: Pseudophilotes
- Species: P. vicrama

Binomial name
- Pseudophilotes vicrama (Moore, 1865)

Synonyms
- Polyommatus vicrama Moore, 1865; Scolitantides vicrama (Moore, 1865)

= Pseudophilotes vicrama =

Eastern baton blue

Species of butterfly

Pseudophilotes vicrama, the eastern baton blue, is a small butterfly found in Asia, east to Tian Shan and parts of China, west to the Balkans, Turkey, eastern Europe to southern Finland. It belongs to the lycaenids or blues family. The species was first described by Frederic Moore in 1865.

== Taxonomy ==
This butterfly was earlier known as Polyommatus vicrama (Staudinger).

== Range ==
In Asia, it is found in South Asia from India (Himachal Pradesh) westwards to Balochistan and Chitral in Pakistan.

Mark Alexander Wynter-Blyth records the eastern baton blue as not rare locally and occurring in Baluchistan and from Chitral to Shipki La.

As per Savela, the butterfly is found in the Pamirs - Alay Mountains, Ghissar - Darvaz, Tian-Shan, north-west India south-east Europe, Asia Minor, Caucasus, Transcaucasia, western Siberia, Altai, Turan and Kopet-Dagh.

== Description ==
The eastern baton blue is 20 to 26 mm in size. The male butterfly is pale dusky blue with a broad border, while the female is brown. The butterfly is named for its prominent chequered fringe. In Seitz, it is described as a form of Baton — In Anterior Asia, the males have a brighter colour, which has often a silvery white sheen; this is clara Christ. — vicrama from Afghanistan, has no distinct discocellular spot on the upperside of the forewing, there being also no dark marginal dots on the hindwing above. — cashmirensis Moore, form Kashmir, has a distinct black discocellular spot on the forewing like the European forms on the upperside, moreover, the forewing bears whitish marginal lunules and dark veins and the hindwing marginal dots.

== Subspecies ==
- P. v. astabene (Hemming, 1932) – Turkmenistan (Kopet-Dagh), [Middle East, i.e. Syria, United Arab Emirates, Oman?]
- P. v. cashmirensis (Moore, 1874) – India (Kashmir, etc)
- P. v. pallida (Shchetkin, 1960) – Iran, Tajikistan, Turkmenistan
- P. v. schiffermulleri (Hemming, 1929) – Europe (South-eastern), Asia Minor, Transcaucasia, Russia etc (Western Siberia, Altai)
- P. v. vicrama (Moore, 1865) – Central Asia, China (Tian-Shan), India.

[Note: P. v. astabene (Hemming, 1932) is a replacement name for Lycaena baton clara Staudinger, 1901 [originally as "var. et ab." but later an available subspecies per e.g. Seitz [1909] also directly refers to older Lycaena baton var. clara Staudinger in Christoph, 1887 which was interpreted as Nomen nudum per Bridges, 1994]

== See also ==
- List of butterflies of India (Lycaenidae)
