= Chazara enervata =

Scientific classification
- Kingdom: Animalia
- Phylum: Arthropoda
- Clade: Pancrustacea
- Class: Insecta
- Order: Lepidoptera
- Family: Nymphalidae
- Genus: Chazara
- Species: C. enervata

Binomial name
- Chazara enervata (Alphéraky, 1881)

Synonyms
- Satyrus anthe var. enervata Alphéraky, 1882; Satyrus anthe var. enervata ab. analoga Alphéraky, 1882

Species of butterfly

Chazara enervata is a butterfly species belonging to the family Nymphalidae. It can be found from Kopet-Dagh across Iran and Afghanistan to Pakistan and across the Pamir-Alay to E. Tian-Shan and the S. Altai.

The wingspan is 45–60 mm. The butterflies fly from May to September.
