= Chazara kaufmanni =

Scientific classification
- Kingdom: Animalia
- Phylum: Arthropoda
- Clade: Pancrustacea
- Class: Insecta
- Order: Lepidoptera
- Family: Nymphalidae
- Genus: Chazara
- Species: C. kaufmanni

Binomial name
- Chazara kaufmanni (Erschoff, 1874)

Synonyms
- Satyrus kaufmanni Erschoff, 1874; Satyrus sieversi Christoph, 1885

Species of butterfly

Chazara kaufmanni is a butterfly species belonging to the family Nymphalidae. It can be found from Kopet-Dagh to Dzhungarsky Alatau.

The wingspan is 45–60 mm. The butterflies fly from July to August.

== Subspecies ==
- Chazara kaufmanni kaufmanni
- Chazara kaufmanni sieversi (Christoph, 1885) (Kopet-Dagh)
- Chazara kaufmanni obscurior (Staudinger, 1887) (Tian-Shan, Tarbagatai, southern Altai)
- Chazara kaufmanni sartha (Staudinger, 1886) (Alaisky Mountains)
