= Chazara persephone =

Scientific classification
- Kingdom: Animalia
- Phylum: Arthropoda
- Clade: Pancrustacea
- Class: Insecta
- Order: Lepidoptera
- Family: Nymphalidae
- Genus: Chazara
- Species: C. persephone

Binomial name
- Chazara persephone (Hubner, [1805])

Synonyms
- Eumenis persephone Hübner, [1805]; Papilio anthe Ochsenheimer, 1807; Chazara caucasica Nordmann, 1851; Satyrus hanifa Herrich-Schäffer, [1850]

Species of butterfly

Chazara persephone, the dark rockbrown, is a butterfly species belonging to the family Nymphalidae. It can be found from Crimea across the Caucasus and north of the Middle East to Iran; from the southern Urals across Kazakhstan to the southern Altai and west Siberia.

The wingspan is 45–60 mm. The butterflies fly from June to August.

== Subspecies ==
- Chazara persephone persephone
- Chazara persephone transies Zerny, 1932 (Armenian Highland, Talysh)
- Chazara persephone pseudoenervata Lukhtanov, 1999 (southern Altai)

== Description in Seitz ==
S. anthe O.. (= persephone Hbn.) (42 e). *) In this species the pale spot in the cell of the forewing above is absent, so that the whole costal half of both wings, with the exception of the ivory yellow costal margin of the forewing, appears to be dark brown. The round black spot in front of the centre of the outer margin is so surrounded with white that it resembles the pupil of a large ocellus. Below the cell of the forewing is conspicuously pencilled transversely, and the underside of the hindwing is marbled, and transversed by pale veins. On the shores of the Black Sea, in South Russia, Armenia and Asia Minor, also in Persia and Afghanistan. — In the ab. hanifa Nordm. (42 e) the pale bands are bright ochre-yellow. Such specimens with entirely ochre-brown bands are common among the nymotypical form, especially in the females; among the males mostly transitional specimens are found in which only the centre of the band of the forewing is strongly shaded with brown, the band remaining still rather white costally and posteriorly. — The form enervata Stgr. from Central Asia, the Altai, the Tian-Shan, and Turkestan, is above similar to anthe [ persephone ], but the underside of the hindwing is not traversed by white veins. — The ab. analoga Alph. (= ochracea Ruhl [Stgr. i. l.]) (42 e) has the bands ochre-yellow, the underside of the hindwing being without white veining; occurs among enervata. — anthe [ persephone ] is a widely spread species in Western Asia, and is very abundant, both there and in South Russia in June and July. It settles principally on the trunks of trees; the female however also often on walls and on the ground.
