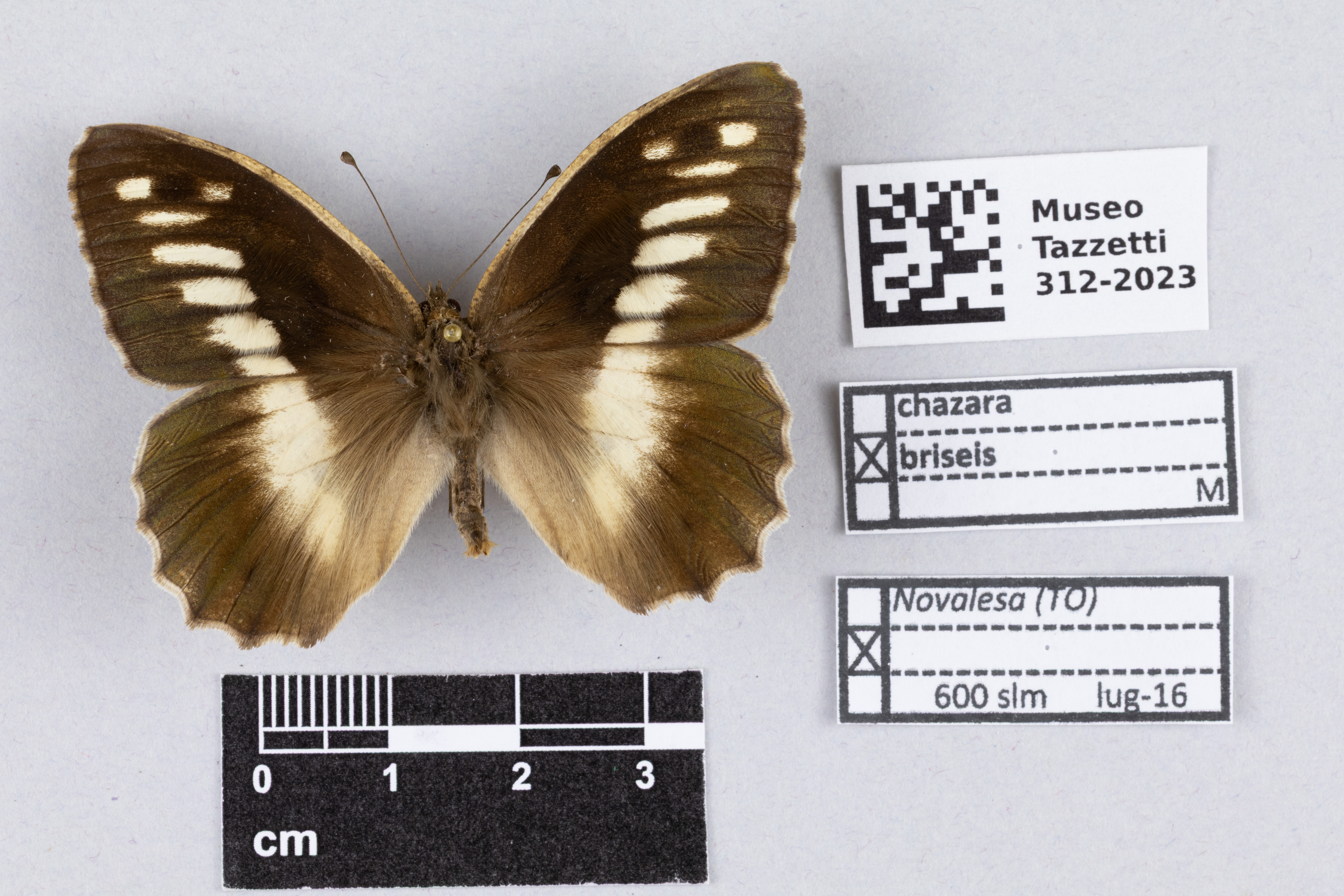

Scientific classification
- Kingdom: Animalia
- Phylum: Arthropoda
- Clade: Pancrustacea
- Class: Insecta
- Order: Lepidoptera
- Family: Nymphalidae
- Genus: Chazara
- Species: C. briseis

Binomial name
- Chazara briseis (Linnaeus, 1764)

Synonyms
- Papilio briseis; Satyrus briseis; Hipparchia briseis

= Chazara briseis =

Species of butterfly

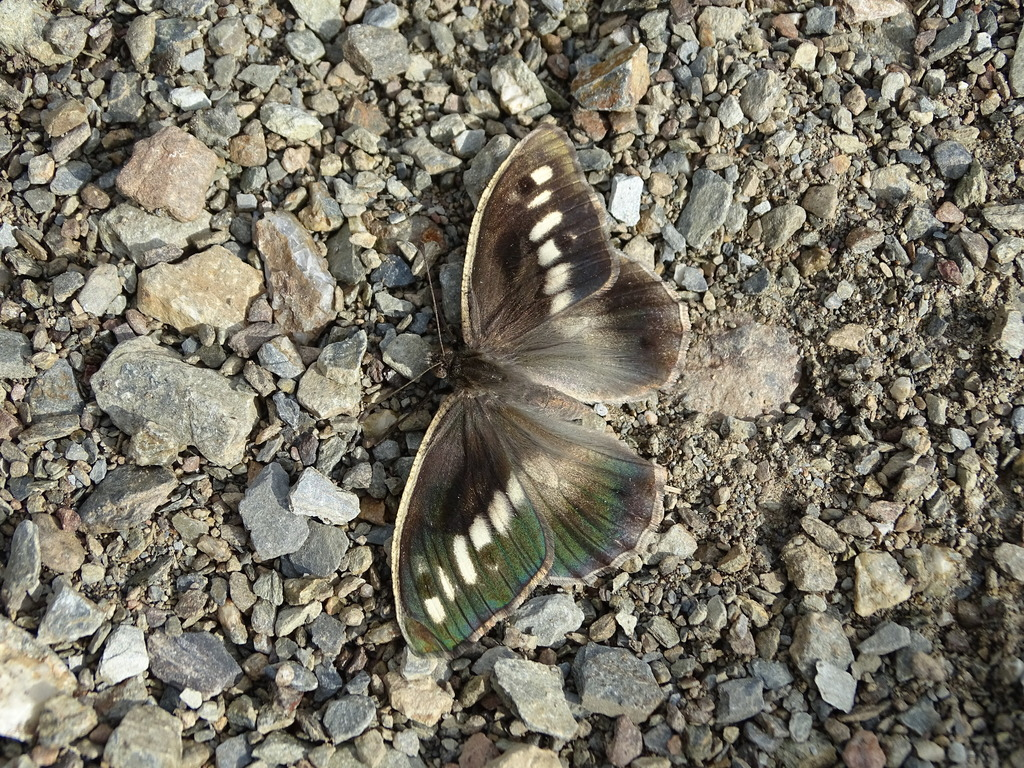
Chazara briseis on the ground

Chazara briseis, the hermit, is a butterfly species belonging to the family Nymphalidae. It can be found in North Africa, southern Europe, Asia Minor, the Caucasus, Kazakhstan, Central Asia through Afghanistan, and north-western China and Tuva. It is found on steppe and in other dry grassy places between 500 and 2,500 meters.

Their wingspan is 45–60 mm. The butterflies fly from July to September depending on the location.

The larvae feed on Sesleria coerulea and Gramineae, Sesleria, Festuca, Stipa, Poa, Brachypodium and Lolium species.

== Subspecies ==
- C. b. briseis includes pirata Esper, 1789
- C. b. major (Oberthür, 1876) Morocco, Algeria, Tunisia
- C. b. meridionalis (Staudinger, 1886) South Europe, West Siberia, Saur, Tarbagatai, Altai, South Siberia
- C. b. hyrcana (Staudinger, 1886) Kopiet-Dagh
- C. b. fergana (Staudinger, 1886) Ghissar, S.Ghissar, Darvaz, Alai includes marandica Staudinger, 1886
- C. b. magna (Rühl, [1894]) North Tian-Shan, Dzhungarsky Alatau
- C. b. lyrnessus (Fruhstorfer, 1908)
- C. b. saga (Fruhstorfer, 1909) Dalmatia
- C. b. armena Jachontov, 1911 Caucasus, Armenian Highland
- C. b. suusamyra Korb, 2005

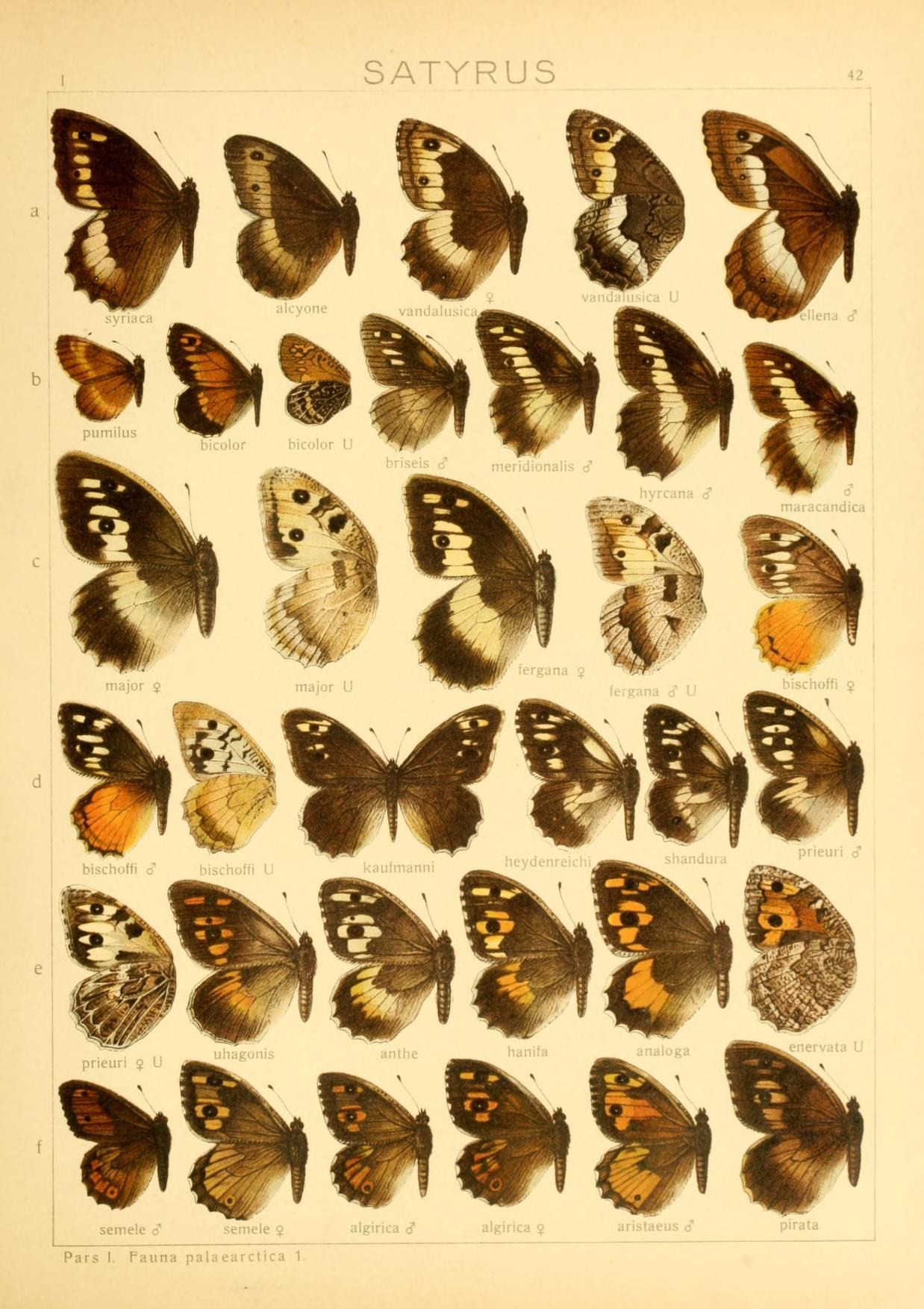
Seitz Plate 42

== Description in Seitz ==
S. briseis L. (= janthe Pall., daedale Bgstr.) (42b). Very variable in size and markings; recognizable by the flat triangular club of the antenna and the pale costal margin of the forewing. The dark wings are traversed by a band which is usually composed of narrow transverse spots, bearing a distinct apical ocellus and a second similar spot before and somewhat below the middle of the distal margin. Band of the hindwing sometimes shaded. On the underside the male has large dark angular spots at the base of both wings, the female having the hindwing beneath generally uniformly brownish or grey; North France, Germany, Austria, Hungary, and the adjacent districts of Russia. — meridionalis Stgr. (42b) is the South-European form, which is especially common on the Mediterranean coasts of Europe. The white spots composing the band of the forewing are broader than in specimens from Central Europe. — magna Stgr. is the from East Europe, which flies also in some districts of Asia Minor; in size like meridionalis, but the band somewhat broader and purer white, especially on the hindwing. — ab. pirata Esp. (42 f) has the size of the previous, but the band is ochreous; occurs among white-banded specimens in South and East Europe, and Anterior Asia, being especially large in the last country. — major Oberth. (42 c) is still considerably larger than meridionalis, the band of the forewing being much narrower, and differs at a glance from all the other forms of briseis in the hindwing beneath, on which in the male the dark triangular spot at the middle of the hindmargin is wanting and the dark longitudinal spot above the middle of the cell is quite light green-grey and not sharply defined. This large form is locally not rare in North Africa, in the Aures Mts. and the Kabylie. — hyrcana Stgr. (42 b) is similar to magna, the white band on the upperside being very narrow and the underside very conspicuously variegated; in Persia and various places of Anterior Asia, especially in the Achal-Tekke country. —fergana Stgr. (42c) is the largest form, which has a rather large white band and in the female a reddish grey underside; from Asia Minor and the Pamir. — turanica Stgr. is nearly as large, the band not being very broad and on the hindwing of the male distinctly tinged with red-brown. — maracandica Stgr. (42 b), from Samarkand, is a medium-sized form which has very much white, the median band of both wings being very broad and in addition the distal margin of the hindwing being broadly white. — Larva yellowish grey, with a dark dorsal stripe and dark subdorsal lines; two light lateral lines above the spiracles, the stigmata themselves being black; venter light grey; till June on grasses. Pupa brownish yellow, with a darker dorsal stripe. The butterflies from July till September; they prefer chalky soil and love to settle on bare places of the ground and on boulders. The flight is low and hopping in the small northern form, stately, floating and rather fast in the large forms from Africa and Asia Minor. The butterfly now and again visits scabious thistles or other composites, keeping the wings tightly closed when resting.
