= Alexandre Pierret =

French entomologist (1814–1850)

Alexandre Pierret (12 April 1814, in Paris – 27 May 1850, in Paris) was a French entomologist who specialised in Lepidoptera. He was a Member of the Société Entomologique de France

== Works ==
- Pierret, A. 1833 Notice sur le Polyommate ceronus. Annales de la Société Entomologique de France, Paris 2 (1) 119-121
- Pierret, A. 1836 Description d'une nouvelle espèce du genre Anthocharis. [A. Douei]. Annales de la Société Entomologique de France, Paris - 5 (2) 367-370, 1 col. plate
- Pierret, A. 1837 Description de trois nouvelles espèces de Lépidoptères. Annales de la Société Entomologique de France, Paris - 6 (1) 19-23, 1 col. plate
- Pierret, A. 1837 Description d'une nouvelle espèce du genre Hadena. [H. Latenai]. Annales de la Société Entomologique de France, Paris - 6 (2) 177
- Pierret, A. 1837 Description de deux nouvelles espèces du genre Satyre Latr. Annales de la Société Entomologique de France, Paris - 6 (3) 303-307, 1 col. plate
- Pierret, A. 1838 Description d'une nouvelle espèce du genre Gortyna. [G. Borelii]. Annales de la Société Entomologique de France, Paris - 6 (1837) (4) 449-451, 1 col. plate
- Pierret, A. 1838 Accouplement du Satyrus janira ♀ avec Argynnis paphia ♂. Annales de la Société Entomologique de France, Bulletin entomologique, Paris - 7 (3) LIV
- Pierret, A. 1839 Description d'une nouvelle espèce du genre Agrotis. [A. Desillei]. Annales de la Société Entomologique de France, Paris - 8 (1/2) 95-97, 1 col. plate
- Pierret, A. 1840 Notice sur les Lépidoptères publies par lui. Annales de la Société Entomologique de France, Bulletin entomologique, Paris - 8 (1839) (4) XLII-XLIII
- with Léon Fairmaire and Achille Deyrolle Guide de jeune amateur de Coléoptères et de Lépidoptères, indiquant Les Utensiles nécessaires à la chasse de ces Insectes, Les lieux et époques les plus favorables à cette chasse, suivi de la manière de les préparer et de les conserver. Paris, Deyrolle 127 p. 1847
