= List of butterflies of Iran =

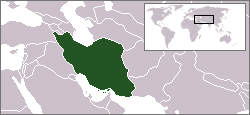
Location of Iran

At least 419 butterfly species from Iran have been identified.

In 2023 the results of a 13-year megaproject about the Lepidoptera of Iran were produced as Lepidoptera Iranica. It was published as a special issue of Integrative Systematics: Stuttgart Contributions to Natural History and provides a comprehensive overview of the Lepidoptera of Iran. It involved an international collaboration between 73 researchers, who reviewed published and unpublished data. The project was led and edited by Hossein Rajaei of the State Museum of Natural History Stuttgart in Germany) and Ole Karsholt of the Natural History Museum of Denmark.

The authors also added hundreds of new records from institutional and private collections. In total, 4,812 butterfly and moth species were documented as part of the project, including the first records of three families and 182 species for Iran. Four species new to science were discovered and several taxonomic changes were proposed. The special issue also provides a historical overview of lepidopterology in Iran, as well as an analysis of Iranian Lepidoptera and an estimate of the number of Lepidoptera species still to be discovered. Finally, a gazetteer of sampling localities is supplied.

The following list provides a subset of known butterfly species which have been recorded in Iran. A complete list of Lepidoptera of Iran is included in the External links below.

== Papilionidae ==
- Allancastria caucasica
- Allancastria cerisyi
- Archon apollinaris
- Archon apollinus
- Hypermnestra helios
- Iphiclides podalirius
- Lamproptera curius
- Pachliopta aristolochiae
- Papilio alexanor
- Papilio maackii
- Papilio machaon
- Papilio saharae
- Parnassius acco
- Parnassius actius
- Parnassius apollo
- Parnassius delphius
- Parnassius hardwickii
- Parnassius jacquemontii
- Parnassius mnemosyne
- Parnassius nordmanni
- Princeps demoleus
- Zerynthia deyrollei
- Zerynthia louristana
- Zerynthia polyxena
- Parnassius maharaja
- Parnassius staudingeri
- Parnassius stoliczkanus
- Hypermnestra helios
- Parnassius boedromius
- Parnassius charltonius
- Parnassius epaphus
- Parnassius inopinatus
- Parnassius loxias
- Parnassius simo
- Parnassius staudingeri
- Parnassius stenosemus
- Papilio ladakensis

== Pieridae ==
- Anthocharis cardamines
- Anthocharis damone
- Anthocharis gruneri
- Aporia agathon
- Aporia crataegi
- Aporia leucodice
- Baltia shawi
- Belenois aurota
- Catopsilia florella
- Catopsilia pomona
- Colias alfacariensis
- Colias alpherakii
- Colias aurorina
- Colias chlorocoma
- Colias chrysotheme
- Colias cocandica
- Colias croceus
- Colias eogene
- Colias erate
- Colias fieldii
- Colias hofmannorum
- Colias hyale
- Colias ladakensis
- Colias leechi
- Colias marcopolo
- Colias sagartia
- Colias stoliczkana
- Colias thisoa
- Colias wiskotti
- Colotis amata
- Colotis antevippe
- Colotis danae
- Colotis etrida
- Colotis eucharis
- Colotis fausta
- Colotis liagore
- Colotis phisadia
- Colotis protractus
- Colotis vestalis
- Euchloe ausonia
- Euchloe belemia
- Euchloe charlonia
- Euchloe daphalis
- Euchloe lessei
- Euchloe penia
- Euchloe transcaspica
- Eurema blanda
- Eurema hecabe
- Eurema laeta
- Gonepteryx cleopatra
- Gonepteryx farinosa
- Gonepteryx mahaguru
- Gonepteryx rhamni
- Leptidea duponcheli
- Leptosia nina
- Pareronia hippia
- Pieris bowdeni
- Pieris brassicae
- Pieris bryoniae
- Pieris canidia
- Pieris deota
- Pieris ergane
- Pieris krueperi
- Pieris pseudorapae
- Pieris rapae
- Pinacopteryx eriphia
- Pontia callidice
- Pontia chloridice
- Pontia daplidice
- Pontia edusa
- Pontia glauconome
- Zegris eupheme

== Nymphalidae ==
=== Libytheinae ===
- Libythea celtis

=== Charaxinae ===
- Charaxes jasius

=== Danainae ===
- Danaus chrysippus
- Tirumala limniace

=== Heliconiinae ===
- Argynnis pandora
- Argynnis paphia
- Boloria euphrosyne
- Boloria jerdoni
- Boloria pales
- Brenthis daphne
- Brenthis hecate
- Brenthis mofidii
- Fabriciana adippe
- Fabriciana niobe
- Issoria lathonia
- Speyeria aglaja
- Speyeria alexandra

=== Apaturinae ===
- Apatura ilia
- Apatura iris
- Euapatura mirza
- Hestina nicevillei
- Mimathyma ambica
- Rohana parisatis
- Sephisa dichroa
- Thaleropis ionia

=== Limenitidinae ===
- Aldania thisbe
- Athyma cama
- Athyma nefte
- Athyma opalina
- Athyma perius
- Euthalia aconthea
- Limenitis reducta
- Limenitis trivena
- Neptis rivularis
- Neptis sappho'

=== Nymphalinae ===
- Aglais io
- Aglais rizana
- Aglais urticae
- Araschnia levana
- Euphydryas aurinia
- Hypolimnas bolina
- Hypolimnas misippus
- Junonia hierta
- Melitaea arcesia
- Melitaea arduinna
- Melitaea casta
- Melitaea cinxia
- Melitaea consulis
- Melitaea deserticola
- Melitaea didyma
- Melitaea interrupta
- Melitaea persea
- Melitaea sarvistana
- Melitaea saxatilis
- Melitaea trivia
- Melitaea turkmanica
- Nymphalis polychloros
- Nymphalis xanthomelas
- Nymphalis vaualbum
- Polygonia c-album
- Polygonia egea
- Vanessa atalanta
- Vanessa cardui

=== Satyrinae ===
- Arethusana arethusa
- Brintesia circe
- Chazara bischoffi
- Chazara briseis
- Chazara egina
- Chazara enervata
- Chazara kaufmanni
- Chazara persephone
- Coenonympha leander
- Coenonympha pamphilus
- Coenonympha saadi
- Erebia graucasica
- Erebia iranica
- Esperarge clymene
- Hipparchia fatua
- Hipparchia parisatis
- Hipparchia pellucida
- Hipparchia turcmenica
- Hipparchia syriaca
- Hyponephele amardaea
- Hyponephele cadusia
- Hyponephele capella
- Hyponephele comara
- Hyponephele davendra
- Hyponephele dysdora
- Hyponephele huebneri
- Hyponephele interposita
- Hyponephele lupina
- Hyponephele lycaonoides
- Hyponephele naricina
- Hyponephele shirazica
- Hyponephele wagneri
- Kirinia roxelana
- Lasiommata adrastoides
- Lasiommata megera
- Lasiommata menava
- Lyela myops
- Maniola jurtina
- Maniola telmessia
- Melanargia evartianae
- Melanargia galathea
- Melanargia hylata
- Melanargia meda
- Melanargia russiae
- Melanargia syriaca
- Melanargia teneates
- Minois dryas
- Proterebia afra
- Pseudochazara anthelea
- Pseudochazara aurantiaca
- Pseudochazara beroe
- Pseudochazara daghestana
- Pseudochazara mamurra
- Pseudochazara pelopea
- Pseudochazara schakuhensis
- Pseudochazara telephassa
- Satyrus amasinus
- Satyrus daubi
- Satyrus favonius
- Satyrus parthicus
- Ypthima bolanica

== Lycaenidae ==
- Acytolepis puspa
- Afarsia morgiana
- Afarsia sieversii
- Agriades aegagrus
- Anthene amarah
- Aricia agestis
- Aricia anteros
- Aricia vandarbani
- Axiocerses harpax
- Azanus jesous
- Azanus ubaldus
- Callophrys mystaphia
- Callophrys suaveola
- Celastrina argiolus
- Chilades parrhasius
- Cigaritis acamas
- Cigaritis epargyros
- Cigaritis maxima
- Cigaritis myrmecophila
- Cupido osiris
- Cupido staudingeri
- Cyaniris semiargus
- Deudorix livia
- Freyeria trochylus
- Glaucopsyche alexis
- Iolana iolas
- Iolaus glaucus
- Kretania alcedo
- Kretania eurypilus
- Kretania pylaon
- Lampides boeticus
- Leptotes pirithous
- Luthrodes contracta
- Luthrodes galba
- Lycaena alciphron
- Lycaena asabinus
- Lycaena candens
- Lycaena dispar
- Lycaena lampon
- Lycaena lamponides
- Lycaena ochimus
- Lycaena phlaeas
- Lycaena phoenicura
- Lycaena thersamon
- Lycaena thetis
- Lycaena tityrus
- Lysandra bellargus
- Lysandra corydonius
- Myrina silenus
- Neolysandra coelestina
- Neolysandra corona
- Neozephyrus quercus
- Phengaris arion
- Phoenicurusia phoenicura
- Plebejidea afshar
- Plebejidea loewii
- Plebejus argus
- Plebejus christophi
- Plebejus idas
- Polyommatus aedon
- Polyommatus alcestis
- Polyommatus altivagans
- Polyommatus amandus
- Polyommatus arasbarani
- Polyommatus ardschirus
- Polyommatus baltazardi
- Polyommatus barmifiruze
- Polyommatus baytopi
- Polyommatus bogra
- Polyommatus caeruleus
- Polyommatus cyaneus
- Polyommatus dama
- Polyommatus damonides
- Polyommatus daphnis
- Polyommatus darius
- Polyommatus demavendi
- Polyommatus dizinensis
- Polyommatus eckweileri
- Polyommatus ectabanensis
- Polyommatus eros
- Polyommatus eroides
- Polyommatus erschoffii
- Polyommatus faramarzii
- Polyommatus firdussii
- Polyommatus forsteri
- Polyommatus glaucias
- Polyommatus hamadanensis
- Polyommatus icarus
- Polyommatus iphidamon
- Polyommatus kendevani
- Polyommatus klausschuriani
- Polyommatus mofidii
- Polyommatus morgani
- Polyommatus musa
- Polyommatus ninae
- Polyommatus peilei
- Polyommatus pfeifferi
- Polyommatus phyllis
- Polyommatus posthumus
- Polyommatus sennanensis
- Polyommatus shahrami
- Polyommatus shirkuhensis
- Polyommatus stempfferi
- Polyommatus tenhageni
- Polyommatus thersites
- Polyommatus transcaspicus
- Polyommatus turcicus
- Polyommatus valiabadi
- Polyommatus zardensis
- Pseudophilotes vicrama
- Rimisia miris
- Rubrapterus bavius
- Rueckbeilia rosei
- Satyrium abdominalis
- Satyrium hyrcanicum
- Satyrium ilicis
- Satyrium lunulatum
- Satyrium marcidum
- Satyrium sassanides
- Satyrium spini
- Talicada nyseus
- Tarucus balkanicus
- Tarucus rosaceus
- Tomares callimachus
- Tomares romanovi
- Turanana anisophtalma
- Turanana cytis
- Turanana endymion
- Zizeeria karsandra

== Hesperiidae ==
- Bibasis sena
- Carcharodus alceae
- Carcharodus dravira
- Carcharodus flocciferus
- Carcharodus lavatherae
- Carcharodus orientalis
- Carcharodus stauderi
- Carcharodus swinhoei
- Choaspes benjaminii
- Eogenes alcides
- Erynnis marloyi
- Erynnis tages
- Gegenes nostrodamus
- Gegenes pumilio
- Hesperia comma
- Muschampia plurimacula
- Muschampia poggei
- Muschampia proteides
- Muschampia proto
- Muschampia staudingeri
- Muschampia tessellum
- Ochlodes hyrcanus
- Ochlodes venatus
- Pelopidas thrax
- Pyrgus alveus
- Pyrgus armoricanus
- Pyrgus carthami
- Pyrgus cinarae
- Pyrgus jupei
- Pyrgus melotis
- Pyrgus serratulae
- Pyrgus sidae
- Spialia doris
- Spialia geron
- Spialia orbifer
- Spialia osthelderi
- Spialia phlomidis
- Thymelicus acteon
- Thymelicus hyrax
- Thymelicus lineola
- Thymelicus novus
- Thymelicus sylvestris
- Aeromachus dubius
- Aeromachus jhora
- Aeromachus pygmaeus
- Allora doleschallii

== See also ==
- List of moths of Iran
