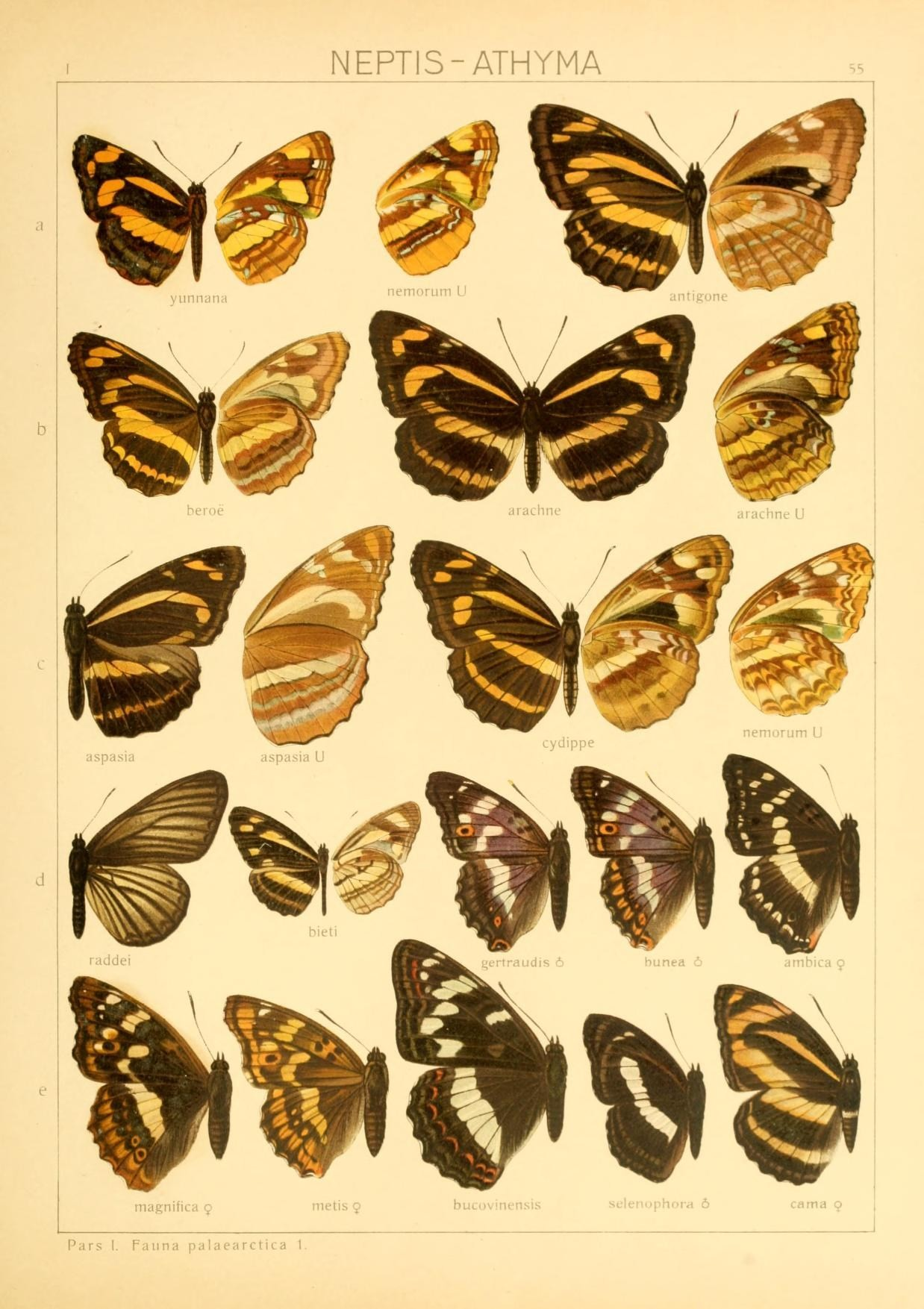
- Aldania yunnana in Seitz (55a)

Scientific classification
- Domain: Eukaryota
- Kingdom: Animalia
- Phylum: Arthropoda
- Class: Insecta
- Order: Lepidoptera
- Family: Nymphalidae
- Genus: Aldania
- Species: A. yunnana

Binomial name
- Aldania yunnana (Oberthür, 1906)

= Aldania yunnana =

Species of butterfly

Aldania yunnana is a butterfly found in the Palearctic where it is endemic to China that belongs to the browns family.

== Description from Seitz ==
N. yunnana Oberth. (55a) is extremely similar to the previous forms, smaller, the position of the markings as in Aldania thisbe, their colour bright yellow-ochre, the median band of the hindwing comparatively broad, canary yellow beneath, as are also the spots of the forewing. Before the band of the hindwing a reddish brown area in which are situated several purplish spots; costal margin ochreous yellow at the base, the distal margin brownish, traversed by reddish brown curved lines. Tsekou.
