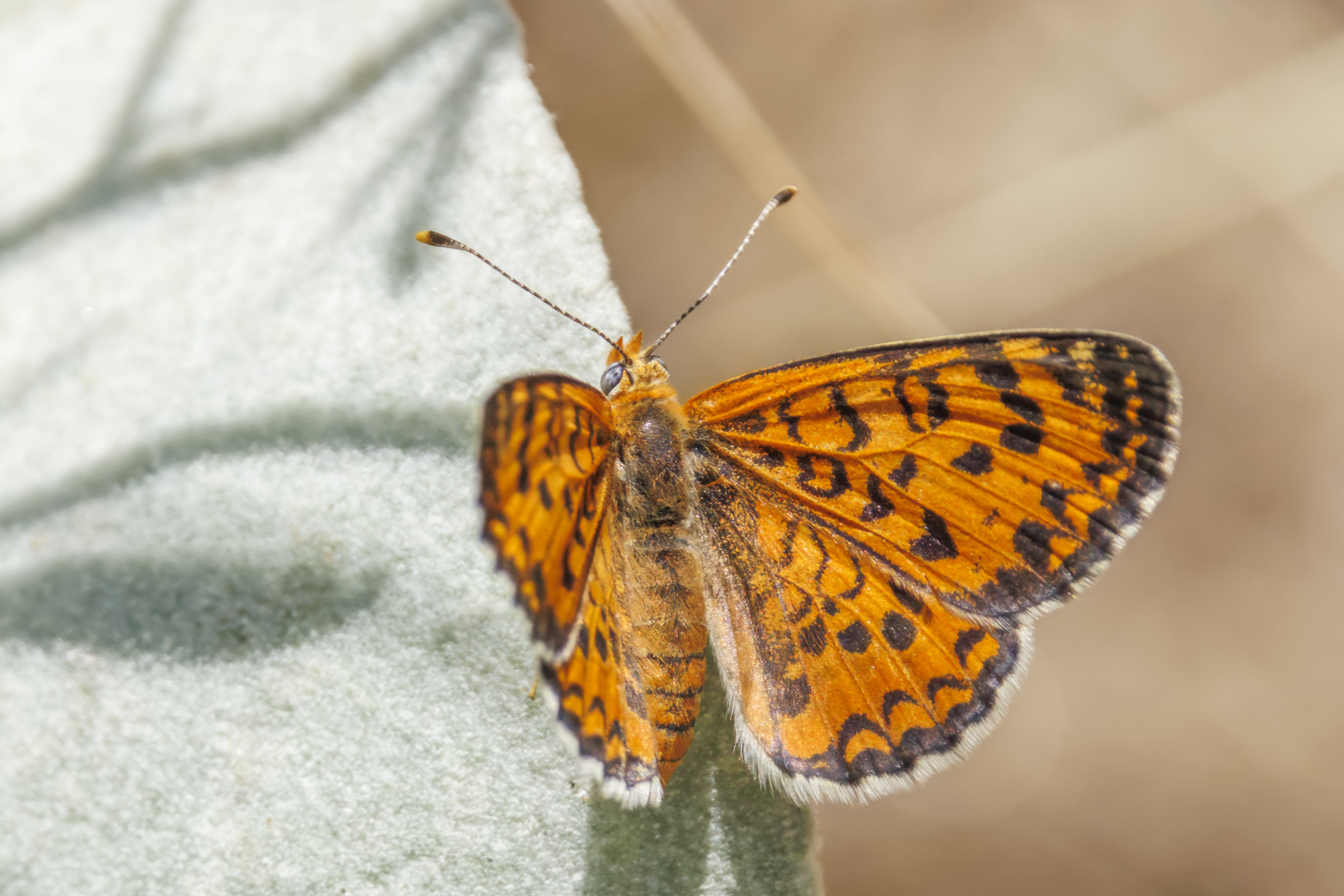
- Female, Turkey
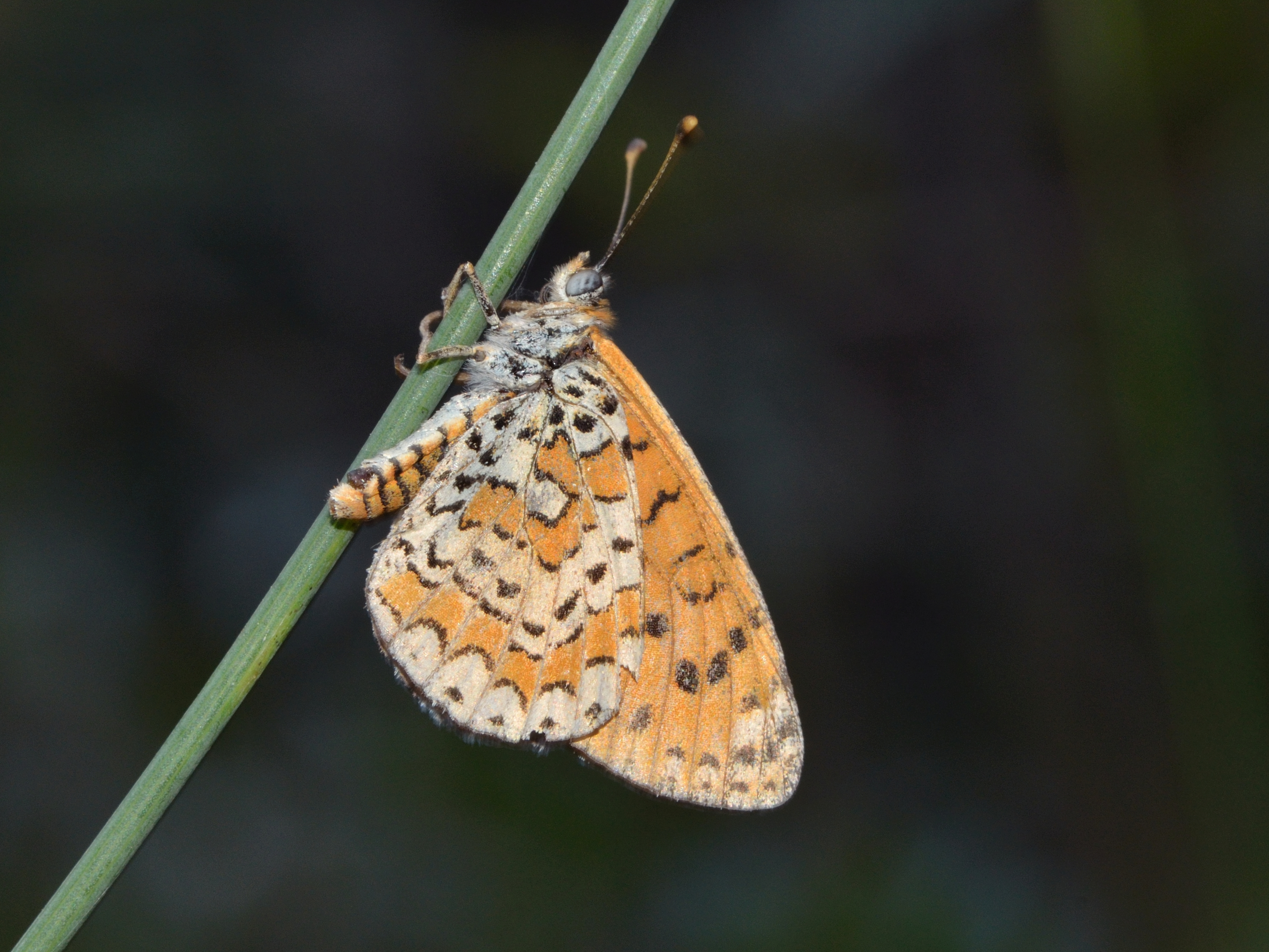

Scientific classification
- Kingdom: Animalia
- Phylum: Arthropoda
- Clade: Pancrustacea
- Class: Insecta
- Order: Lepidoptera
- Family: Nymphalidae
- Genus: Melitaea
- Species: M. trivia

Binomial name
- Melitaea trivia Denis & Schiffermüller, 1775

= Melitaea trivia =

Species of butterfly

Melitaea trivia, the lesser spotted fritillary, is a butterfly of the family Nymphalidae, part of the sub-family Nymphalinae.

== Distribution ==
It is found in the southern part of the Palearctic realm. In Europe it is sometimes called the desert fritillary, but this name also refers to the North African relative M. deserticola.

It was first described in 1775 by entomologists Michael Denis and Ignaz Schiffermüller under the basionym Papilio trivia.

== Description ==
The wingspan is 15–23 mm. At first sight it is somewhat similar to Melitaea didyma but the black lunules before the margin united and the disc traversed by a strongly flexuose macular band, the hindwing with abundant, connected, black markings on the disc. The female with the ground-colour centrally more or less pale, especially on the forewing.

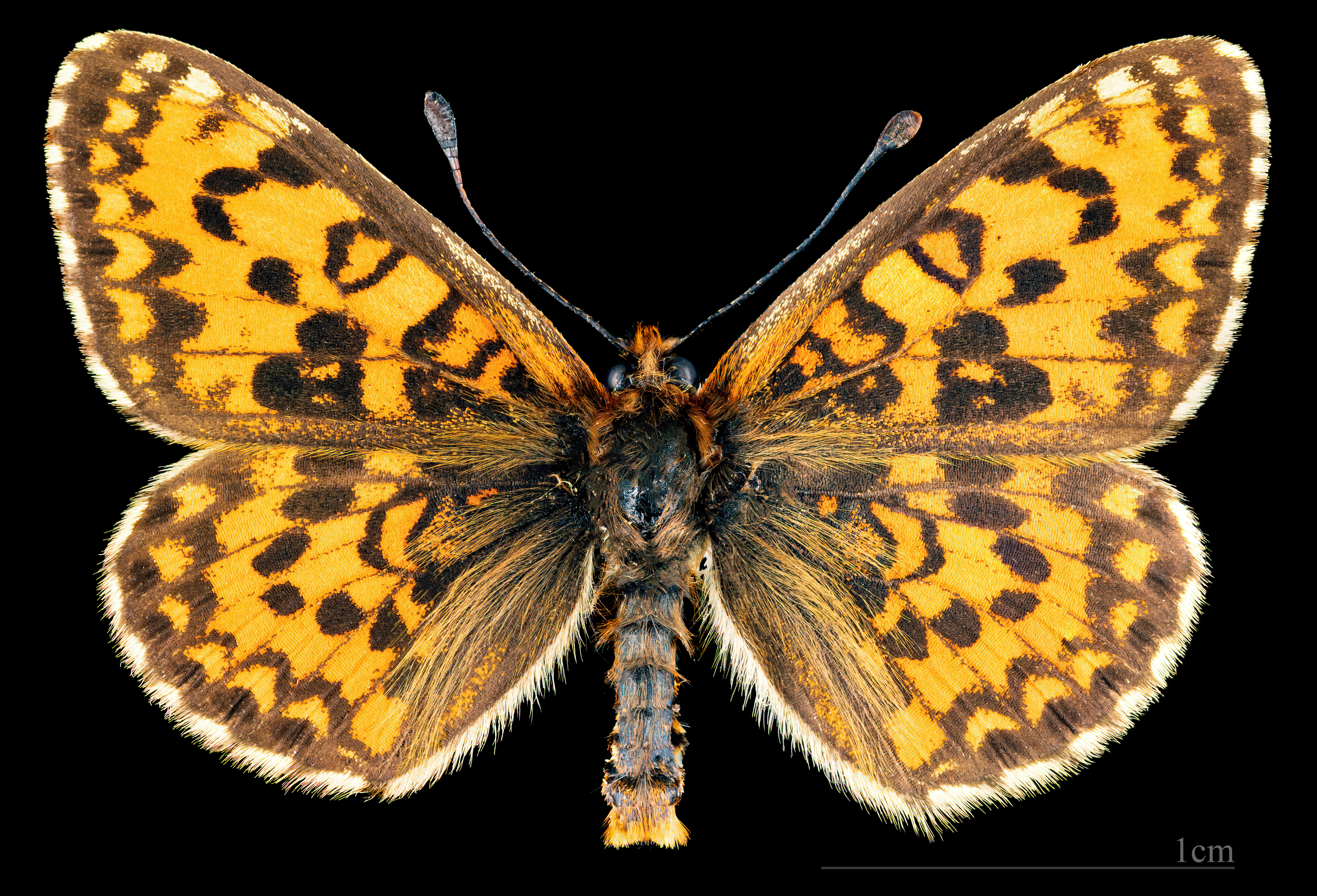
Melitaea trivia ♂

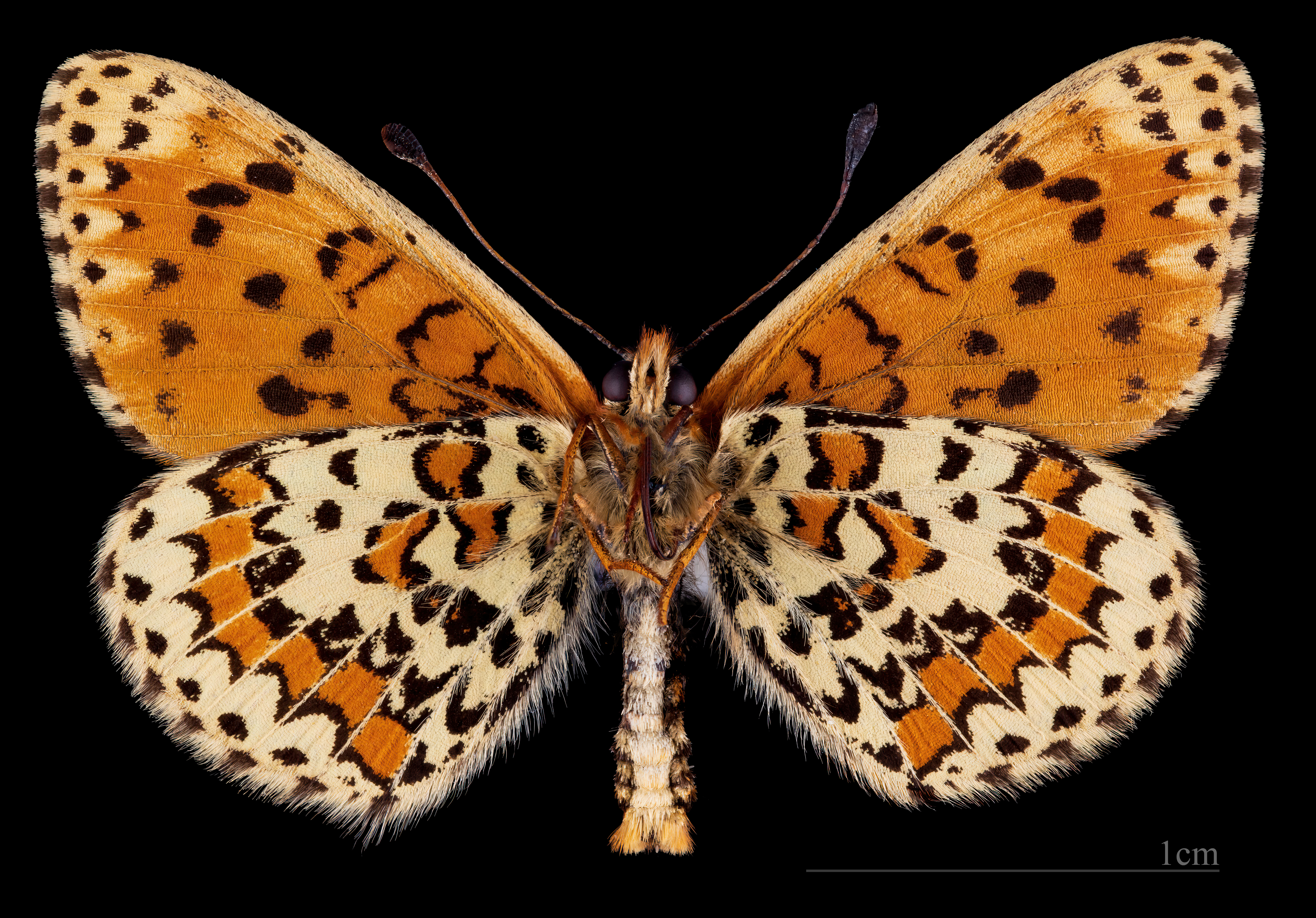
Melitaea trivia ♂ △

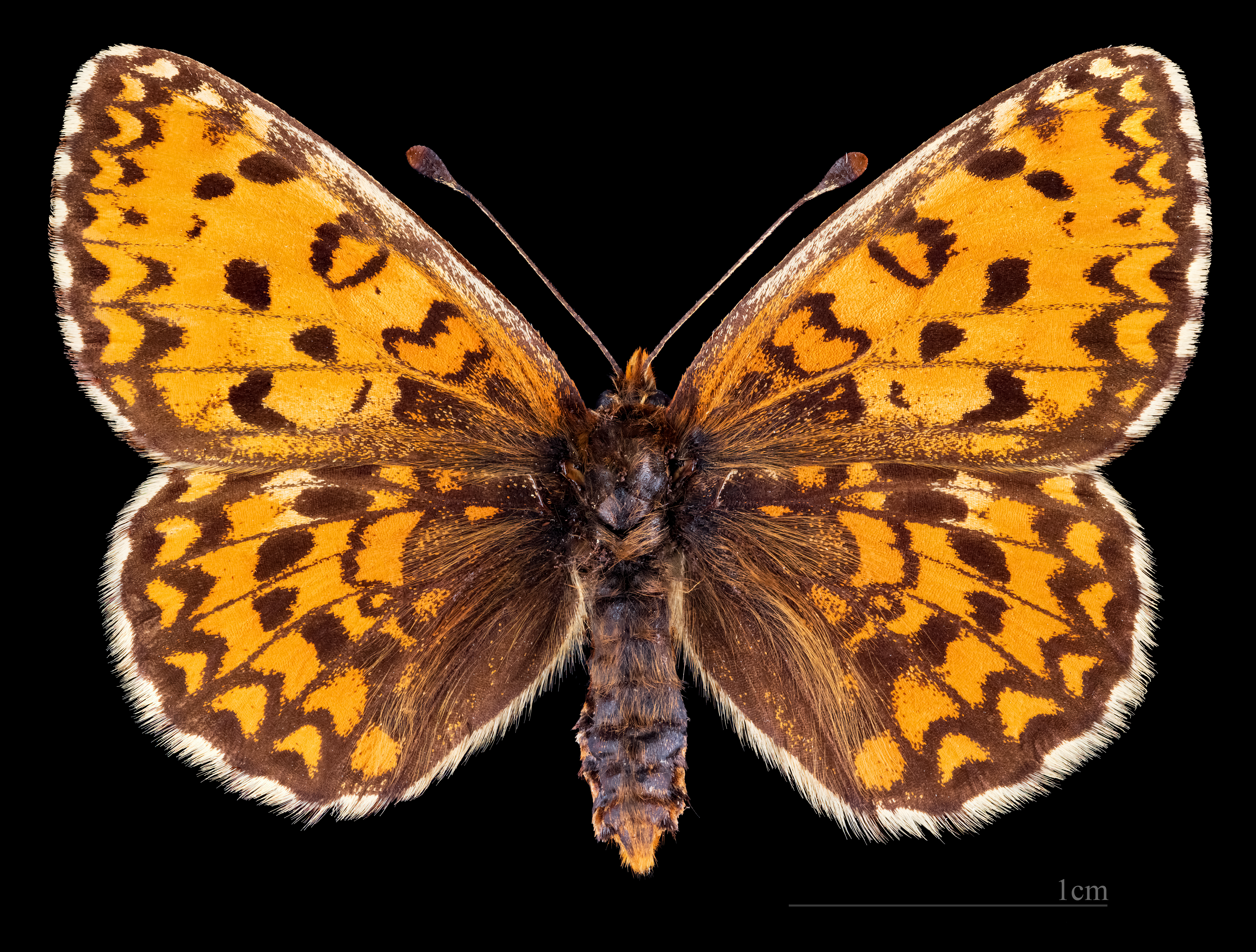
Melitaea trivia ♀

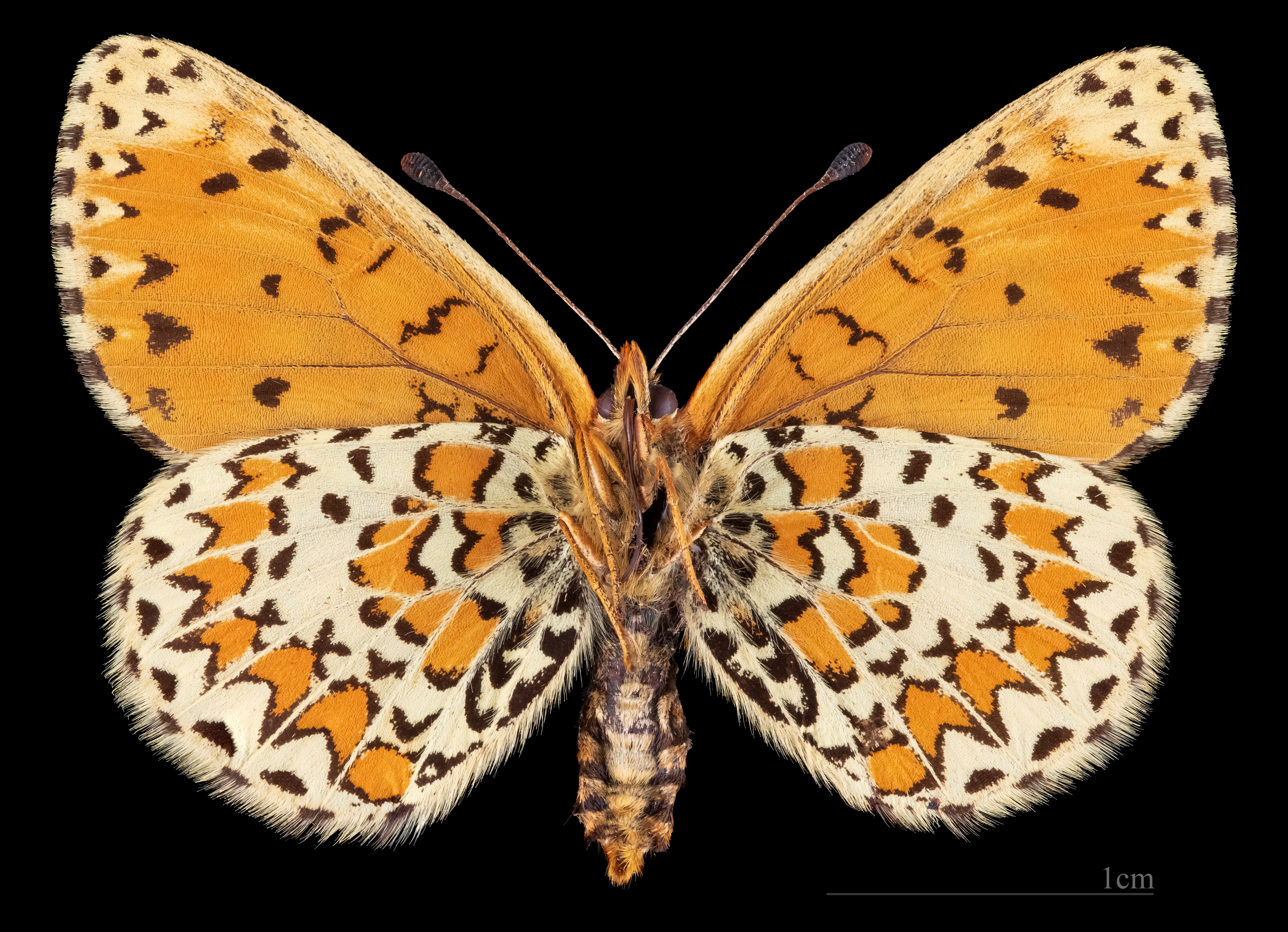
Melitaea trivia ♀ △

The larva of trivia is leaden grey, with bluish dots and dark dorsal stripe, the sides being striated with brownish, the soft spines whitish, the prolegs dotted with black. The pupa is very stout, anteriorly somewhat swollen, pearl-grey or dull whitish yellow, with small black dots, of which those on the wing-cases do not correspond to the spots of the wings. Some of the black spots, especially those on the abdomen, are ornamented with red or yellow.

== Biology ==
The flight period of butterflies in the northern parts of the range lasts from mid-June to early July and in August (two generations develop per year), in the steppe zone - from mid-May to the end of June and from mid-July to the end of August.The butterfly is found in meadows and on roads, particularly also on sunny slopes, and is not rare in most places where it occurs, but does not often fly in such numbers as didyma. Eggs are 0.5 mm in diameter and 0.6 mm in height. Development takes 5-6 days. Caterpillars develop in July-August and from autumn to April on various mulleins (Verbascum ). In the Caucasus, the food plant is figwort ( Scrophularia ). Caterpillars go through 5 instars. The caterpillar stage lasts 13-15 days. The pupal stage lasts 5-7 days. The length of the pupa is 9-13 mm.

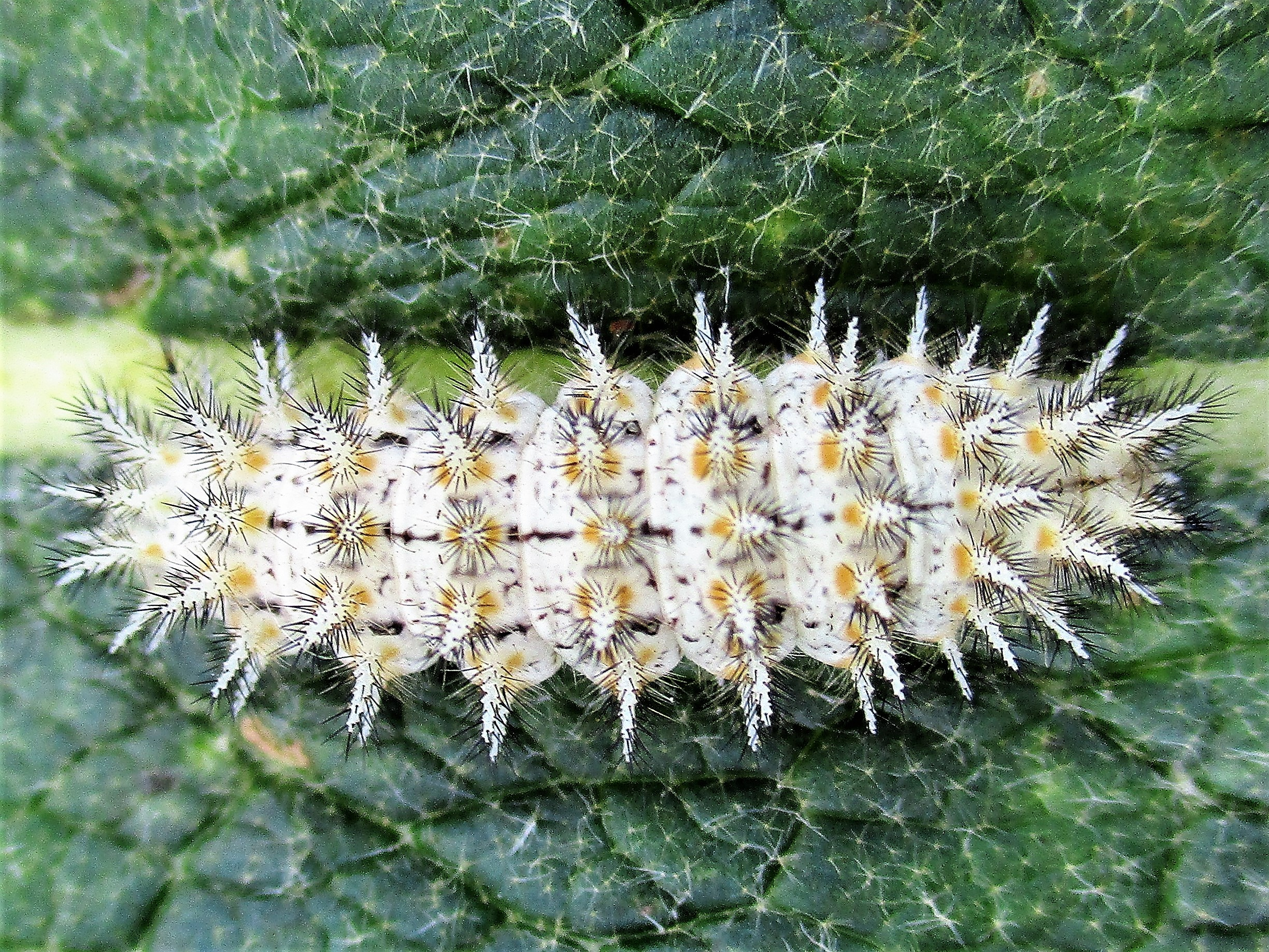
larva

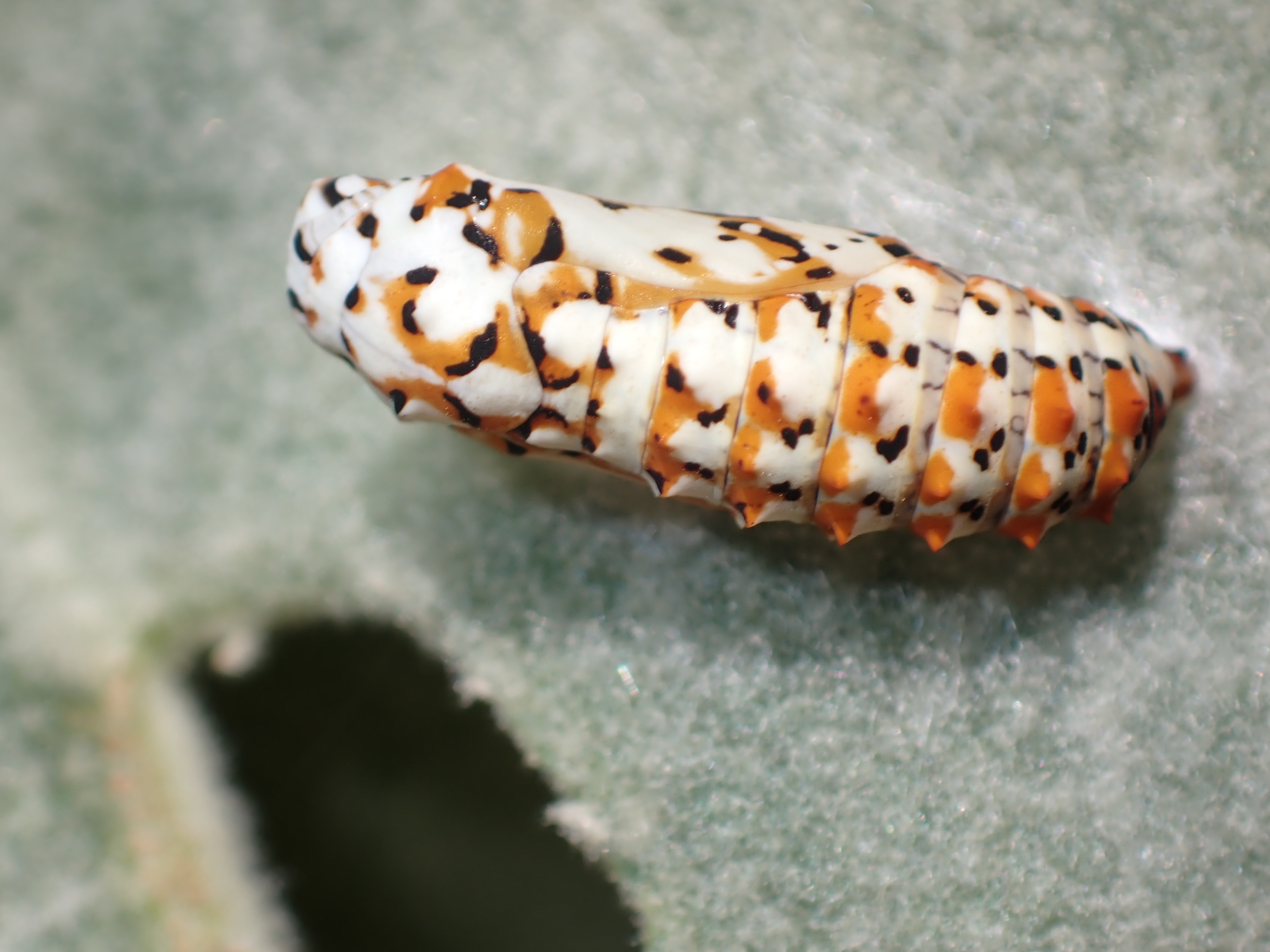
pupa

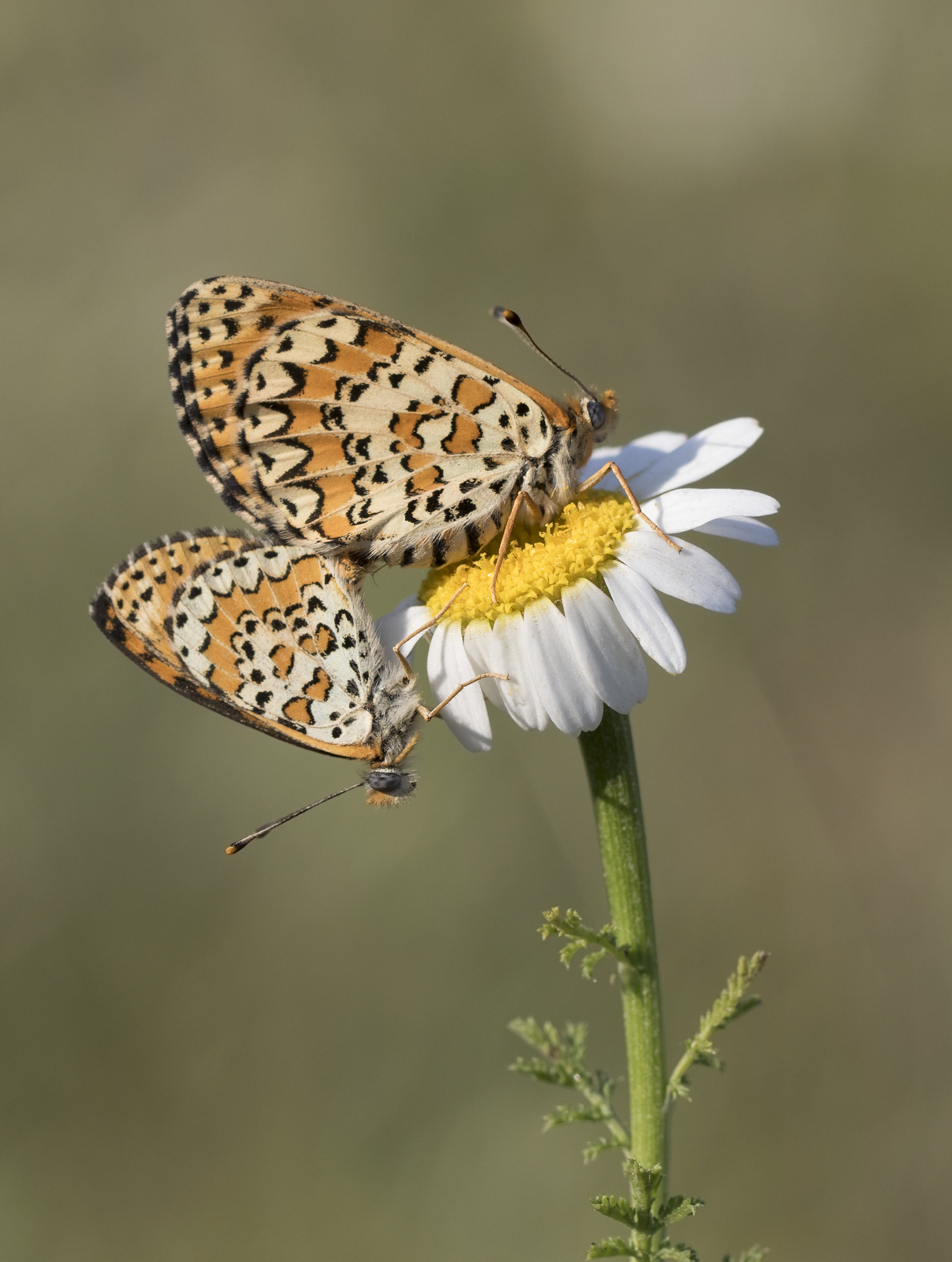
pair in copula

== Subspecies ==
- Melitaea trivia catapelia Staudinger, 1886
- Melitaea trivia caucasi Verity, 1922 (Caucasus and Transcaucasia)
- Melitaea trivia chorosana Shchetkin, 1984 (South Ghissar) (Tacikistan).
- Melitaea trivia fascelis (Esper, 1783) – in the south of Europe.
- Melitaea trivia ignasiti Sagarra, 1926 – in the Iberian Peninsula. This taxon tends to be considered as the distinct species : Melitaea ignasiti.
- Melitaea trivia nana Staudinger, 1871(Kopet-Dagh Mountains)
- Melitaea trivia nativa Tuzov, 2000 (Western Pamirs)
- Melitaea trivia petri Shchetkin, 1984 (Darvaz)
- Melitaea trivia singularia Korshunov, 1995 (Tuva and Siberia)
- Melitaea trivia uvarovi Gorbunov, 1995 (Kazakhstan, Siberia, and Alatau mountains)

== Taxonomy ==
The nominate subspecies inhabits the territory of Eastern Europe; however, due to the high individual and geographic variability and seasonal dimorphism, a certain number of infrasubspecific taxa and subspecies have been described, which have been interpreted differently by different researchers.

== Common names ==
- In German: Braunlicher Scheckenfalter
- In French: Mélitée du bouillon-blanc
- In English: Lesser Spotted Fritillary or Desert Fritillary
