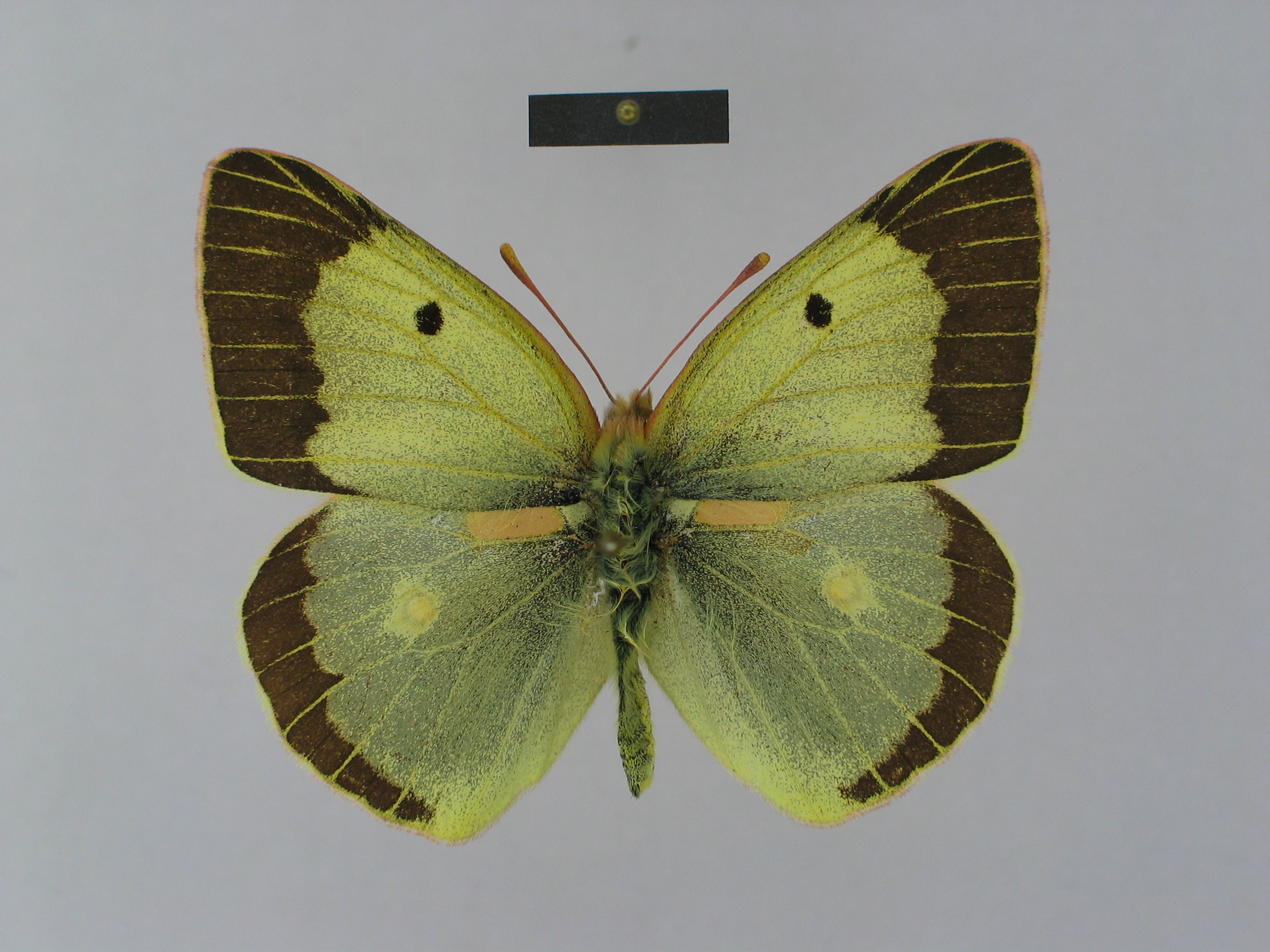

Scientific classification
- Kingdom: Animalia
- Phylum: Arthropoda
- Clade: Pancrustacea
- Class: Insecta
- Order: Lepidoptera
- Family: Pieridae
- Genus: Colias
- Species: C. chlorocoma

Binomial name
- Colias chlorocoma Christoph, 1888

Synonyms
- Colias chlorocoma ochracea Verhulst, 1993; Colias chlorocoma ♀ ab. sulphurea Miller, [1913]; Colias chlorocoma aladagensis Verhulst, 1993

= Colias chlorocoma =

Species of butterfly

Colias chlorocoma is a butterfly in the family Pieridae found in Transcaucasia, Turkey and Iran.

== Taxonomy ==
Originally described as Colias chlorocoma Christoph, 1888. Röber considered C. chlorocoma to be an apparently very rare, local form of Colias libanotica- "C. chlorocoma Christ., from Southern Armenia (Kasikoparan), is presumably a local form of libanotica; it is large, the ground-colour being greenish in the male, white in the female. Apparently very rare." Treated as a species of Colias Fabricius, 1807 by Tuzov et al.

Grieshuber & Gerardo Lamas consider that C. chlorocoma is very closely related to and possibly conspecific with Colias sagartia but androconial spots are rare in chlorocoma and males have yellow spots in the marginal band. The flight, the biotopes, and the foodplants of the two taxa are identical. C. chlorocoma is rather variable, in particular the green wing pigmentation differs from population to population but is usually greenish-yellow, C. sagartia is greenish.

Oorschot, H. & Wagener, S. treat all the subspecies as junior synonyms

== Subspecies ==
- Colias chlorocoma chlorocoma (Turkey)
- Colias chlorocoma aladagensis Verhulst, 1993 (Turkey)
- Colias chlorocoma tkatschukovi O. Bang-Haas, 1936 (Armenia, Azerbaijan)
- Colias chlorocoma wyatti Häuser & Schurian, 1978 (Iran)
