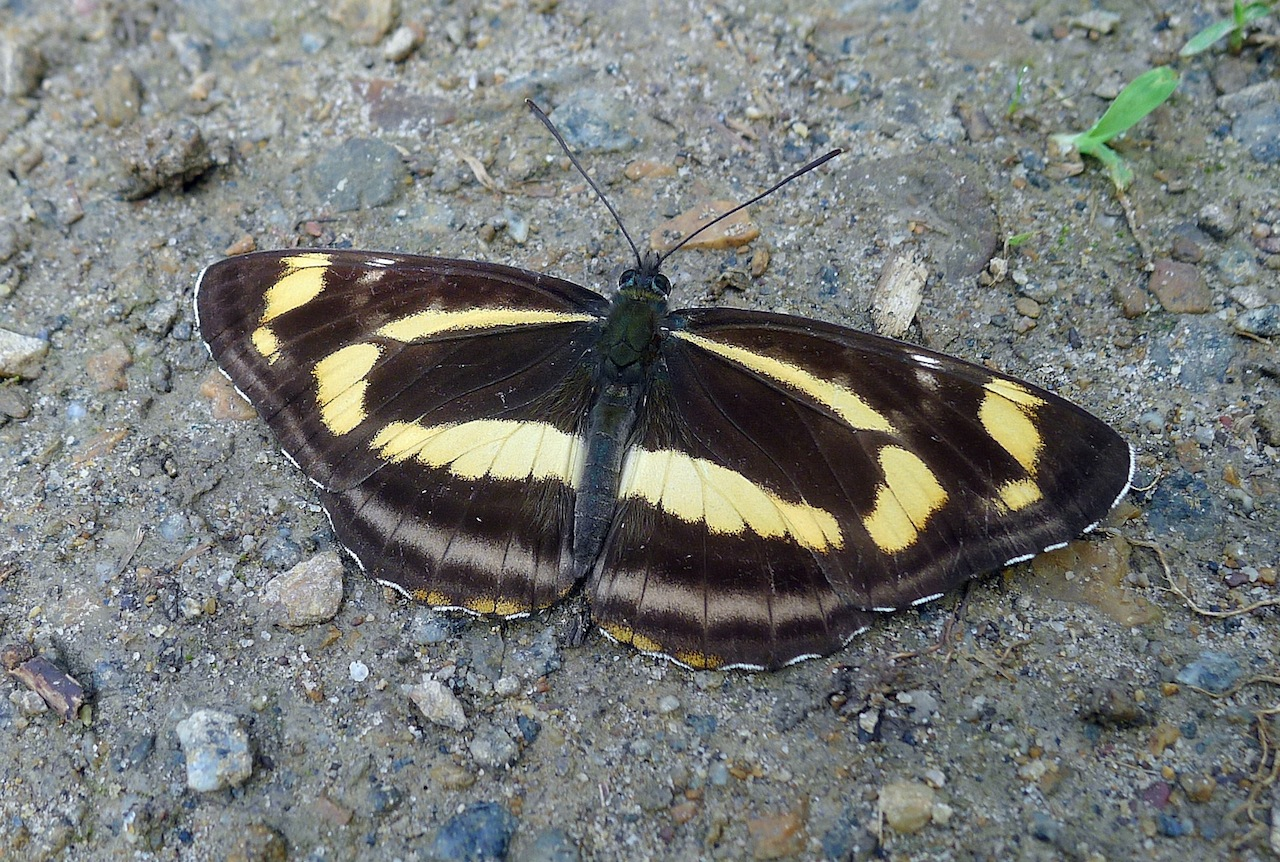
- Aldania thisbe

Scientific classification
- Domain: Eukaryota
- Kingdom: Animalia
- Phylum: Arthropoda
- Class: Insecta
- Order: Lepidoptera
- Family: Nymphalidae
- Subfamily: Limenitidinae
- Genus: Aldania; Moore, 1896

= Aldania =

Genus of brush-footed butterflies

Aldania is a butterfly genus of the Limenitidinae. The genus is confined to the temperate East Palearctic. Aldania is closely related to Neptis.

== Species ==
- Aldania deliquata (Stichel, 1909) Transbaikalia, Amur, Ussuri, Northeast China, Korea.
- Aldania ilos Frühstorfer, 1909 Northeast China, Amur, Ussuri, West China, Taiwan
- Aldania imitans (Oberthür, 1897) Aldania Mimic - Yunnan
- Aldania raddei (Bremer, 1861) Amur, Ussuri
- Aldania themis (Leech, 1890) Ussuri, China, Korea
- Aldania thisbe (Ménétries, 1859)
- Aldania yunnana (Oberthür, 1906) Yunnan
