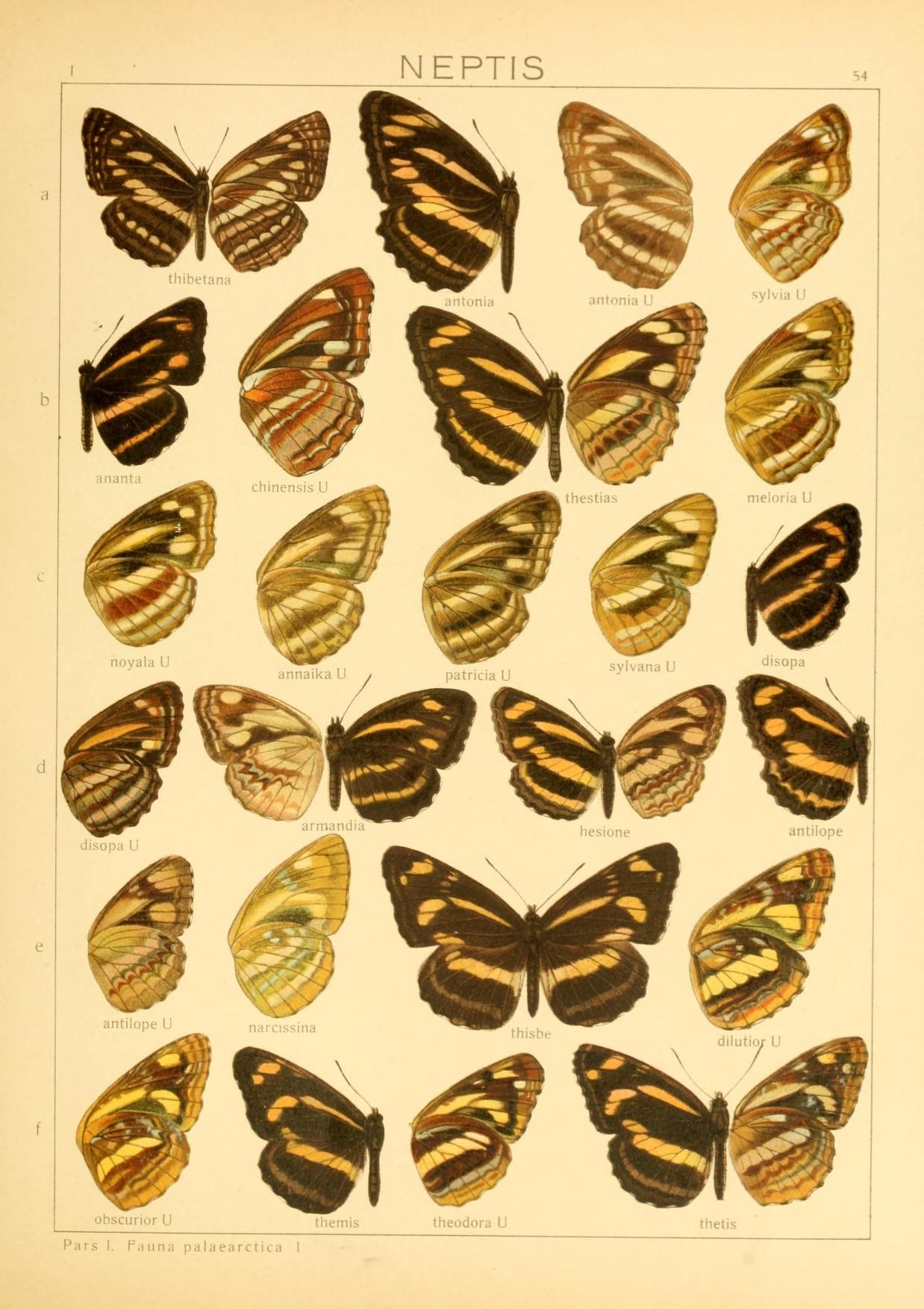
- Aldania themis in Seitz (54f)

Scientific classification
- Domain: Eukaryota
- Kingdom: Animalia
- Phylum: Arthropoda
- Class: Insecta
- Order: Lepidoptera
- Family: Nymphalidae
- Genus: Aldania
- Species: A. themis

Binomial name
- Aldania themis (Leech, 1890)

= Aldania themis =

Species of butterfly

Aldania themis is a butterfly found in the East Palearctic (Ussuri, China, Korea) that belongs to the browns family.

== Subspecies ==
- Aldania themis themis Hubei, Sichuan, Gansu, Shaanxi
- Aldania themis muri (Eliot, 1969) North China
- Aldania themis neotibetana (Huang, 1998) Yigong

== Description from Seitz ==
N. themis Leech (54f) differs from the preceding species in the median band on the hindwing beneath being anteriorly abbreviated and in the 2—3 violet spots standing in the prolongation of the band being absent; on the other hand, there is on the forewing below a large light spot near the distal margin between the radials.*) The distribution-area of this form according to Oberthur extends from West China (Siaolou) to Sikkim, where it is replaced by the nomenclatorially typical form, N. nycteus Nicev., which has white instead of yellow spots. *Contrary to customary treatment N. themis and thisbe are here dealt with as different species. In this I follow Ch. Oberthur's opinion (Etudes de Lepidopterol. Comparee II), although the differences do not appear to be quite sufficient for specific separation. There can hardly be any doubt that the classification of the species of Neptis, especially of the thetis group, will be modified in many respects as our knowledge of the geographical distribution and seasonal variation increases. At present one has to be content with a grouping which is the more probably correct classification according to one's personal opinion. As not weighty enough I must regard the characters of a number of species described by Oberthur in the place cited; particularly the separation of thisbe from themis and the specific value attributed to some forms of the thestias series does not seem to be tenable. — Stichel.
