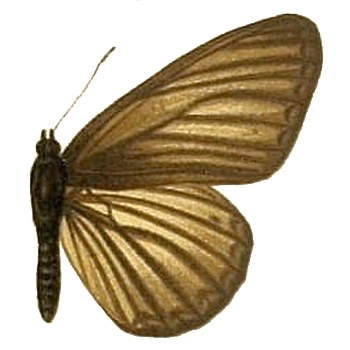
- Aldania raddei in Seitz 55d

Scientific classification
- Domain: Eukaryota
- Kingdom: Animalia
- Phylum: Arthropoda
- Class: Insecta
- Order: Lepidoptera
- Family: Nymphalidae
- Genus: Aldania
- Species: A. raddei

Binomial name
- Aldania raddei (Bremer, 1861)

Synonyms
- Diadema raddei Bremer, 1861

= Aldania raddei =

Species of butterfly

Aldania raddei is a butterfly found in the East Palearctic (Amur, Ussuri) that belongs to the browns family.

== Description from Seitz ==
raddei Brem. (55d) stands entirely apart in facies; a remarkable species, which must be placed in the present genus [Neptis] as it agrees with the same in its morphological characters. Moore has erected for its reception a special genus, Aldania. Ground-colour white, dusted with grey-brown at the margins, the base and along the veins, the veins themselves blackish, a row of dark lunules along the margin, being especially distinct on the underside. — Amurland: Bureja Mts., Ussuri.

== Biology ==
The larva feeds on Ulmus propinqua.

== Etymology ==
The name honours Gustav Radde.

== See also ==
- List of butterflies of Russia
