= Phoenicurusia phoenicura =

Scientific classification
- Kingdom: Animalia
- Phylum: Arthropoda
- Class: Insecta
- Order: Lepidoptera
- Family: Lycaenidae
- Genus: Phoenicurusia
- Species: P. phoenicura

Binomial name
- Phoenicurusia phoenicura (Lederer, 1870)

Synonyms
- Athamanthia phoenicura Lycaena phoenicurus Polyommatus phoenicurus Polyommatus scintillans Phoenicurusia phoenicurus

Species of butterfly

Phoenicurusia phoenicura is a butterfly of the family Lycaenidae.
