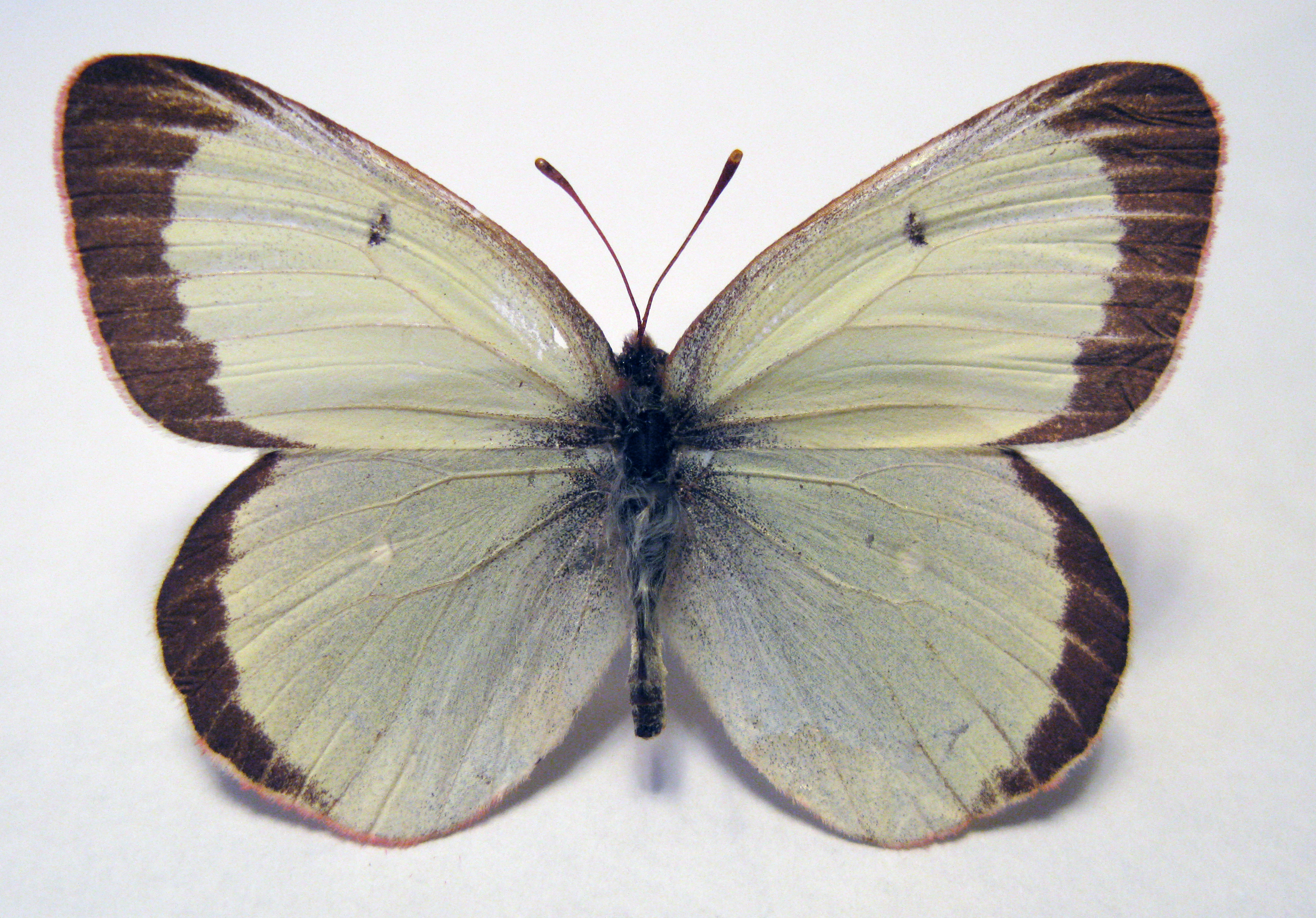
- Male

Scientific classification
- Kingdom: Animalia
- Phylum: Arthropoda
- Class: Insecta
- Order: Lepidoptera
- Family: Pieridae
- Genus: Colias
- Species: C. marcopolo

Binomial name
- Colias marcopolo (Grum-Grshimailo, 1888)

Synonyms
- Colias marcopolo f. diana Schulte, 1989; Colias nicopolo Röber, [1907]

= Colias marcopolo =

Marco Polo's colias

Species of butterfly

Colias marcopolo, the Marco Polo's colias, is a butterfly in the family Pieridae found in the Pamir Mountains the Hindu Kush and Afghanistan.

== Description ==
Colias marcopolo is one of the smaller species. Upperside of male pale sulphur yellow, with a not very broad greyish black distal marginal band and an inconspicuous large yellow spot on the hindwing, but without a black middle spot on the forewing. Underside of forewing dirty yellow, with greyish-green distal margin; hindwing darker greyish green, with whitish middle spot. The female is yolk colour above and below, the distal marginal band being broader and having the inner edge diffuse, the forewing bearing yellow submarginal spots. The form with brighter yellow upperside, narrower dark distal margins and a black middle spot on the forewing above and below, is named ab.? nicolopolo.

== Biology ==
The larva feeds on species of Astragalus.

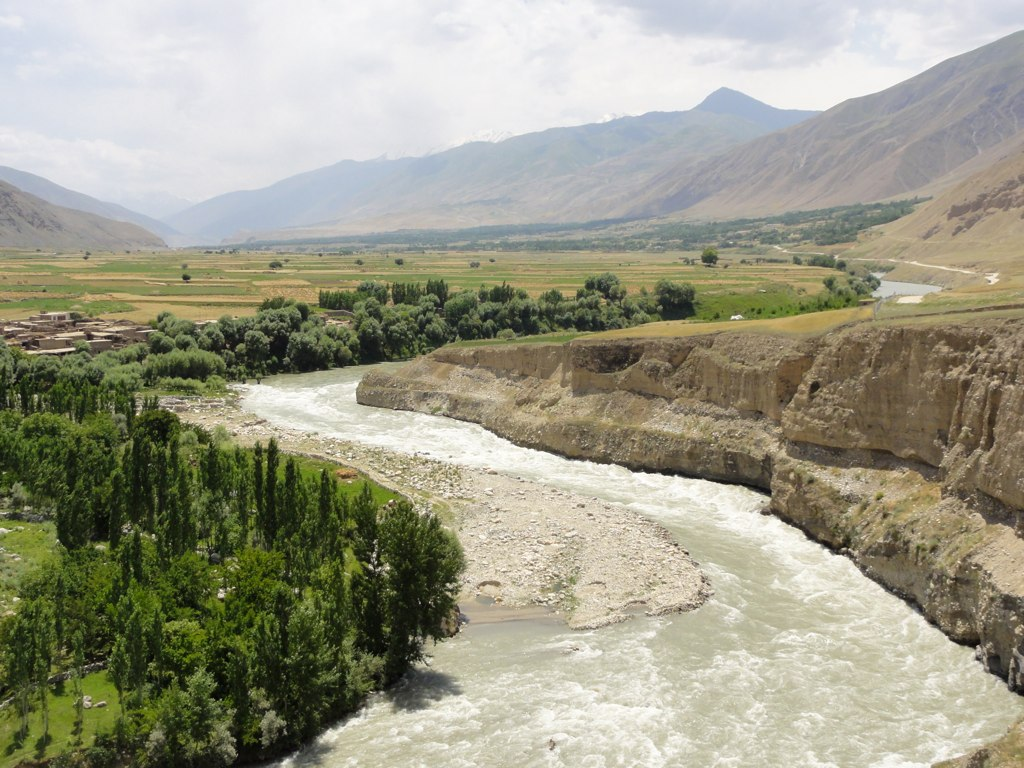
Montane habitat in Afghanistan

== Biotope ==
A montane species found between 3000 and 5000 metres a.s.l.

== Subspecies ==
- C. m. marcopolo Pamirs, Hindukush
- C. m. afganipolo Schulte, 1977 Afghanistan
- C. m. kushana Wyatt & Omoto, 1966 Afghanistan

== Etymology ==
The species is named for Marco Polo.
