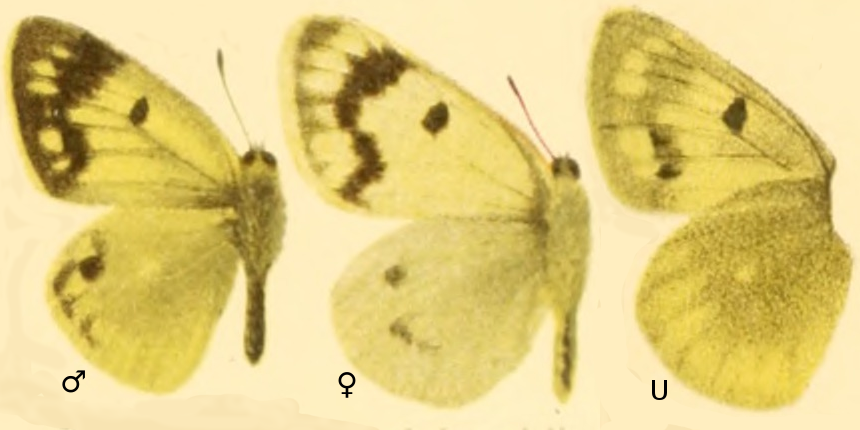

Scientific classification
- Kingdom: Animalia
- Phylum: Arthropoda
- Clade: Pancrustacea
- Class: Insecta
- Order: Lepidoptera
- Family: Pieridae
- Genus: Colias
- Species: C. alpherakii

Binomial name
- Colias alpherakii Staudinger, 1882

= Colias alpherakii =

Species of butterfly

Colias alpherakii is a butterfly in the family Pieridae found in Central Asia.

== Description ==
Lighter or deeper yellow above, with well developed and sharply defined black marginal and submarginal markings and black middle spot on the forewing; the hindwing with reduced marginal marking, sometimes without any, the light-coloured middle spot being very feebly developed; upperside of forewing sometimes more or less dusted with black along the veins. Underside light yellow, with large black middle spot, and more or less developed black submarginal spots posteriorly on forewing; hindwing dusted with dark on the inner area, this scaling sometimes extended to the margin, the middle spot being whitish. The ground colour of the female is lighter, the black markings are less developed, being very diffuse especially at the distal margin of the forewing; the black middle spot, however, large. Beneath, the apex of the forewing bright yellow and the hindwing dusted with grey greenish.

== Biology ==
The larval food plant is Onobrychis echidna.

== Subspecies ==
Listed alphabetically:

- C. a. chitralensis Verity, 1911 – Pakistan (Chitral)
- C. a. kohibaba Wyatt & Omoto, 1966 – Afghanistan, Tadzhikistan (western Pamir)
- C. a. roschana Grum-Grshimailo, 1893 – north-western Pamir, smaller than nominate, and the hindwing has a dark distal marginal band
- C. a. tashkurgonica Kesküla, 1997 – Uzbekistan
- C. a. usmatica Shchetkin, 1990 – Uzbekistan (western Turkestan Range)
