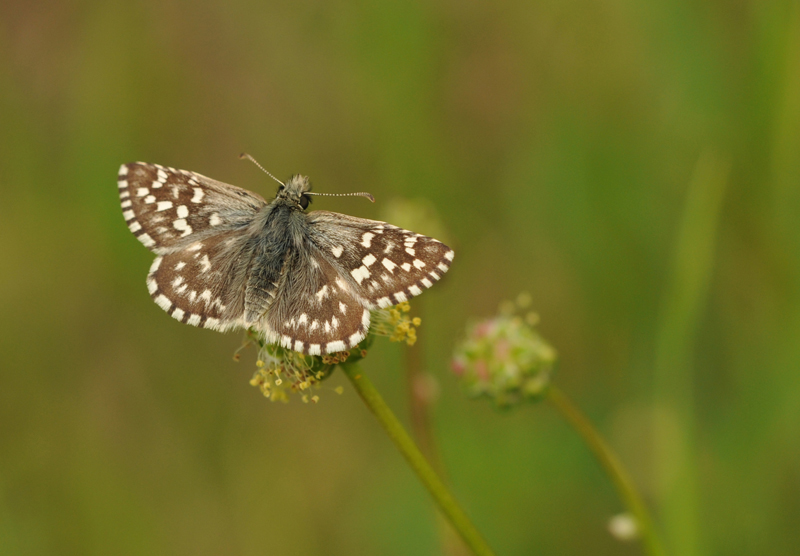

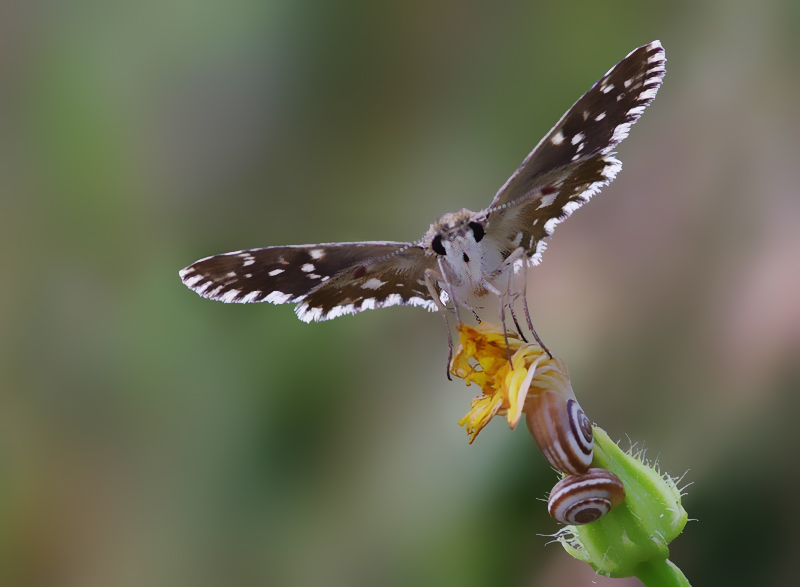

Scientific classification
- Kingdom: Animalia
- Phylum: Arthropoda
- Class: Insecta
- Order: Lepidoptera
- Family: Hesperiidae
- Genus: Pyrgus
- Species: P. melotis

Binomial name
- Pyrgus melotis (Duponchel, [1834])

Synonyms
- Hesperia melotis Duponchel, [1834]

= Pyrgus melotis =

Species of skipper butterfly genus Pyrgus

Pyrgus melotis, the Aegean skipper, is a butterfly of the family Hesperiidae. It was described by Philogène Auguste Joseph Duponchel in 1832. It is found in the Caucasus, Transcaucasia, Asia Minor, Greece and the Middle East. It is a member of the Pyrgus malvae (grizzled skipper) species complex but separated by significant reproductive isolation mechanisms. The habitat consists of grasslands and slopes.

The length of the forewings is 11–15 mm. It is characterized by the underside of the hindwings, which is cream-coloured, thus obscuring the markings; the spots on the upperside, especially those of the forewings, are generally large and square. Adults are on wing from April to June and again from July to September in two or sometimes three generations per year.

Larvae have been recorded feeding on Rubus species.

== Subspecies ==
- Pyrgus melotis melotis
- Pyrgus melotis ponticus Reverdin, 1914 (Caucasus, Transcaucasia)
