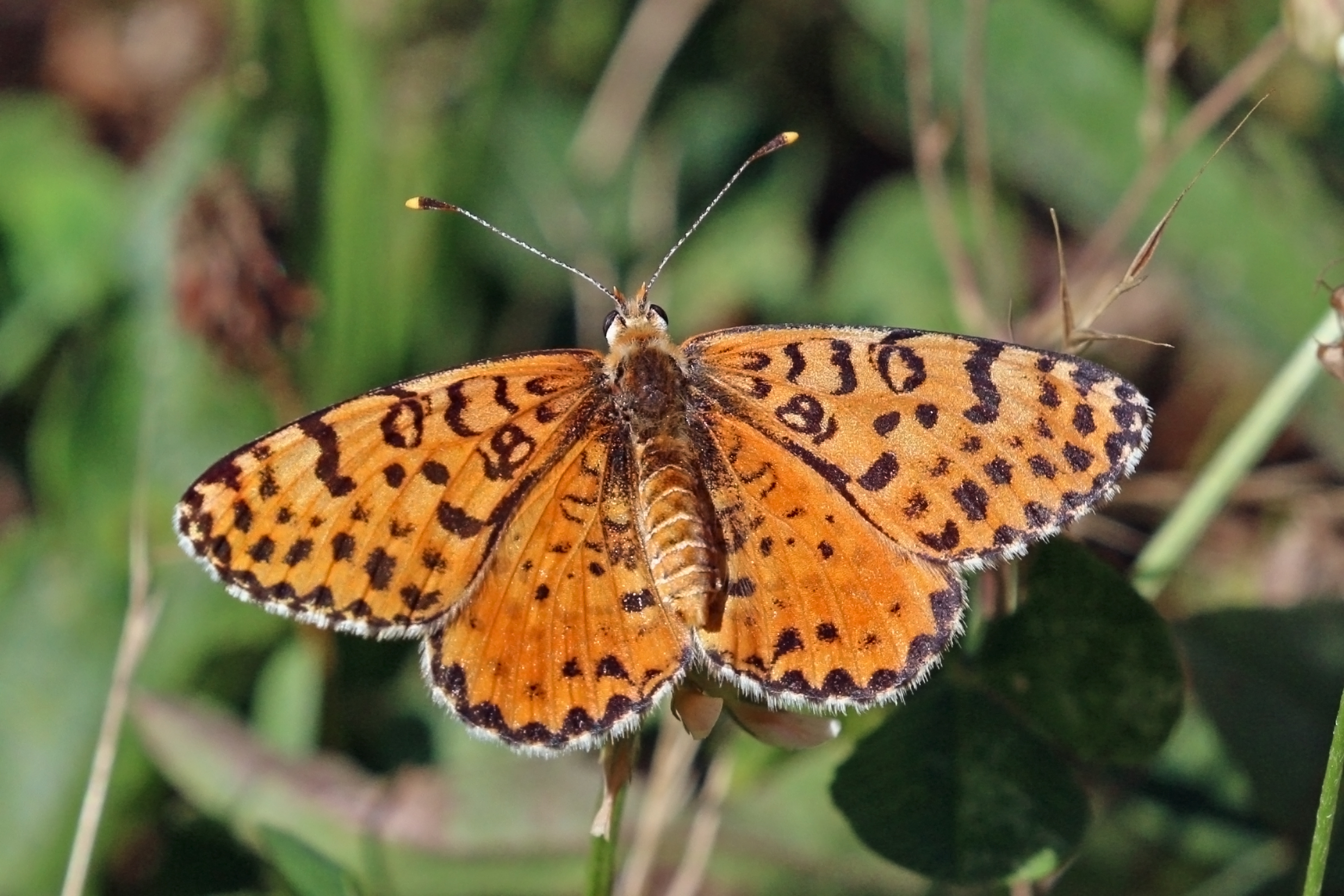

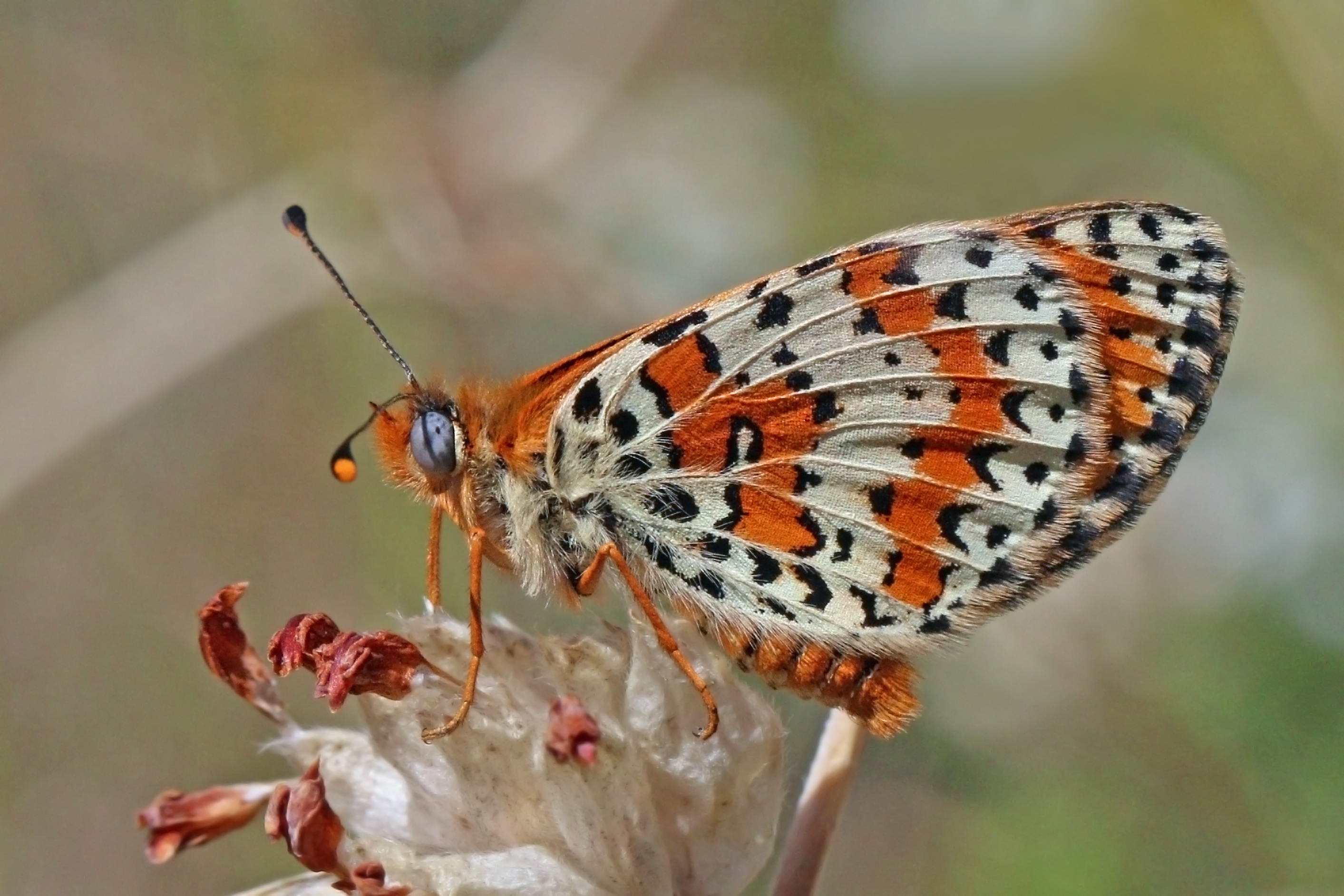
- Two spotted fritillaries in the Republic of North Macedonia

Scientific classification
- Kingdom: Animalia
- Phylum: Arthropoda
- Class: Insecta
- Order: Lepidoptera
- Family: Nymphalidae
- Genus: Melitaea
- Species: M. didyma

Binomial name
- Melitaea didyma (Esper, 1778)

Subspecies
- See text

= Melitaea didyma =

Species of butterfly

Melitaea didyma, the spotted fritillary or red-band fritillary, is a Palearctic butterfly of the family Nymphalidae.

== Description ==
Melitaea didyma is a medium-sized butterfly with a wingspan reaching 35–50 millimetres (1.4–2.0 in). The overside of the wings is a bright orange-brown with dark brown markings arranged in rows, which are quite variable in quantity and size. Sometimes the colour of the females is a duller orange, shaded with grey-green. The underside of the wings is chequered pale yellow and pale orange. M. didyma has seasonal forms and sexual dimorphism. The male is fiery red, with a narrow dentate black distal border and a moderate number of small black dots and spots, which are dispersed over the basal half of the wing and end with a short band extending beyond the cell from the costa into the disc. On the underside, which is very abundantly marked with small black dots and hooks, a flexuose subbasal band and a curved submarginal one are situated on a delicately greenish, or yellowish, white ground. In the female the forewing and the anal area of the hindwing are much paler, being moreover dusted with blackish, while the costal half of the hindwing has preserved the red tint : the whole wings are much more abundantly but less prominently marked with black. There occur sometimes specimens with a blue gloss on the upperside.

== Biology ==
This butterfly flies from March to October depending on the location. This species has two or three generations and overwinters as young caterpillar.

The larvae feed on various plants, including Linaria, Plantago lanceolata, Veronica, Centaurea jacea and Digitalis purpurea.

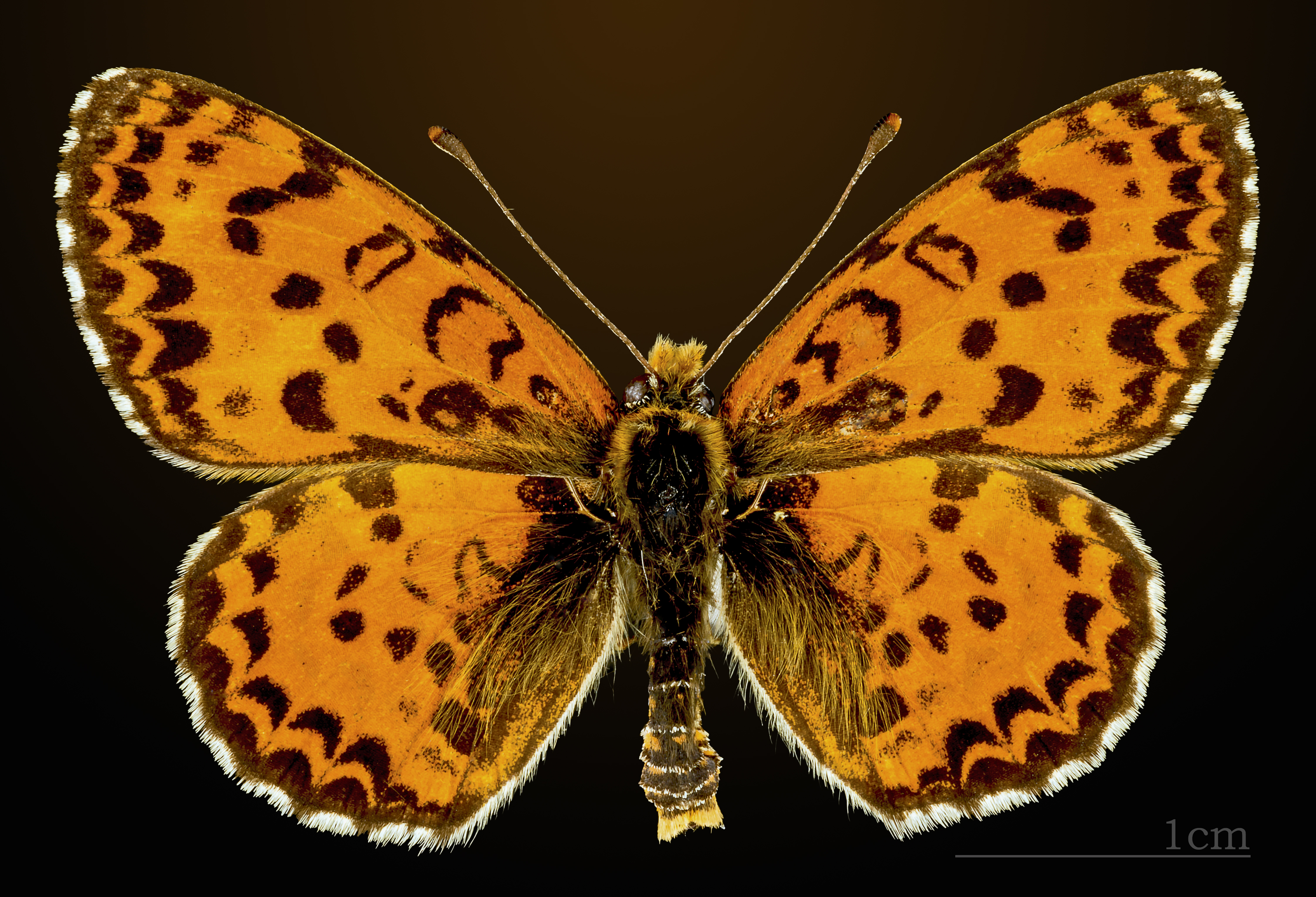
Male

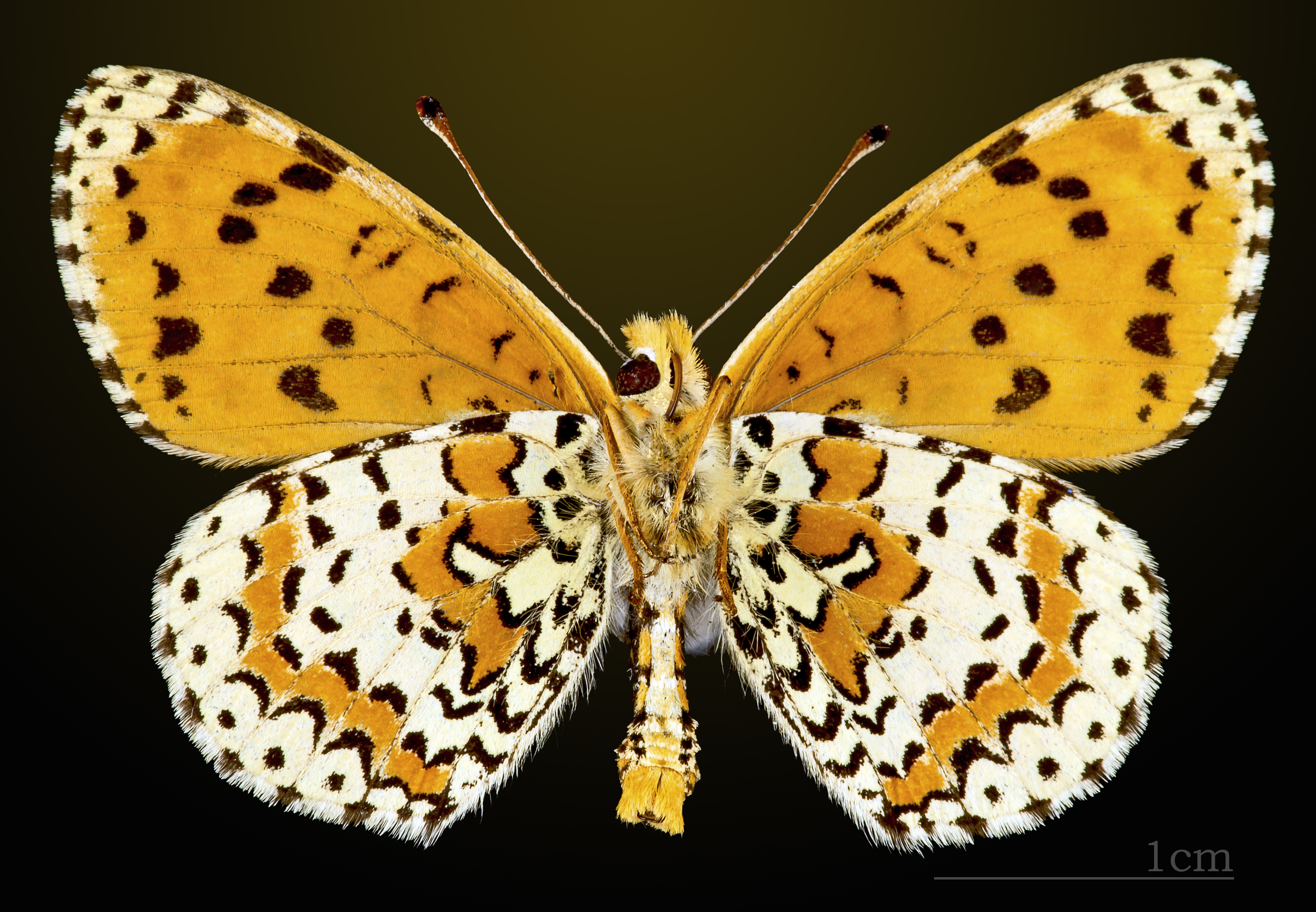
Male underside

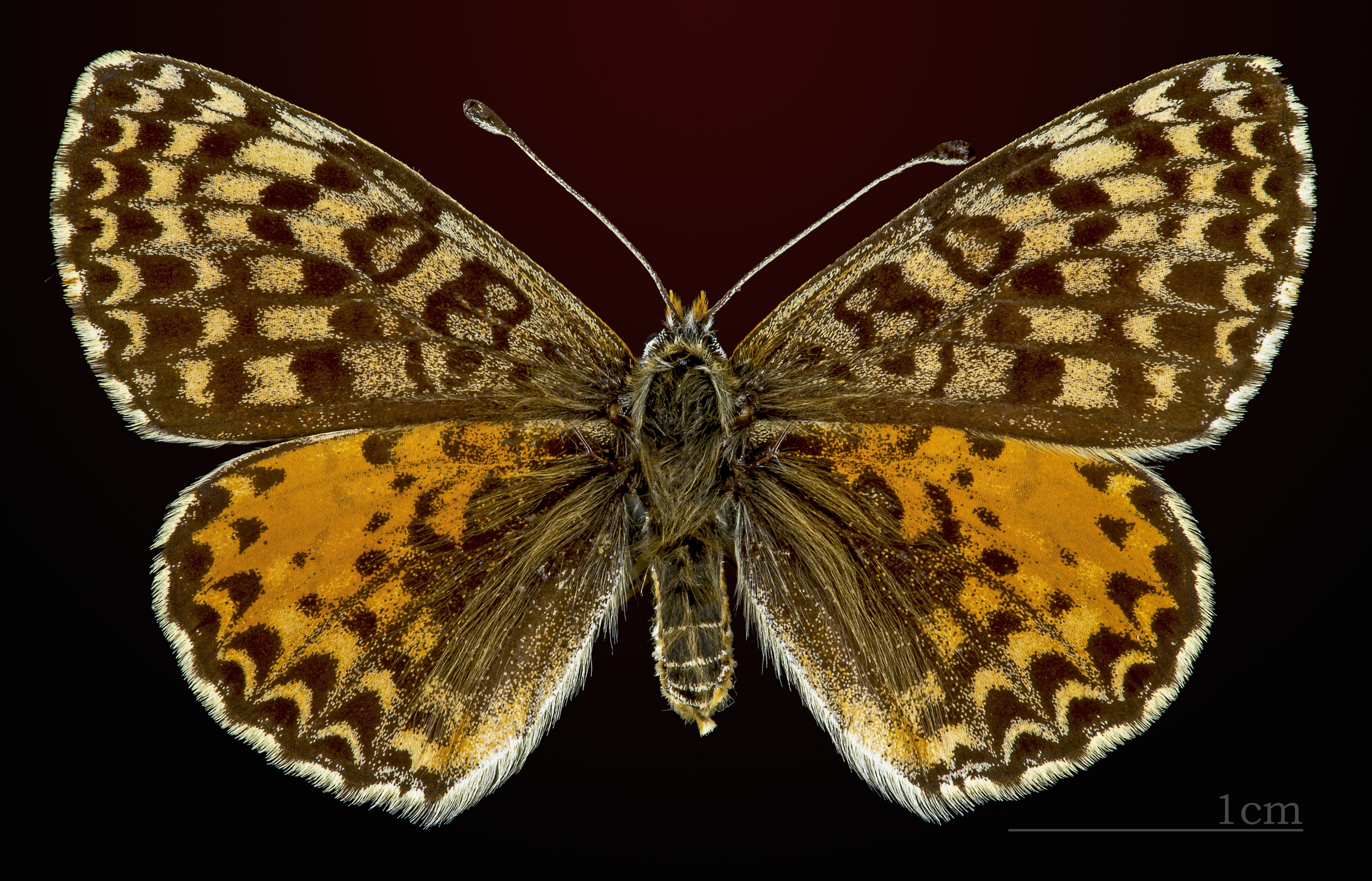
Female

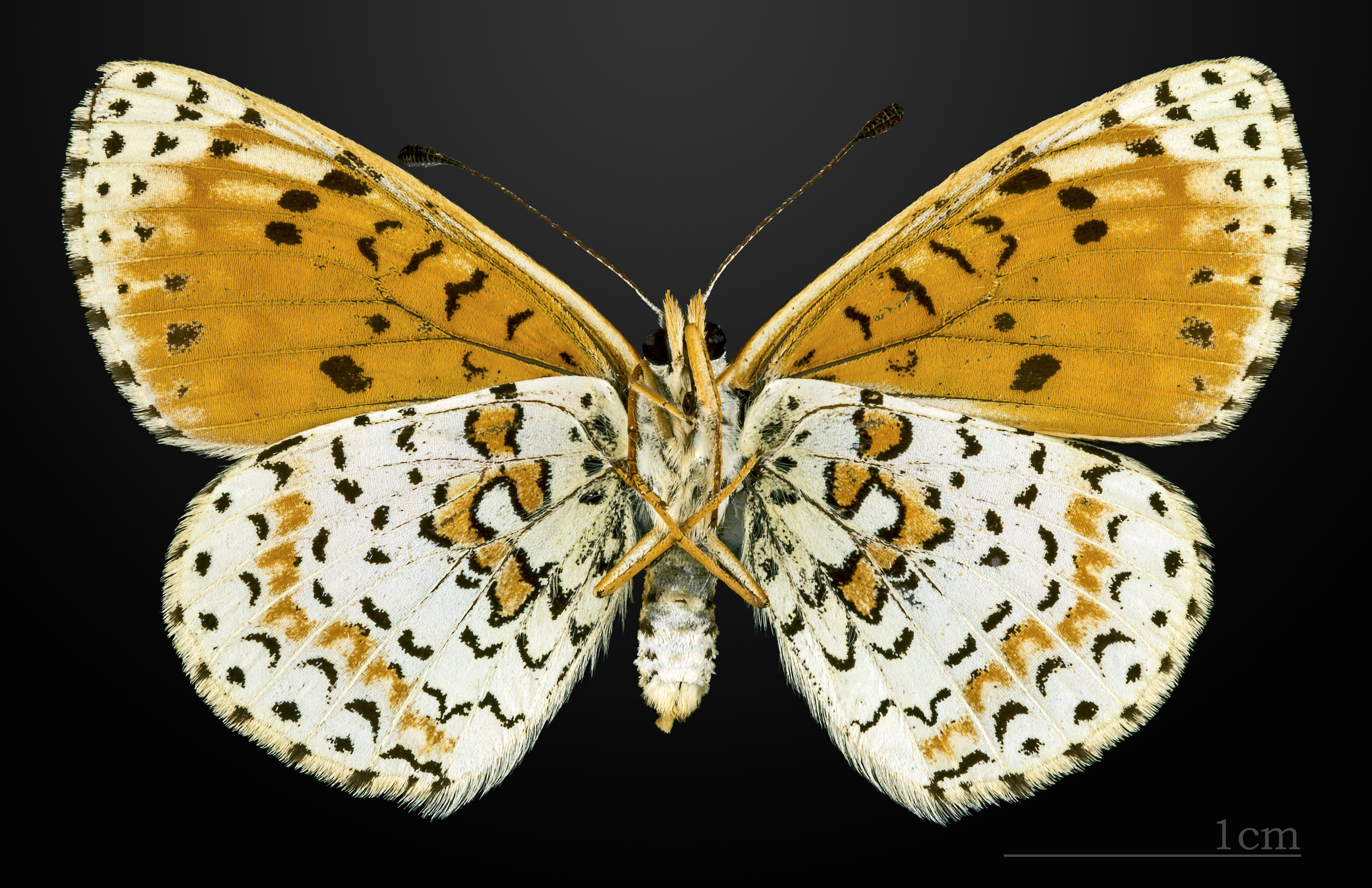
Female underside

== Distribution ==
It is found in southern and central Europe, North Africa, the Middle East, central Asia and Siberia. It is absent from northern Europe (England, Ireland, northern France, Germany, Poland and Scandinavia).

== Habitat ==
Melitaea didyma prefers flowery and grassy areas, meadows and roadsides.

== Subspecies ==
The species has been divided into many putative subspecies or named forms, some of which are:

- Melitaea didyma ambra Higgings, 1941
- Melitaea didyma didyma (Esper, 1778)
- Melitaea didyma elavar Fruhstorfer, 1917
- Melitaea didyma kirgisica Bryk, 1940
- Melitaea didyma meridionalis Staudinger, 1870
- Melitaea didyma neera Fischer de Waldheim, 1840
- Melitaea didyma occidentalis Staudinger, 1861
- Melitaea didyma orientalis Herrich-Schäffer, 1856
- Melitaea didyma turkestanica Sheljuzhko, 1929

etc.

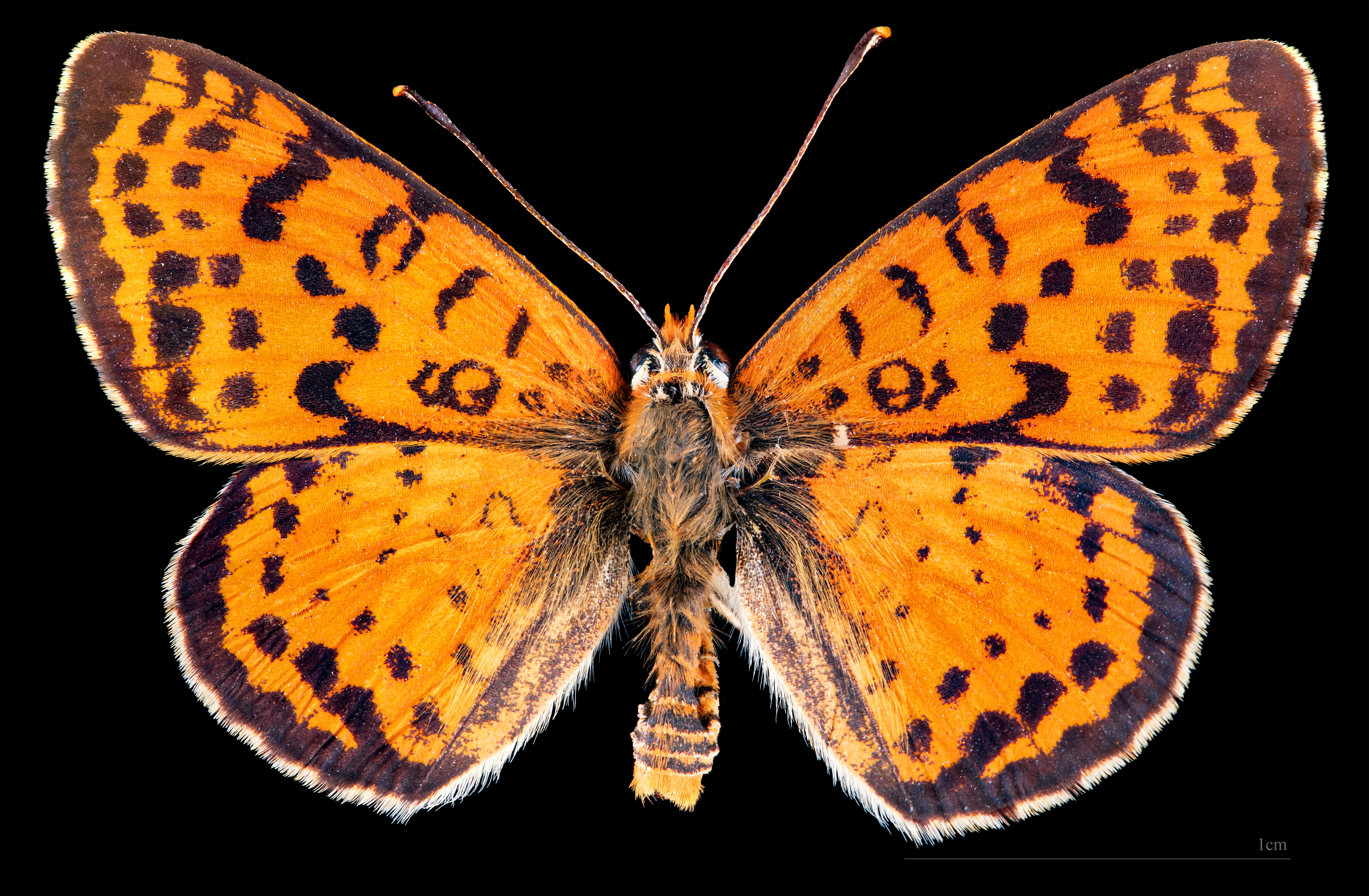
Melitaea didyma occidentalis ♂

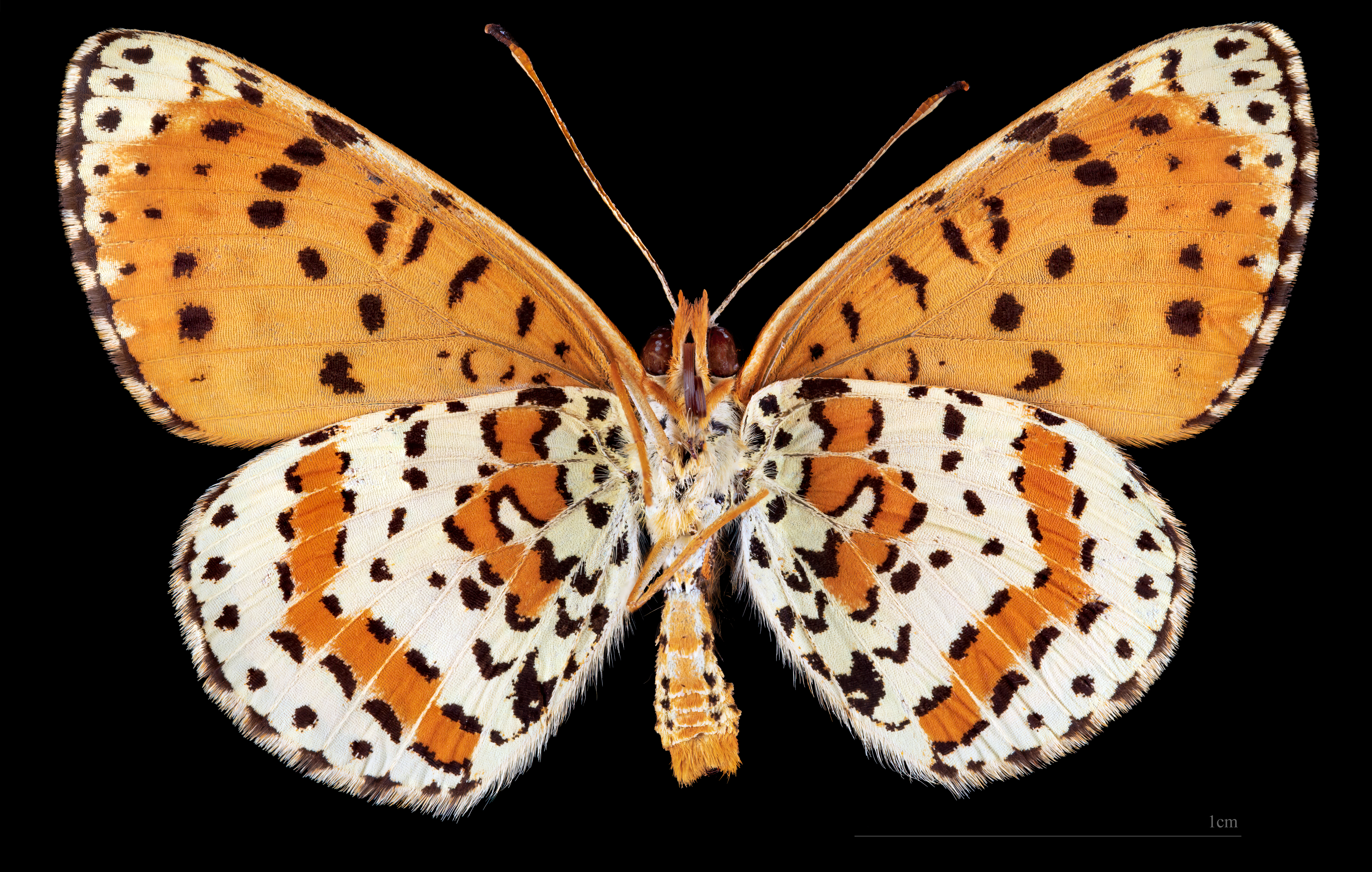
Melitaea didyma occidentalis ♂ △

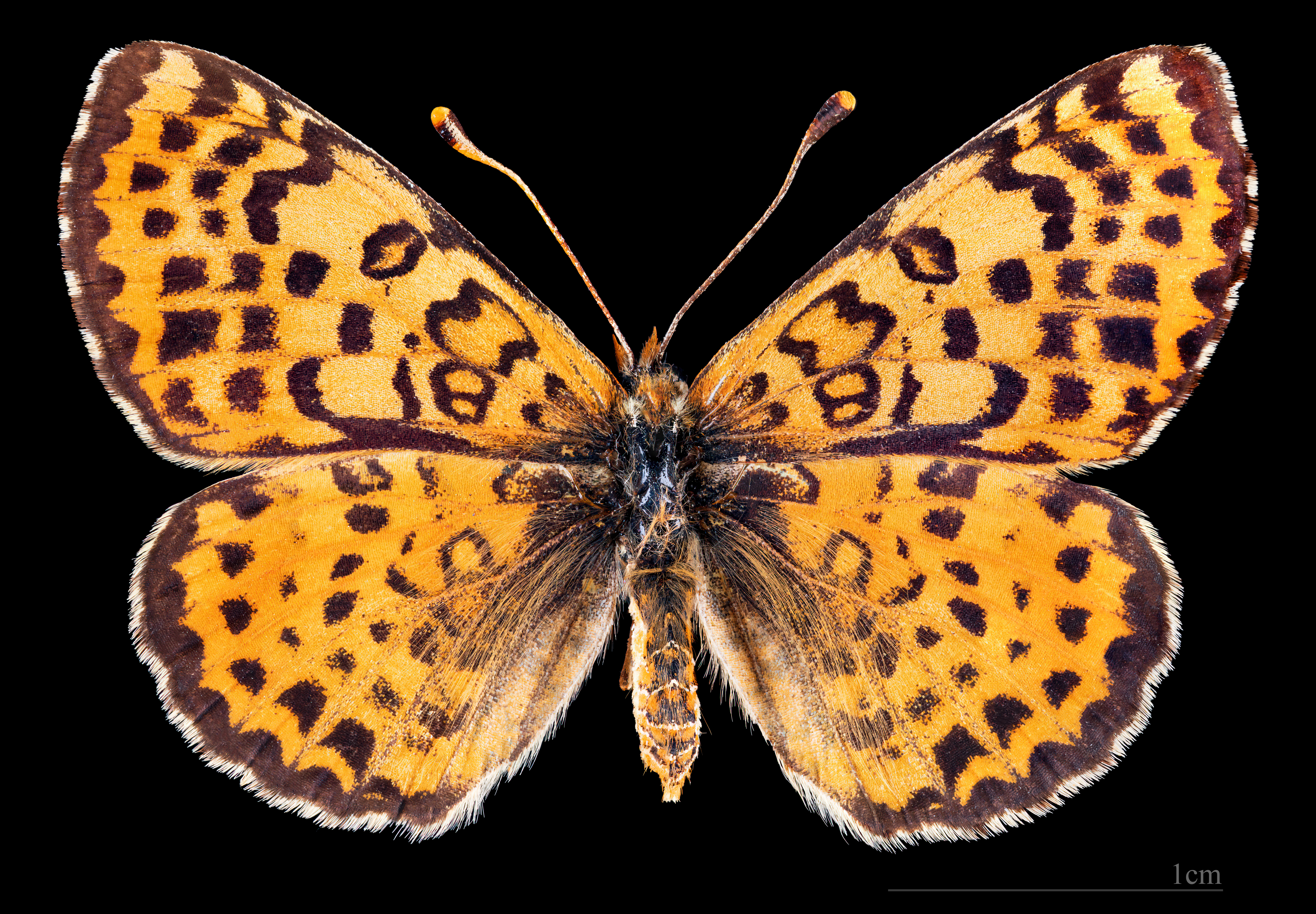
Melitaea didyma occidentalis ♀

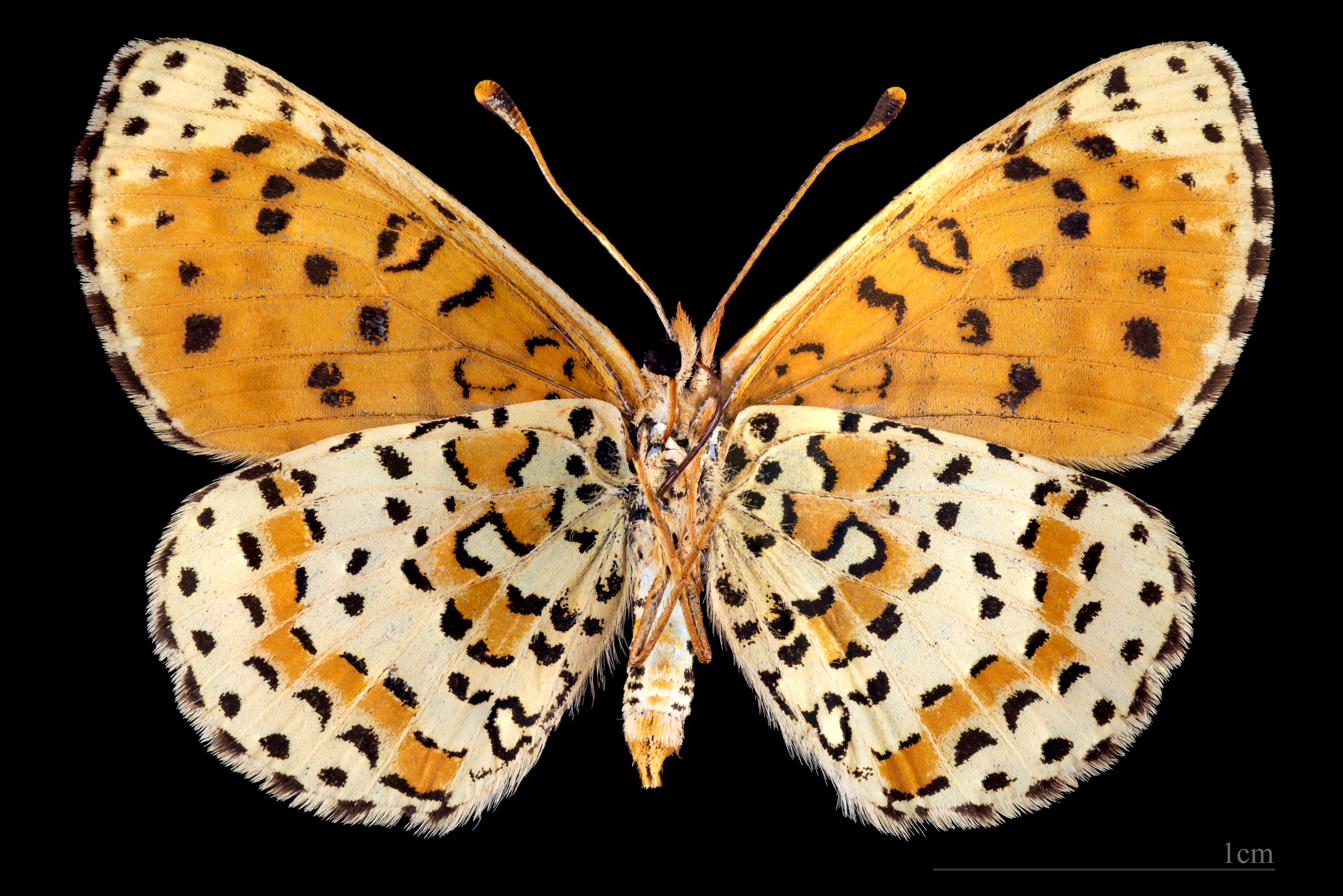
Melitaea didyma occidentalis ♀ △

== Images of life cycle ==
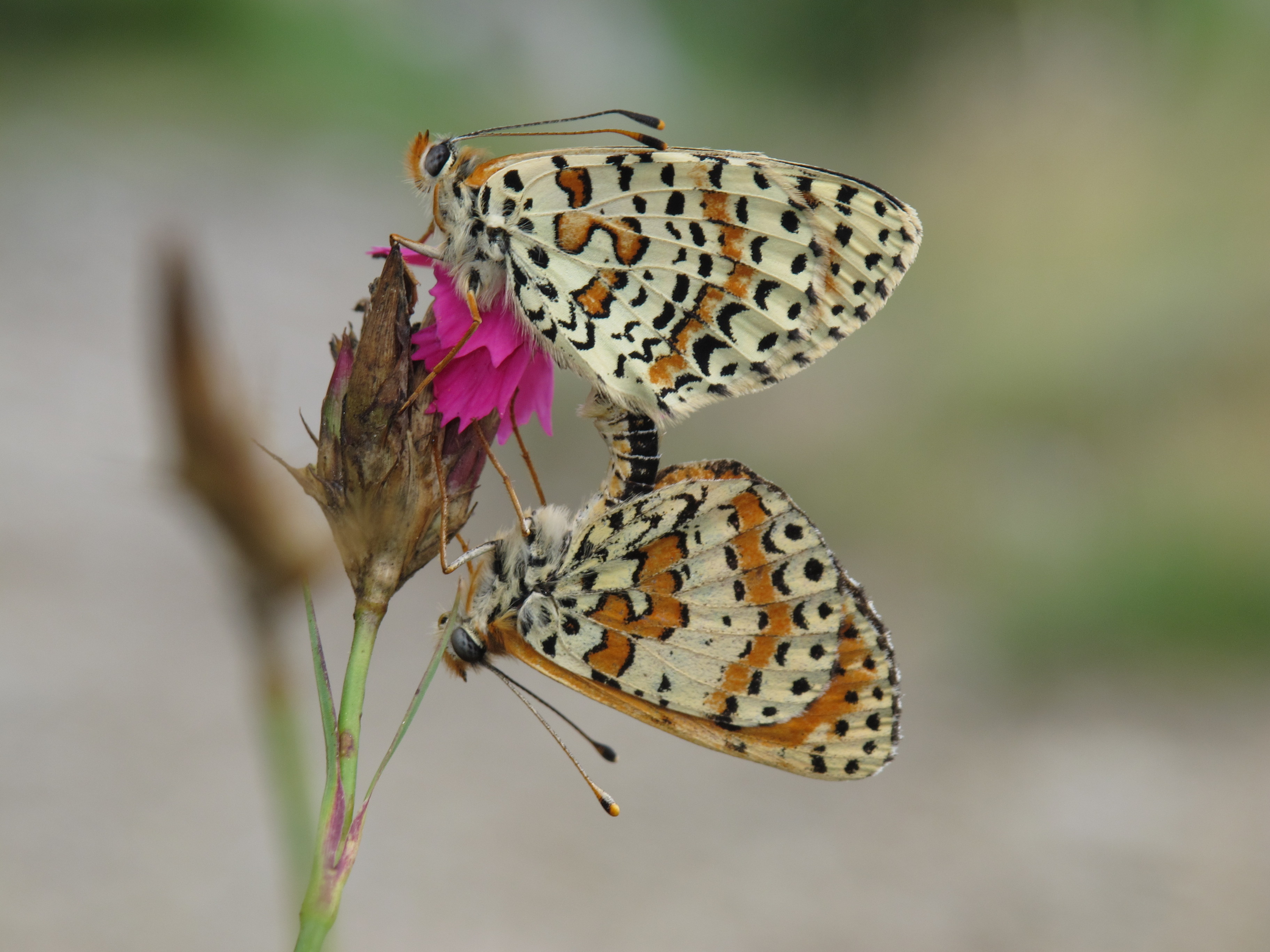
Mating

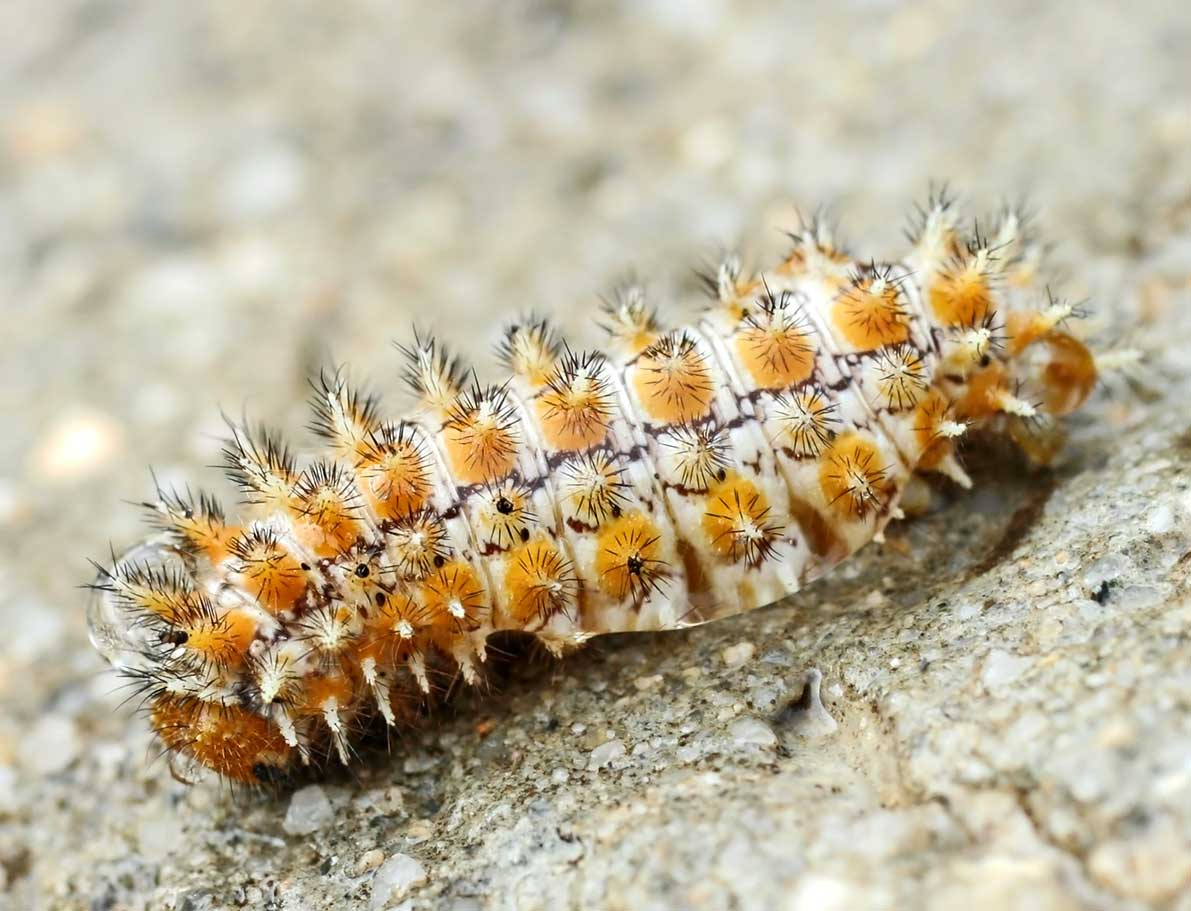
Larva (or caterpillar)

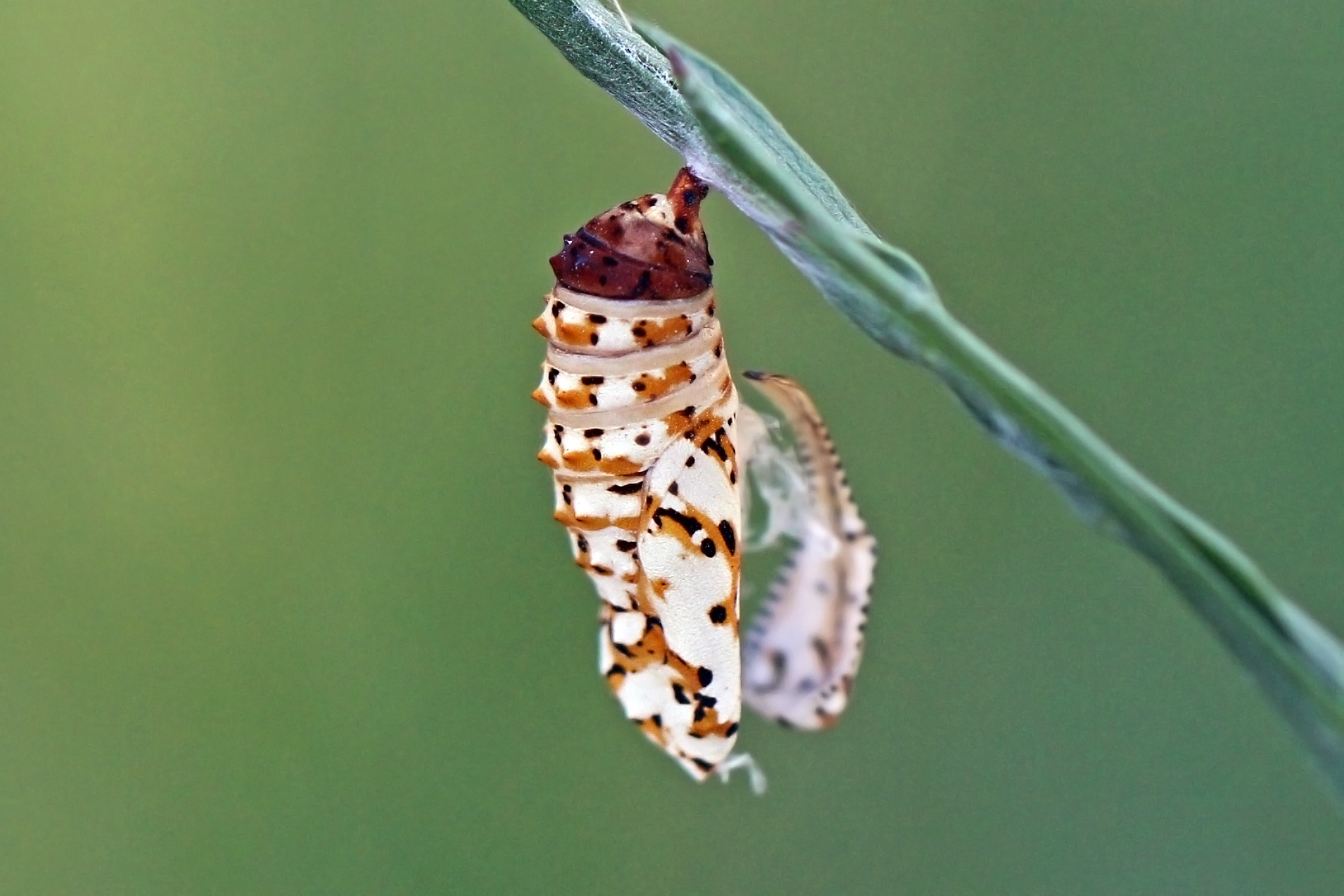
Pupa (or chrysalis)
