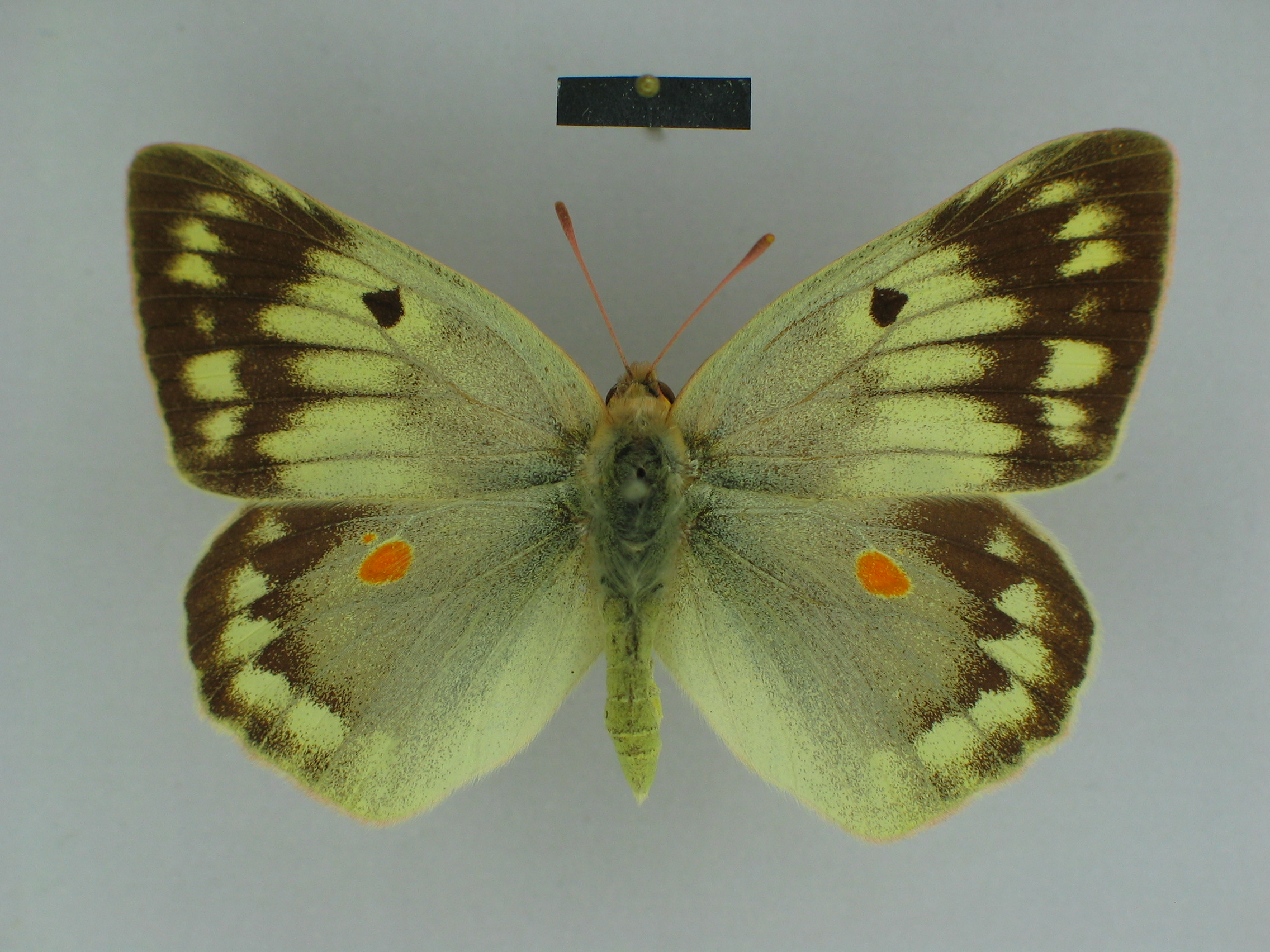
- female. dorsal side; scalebar=1 cm

Scientific classification
- Kingdom: Animalia
- Phylum: Arthropoda
- Clade: Pancrustacea
- Class: Insecta
- Order: Lepidoptera
- Family: Pieridae
- Genus: Colias
- Species: C. sagartia

Binomial name
- Colias sagartia Lederer, 1869

Synonyms
- Colias daubii Geest, 1905; Colias lisa Geest, 1905; Colias pullata Neuburger, 1905

= Colias sagartia =

Species of butterfly

Colias sagartia is a butterfly of the family Pieridae. It is found in the Elburz mountains in northern Iran and the mountains of north-western Iran.

The wingspan is 48–54 mm. Adults are on wing from June to July in one generation per year.

The larvae feed on Acantholimon and Astragalus species.

== Gallery ==
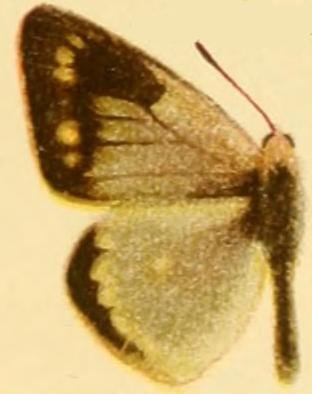
Male

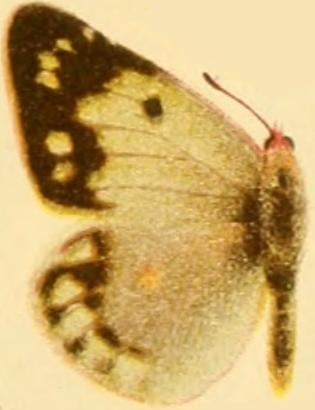
Female

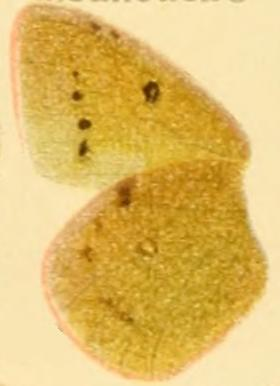
Underside of the wings
