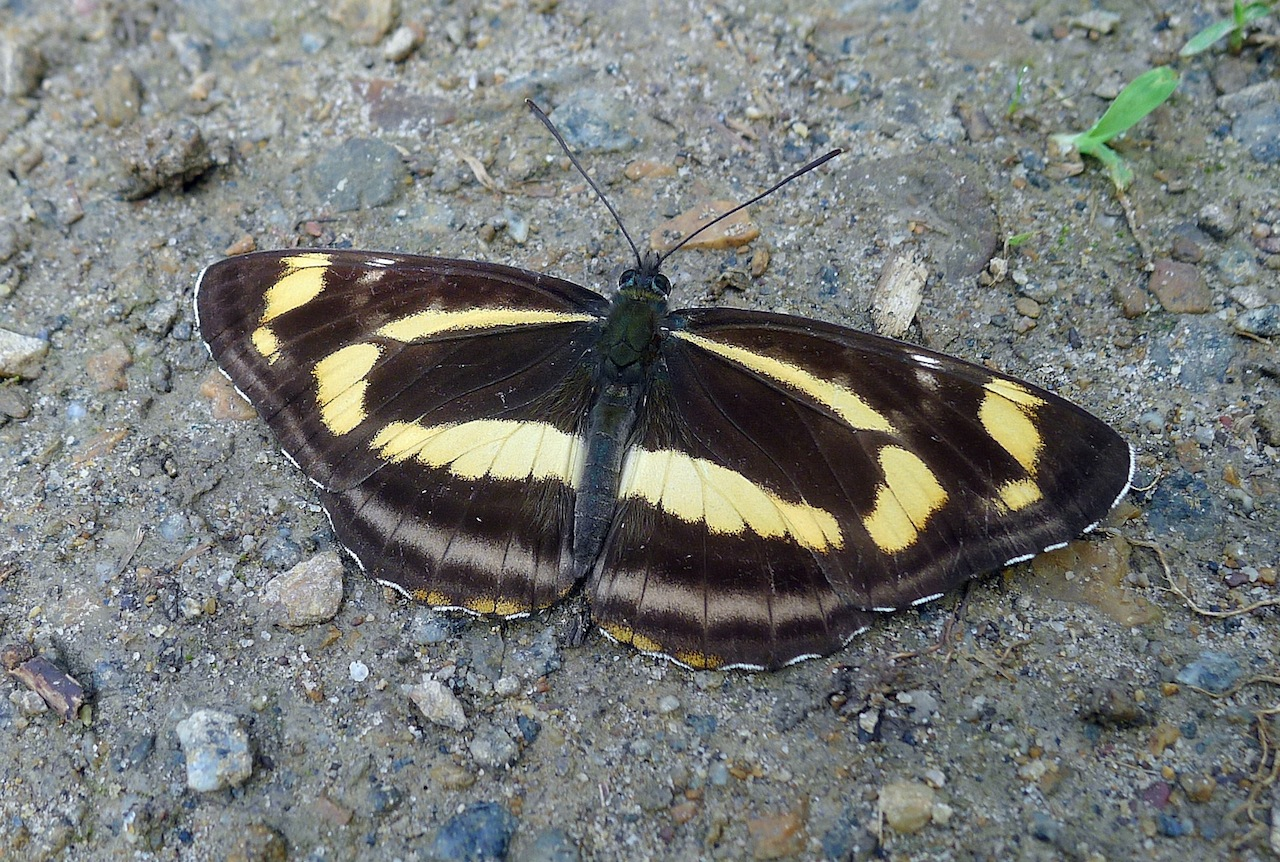

Scientific classification
- Domain: Eukaryota
- Kingdom: Animalia
- Phylum: Arthropoda
- Class: Insecta
- Order: Lepidoptera
- Family: Nymphalidae
- Genus: Aldania
- Species: A. thisbe

Binomial name
- Aldania thisbe (Ménétries, 1859)

Synonyms
- Neptis thisbe Ménétries, 1859; Aldania ussuriensis Kurentzov, 1970

= Aldania thisbe =

Species of butterfly

Aldania thisbe is a butterfly in the family Nymphalidae. It is found in the Amur and Ussuri regions of Russia, central and north-eastern China and Korea. The habitat consists of open landscapes and forest canopy in broadleaved or mixed forests with a mixture of oak.

Adults are on wing from June to July.

The larvae feed on Quercus mongolica.

== Subspecies ==
- Aldania thisbe thisbe
- Aldania thisbe obscurior (Oberthür, 1906)
- Aldania thisbe dilutior (Oberthür, 1906)
