= List of butterflies of Europe (Lycaenidae) =

This is a list of the Lycaenidae of Europe. It is a part of List of the butterflies of Europe.

== Subfamily Aphnaeinae ==
- Tawny silverline, Cigaritis acamas (Klug, 1834)

== Subfamily Lycaeninae ==
Tribe Lycaenini

- Small copper, Lycaena phlaeas (Linnaeus, 1761)
- Large copper, Lycaena dispar (Haworth, 1802)
- Violet copper Lycaena helle Denis & Schiffermüller, 1775
- Lycaena ottomanus (Lefèbvre, 1830)
- Scarce copper, Lycaena virgaureae (Linnaeus, 1758)
- Sooty copper, Lycaena tityrus (Poda, 1761)
- Iberian sooty copper, Lycaena bleusei Oberthur, 1884
- Purple-shot copper, Lycaena alciphron (Rottemburg, 1775)
- Purple-edged copper, Lycaena hippothoe (Linnaeus, 1761)
- Balkan copper, Lycaena candens (Herrich-Schäffer, [1844])
- Lesser fiery copper, Lycaena thersamon (Esper, 1784)
- Golden copper, Lycaena thetis Klug 1834

== Subfamily Polyommatinae ==
Tribe Polyommatini

- Nordic blue, Agriades aquilo (Boisduval, 1832)
- Bosnian blue, Agriades dardanus (Freyer, 1844)
- Arctic blue, Agriades glandon (de Prunner, 1798)
- Cranberry blue, Agriades optilete (Knoch, 1781)
- Alpine argus, Agriades orbitulus (de Prunner, 1798)
- Gavarnie blue, Agriades pyrenaicus (Boisduval, 1840)
- Zullich's blue, Agriades zullichi
- Brown argus, Aricia agestis (Denis & Schiffermuller 1775)
- Blue argus, Aricia anteros (Freyer, 1838)
- Northern brown argus, Aricia artaxerxes (Fabricius, 1793)
- Southern brown argus, Aricia cramera Eschscholtz, 1821
- Mountain argus, Aricia montensis Verity, 1928
- Spanish argus, Aricia morronensis (Ribbe, 1910)
- Silvery argus, Aricia nicias (Meigen, 1830)
- Topaz-spotted blue, Azanus jesous (Guérin-Méneville, 1847)
- Velvet-spotted blue, Azanus ubaldus (Stoll, 1782)
- Geranium bronze, Cacyreus marshalli Butler, 1898
- Holly blue, Celastrina argiolus (Linnaeus, 1758)
- Provençal short-tailed blue, Cupido alcetas (Hoffmansegg, 1804)
- Short-tailed blue, Cupido argiades (Pallas, 1771)
- Eastern short-tailed blue, Cupido decolorata (Staudinger, 1886)
- Lorquin's blue, Cupido lorquinii (Herrich-Schäffer, 1847)
- Small blue, Cupido minimus (Fuessly, 1775)
- Osiris blue, Cupido osiris (Meigen, 1829)
- Carswell's little blue, Cupido carswelli Stempffer, 1927
- Mazarine blue, Cyaniris semiargus (Rottemburg, 1775)
- Geranium argus, Eumedonia eumedon (Esper 1780)
- Grass jewel, Freyeria trochylus (Freyer, 1845)
- Glabroculus cyane (Eversmann, 1837)
- Green-underside blue, Glaucopsyche alexis (Poda, 1761)
- Black-eyed blue, Glaucopsyche melanops (Boisduval, 1828)
- Paphos blue, Glaucopsyche paphos Chapman, 1920
- Iolas blue, Iolana iolas (Ochsenheimer, 1816)
- Eastern brown argus, Kretania eurypilus (Freyer, 1851)
- Spanish zephyr blue, Kretania hesperica (Rambur, 1840)
- Cretan argus, Kretania psylorita (Freyer, 1845)
- Zephyr blue, Kretania pylaon (Fischer von Waldheim, 1832)
- Zephyr blue, Kretania sephirus (Frivaldzky, 1835)
- Alpine zephyr blue, Kretania trappi (Verity, 1927)
- Long-tailed blue, Lampides boeticus (Linnaeus, 1767)
- Lang's short-tailed blue, Leptotes pirithous (Linnaeus, 1767)
- Canary blue, Leptotes webbianus (Brullé, 1839)
- Persian grass blue, Luthrodes galba (Lederer, 1855)
- Spanish chalk-hill blue, Lysandra albicans (Gerhard, 1851)
- Adonis blue, Lysandra bellargus (Rottemburg, 1775)
- Azure chalkhill blue, Lysandra caelestissima (Vérity, 1921)
- Chalkhill blue, Lysandra coridon (Poda, 1761)
- False chalkhill blue, Lysandra corydonius (Herrich-Schäffer, 1852)
- Lysandra gennargenti Leigheb, 1987
- Provence chalk-hill blue, Lysandra hispana (Herrich-Schäffer, 1852)
- Lysandra nufrellensis Schurian, 1977
- Pontic blue, Neolysandra coelestina (Eversmann, 1843)
- Alcon blue, Phengaris alcon (Denis & Schiffermüller, 1775)
- Large blue, Phengaris arion (Linnaeus, 1758)
- Dusky large blue, Phengaris nausithous (Bergsträsser, 1779)
- Scarce large blue, Phengaris teleius (Bergsträsser, 1779)
- Large jewel blue, Plebejidea loewii (Zeller, 1847)
- Silver-studded blue, Plebejus argus (Linnaeus, 1758)
- Reverdin's blue, Plebejus argyrognomon (Bergsträsser, 1779)
- Bellier's Blue, Plebejus bellieri (Oberthür, 1910)
- Idas blue, Plebejus idas (Linnaeus, 1761)
- Anomalous blue, Polyommatus admetus (Esper, 1783)
- Amanda's blue, Polyommatus amandus (Schneider, 1792)
- Grecian anomalous blue, Polyommatus aroaniensis (Brown, 1976)
- Polyommatus celina (Austaut, 1879)
- Polyommatus damocles (Herrich-Schäffer, 1844) European Russia
- Damon blue, Polyommatus damon (Denis & Schiffermüller, 1775)
- Polyommatus damone (Eversmann, 1841) Ukraine, Russia
- Meleager's blue, Polyommatus daphnis (Denis & Schiffermüller, 1775)
- Furry blue, Polyommatus dolus (Hübner, 1823)
- Turquoise blue, Polyommatus dorylas (Denis & Schiffermüller, 1775)
- Eros blue, Polyommatus eros (Ochsenheimer, 1808)
- Escher's blue, Polyommatus escheri (Hübner, 1823)
- Oberthür’s anomalous blue, Polyommatus fabressei (Oberthür, 1910)
- Catalonian furry blue, Polyommatus fulgens (De Sagarra, 1925)
- Sierra Nevada blue, Polyommatus golgus (Hübner, 1813)
- Piedmont anomalous blue, Polyommatus humedasae Toso & Balletto, 1976
- Common blue, Polyommatus icarus (Rottemburg, 1775)
- Chelmos blue, Polyommatus iphigenia (Herrich-Schäffer, 1847)
- Anatolian white-blue, Polyommatus menalcas (Freyer, 1837)
- Higgins’s anomalous blue, Polyommatus nephohiptamenos (Brown & Coutsis, 1978)
- Mother-of-pearl blue, Polyommatus nivescens Keferstein, 1851
- Kolev's anomalous blue, Polyommatus orphicus Kolev, 2005
- Ripart's anomalous blue, Polyommatus ripartii (Freyer, 1830)
- Chapman's blue, Polyommatus thersites (Cantener, 1835)
- Polyommatus timfristos Lukhtanov, Vishnevskaya & Shapoval, 2016
- Andalusian anomalous blue, Polyommatus violetae (Gómez-Bustillo, Expósito & Martínez, 1979)
- Sardinian blue, Pseudophilotes barbagiae De Prins & van der Poorten, 1982
- False baton blue, Pseudophilotes abencerragus (Pierret, 1837)
- Baton blue, Pseudophilotes baton (Bergsträsser, 1779)
- Bavius blue, Pseudophilotes bavius (Eversmann, 1832)
- Panoptes blue, Pseudophilotes panoptes (Hübner, 1813)
- Eastern baton blue, Pseudophilotes vicrama (Moore, 1865)
- Chequered blue, Scolitantides orion (Pallas, 1771)
- Balkan Pierrot, Tarucus balkanica (Freyer, 1844)
- Common tiger blue, Tarucus theophrastus (Fabricius, 1793)
- Fischer's blue, Tongeia fischeri (Eversmann, 1843)
- Turanana taygetica (Rebel, 1902)
- Dark grass blue, Zizeeria karsandra (Moore, 1865)
- African grass blue, Zizeeria knysna (Trimen, 1862)

== Subfamily Theclinae ==
Tribe Eumaeini

- Chapman's green hairstreak, Callophrys avis Chapman, 1909
- Sovinsky's green hairstreak, Callophrys chalybeitincta , Sovinsky, 1905 Russia
- Alpine green hairstreak, Callophrys suaveola (Staudinger, 1881) Russia
- Green hairstreak, Callophrys rubi (Linnaeus, 1758)
- Neolycaena rhymnus (Eversmann, 1832)
- Sloe hairstreak, Satyrium acaciae (Fabricius, 1787)
- False ilex hairstreak, Satyrium esculi (Hübner, 1804)
- Ilex hairstreak, Satyrium ilicis (Esper, 1779)
- Satyrium ledereri (Boisduval, 1848)
- Black hairstreak, Satyrium pruni (Linnaeus, 1758)
- Blue spot hairstreak, Satyrium spini (Denis & Schiffermuller, 1775)
- White-letter hairstreak, Satyrium w-album (Knoch, 1782)

Tribe Theclini

- Purple hairstreak, Favonius quercus (Linnaeus, 1758)
- Spanish purple hairstreak, Laeosopis roboris (Esper, 1789)
- Brown hairstreak, Thecla betulae (Linnaeus, 1758)

Tribe Tomarini

- Provence hairstreak, Tomares ballus Fabricius, 1787
- Caucasian vernal copper, Tomares callimachus (Eversmann, 1848)
- Nogel's hairstreak, Tomares nogelii (Herrich-Schäffer, 1851)
