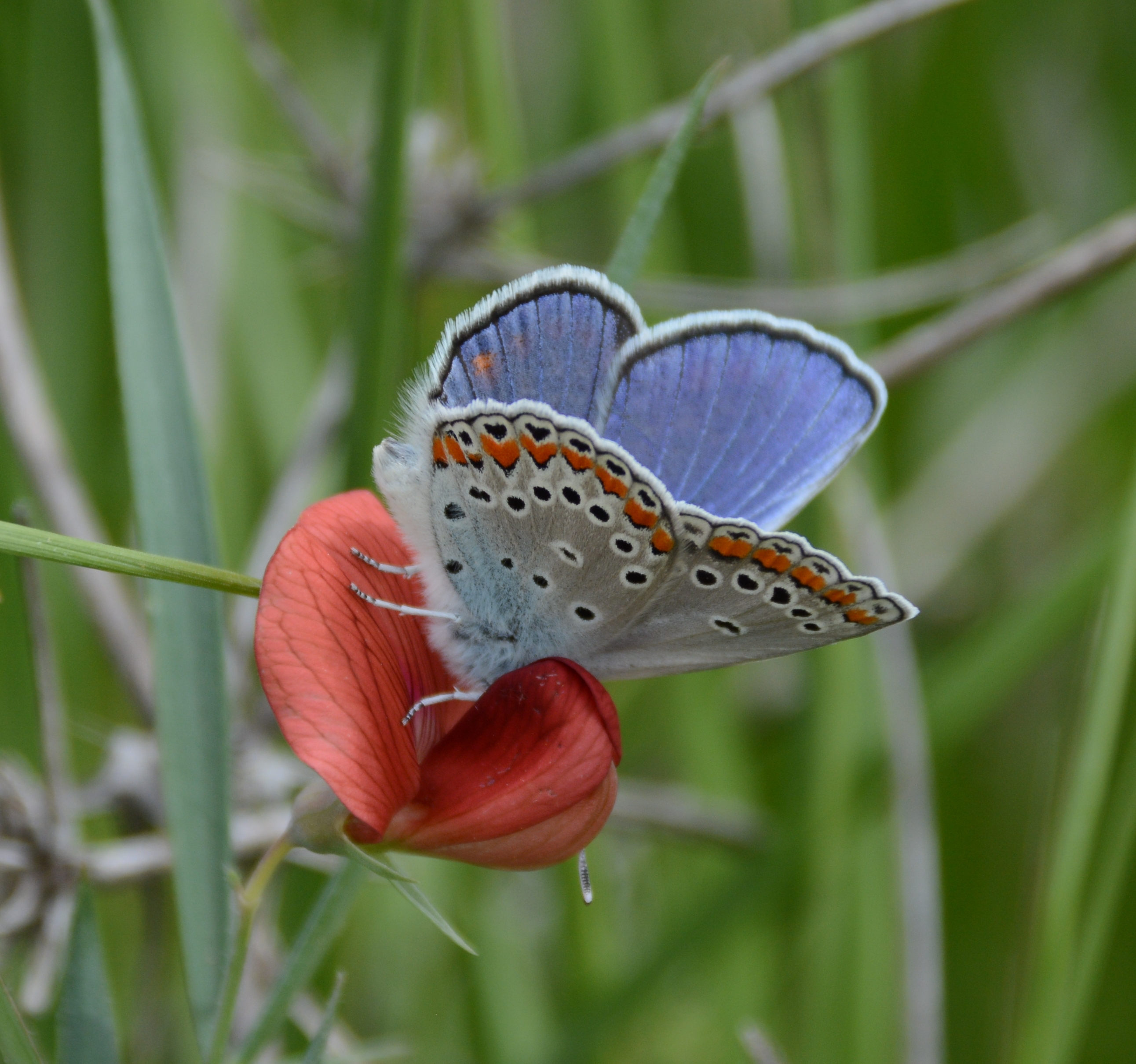
- A male of Kretania pylaon cleopatra.

Scientific classification
- Kingdom: Animalia
- Phylum: Arthropoda
- Class: Insecta
- Order: Lepidoptera
- Family: Lycaenidae
- Genus: Kretania
- Species: K. pylaon

Binomial name
- Kretania pylaon (Fischer von Waldheim, 1832)

Synonyms
- Lycaena pylaon Fischer von Waldheim, 1832; Plebejus pylaon; Plebejides pylaon; Polyommatus (Albulina) pylaon

= Kretania pylaon =

Zephyr blue

Species of butterfly

Kretania pylaon, the zephyr blue, is a butterfly in the family Lycaenidae. It is found in southern Russia and the Middle East to Iran. The habitat consists of dry habitats.

This species was considered to encompass a lot of subspecies across Europe and Asia, several of which are now generally viewed as distinct species, such as Kretania hesperica (Spain), K. trappi (Alps), K. sephirus (Eastern Europe, Caucasus, Asia Minor), K. zephyrinus (Caucasus, Central Asia), K. nicholli (Levant), and K. philbyi (Levant).

The wingspan is 28–34 mm. Adults are on wing from May to July.

The larvae feed on Astragalus species, including Astragalus exscapus, Astragalus dasyanthus, Astragalus parnassi cyllenus, Astragalus angustifolius and Astragalus creticus rumelicus. They are attended by ants of the Bothriomyrmex, Tapinoma, Lasius, Camponotus, Tetramorium and Formica genera.

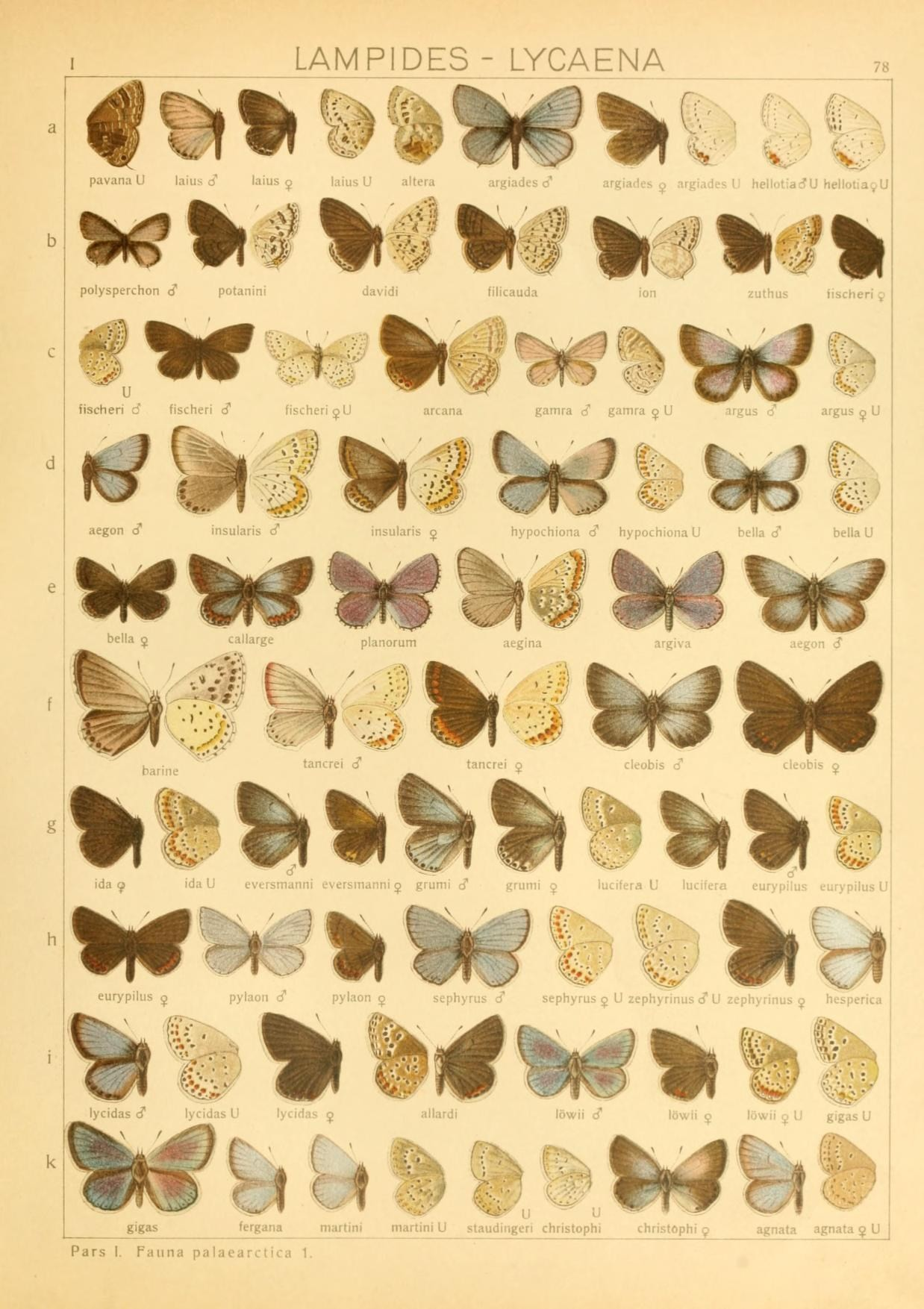
Seitz 78h

== Description from Seitz ==
L. pylaon Fisch.-Waldh. (= zephyrus H.-Sch., cyane Ev.) (78 h). The male of this small Blue recalls by the peculiar violet sheen of the upperside the form planorum of argyrognomon. Beneath snowy white, the hindwing with a strong sky-blue sheen and the distal band composed of vivid golden red, strongly glossy spots. — From the Ural, South Russia and the Kirghiz steppes, in May, not rare.

== Subspecies ==
- Kretania pylaon pylaon
- Kretania pylaon cleopatra Hemming, 1934
- Kretania pylaon solimana (Forster, 1938)
- Kretania pylaon katunensis (Bálint & Lukhtanov, 1990)
- Kretania pylaon tadjikus Tschikolovetz

== Etymology ==
Named in the Classical tradition . Pylaon in Greek mythology is one of the twelve sons of Neleus and Chloris, who died at the hands of Hercules.

== Other ==
There is an official color called zephyr blue, which bears considerable resemblance to the color scheme of Kretania pylaon.
