= Neolycaena rhymnus =

- Neolycaena rhymnus in Seitz

Scientific classification
- Kingdom: Animalia
- Phylum: Arthropoda
- Clade: Pancrustacea
- Class: Insecta
- Order: Lepidoptera
- Family: Lycaenidae
- Genus: Neolycaena
- Species: N. rhymnus

Binomial name
- Neolycaena rhymnus (Eversmann, 1832)

Synonyms
- Lycaena rhymnus Eversmann, 1832; Neolycaena betpakdalensis Zhdanko, 1998; Neolycaena rufina Lukhtanov, 1994

Species of butterfly

Neolycaena rhymnus is a butterfly of the family Lycaenidae. It is found from Ukraine and southern and central Russia to the southern Ural Mountains, Zauralye, the western and southern Altai Region, the Sayan Mountains and Kazakhstan. Seitz gives this description - T. rhymnus Ev. (73 f). Tailless, the wings brown above and beneath. The underside irrorated with numerous white short dashes, which are partly placed in rows and partly irregularly dispersed. — In South Russia, South Siberia to the Altai, in May and June, on steppes.

Adults are on wing from late May to mid-June. There is one generation per year.

The larvae feed on Caragana frutex.

== Subspecies ==
- Neolycaena rhymnus rhymnus
- Neolycaena rhymnus betpakdalensis (western Kazakhstan)
- Neolycaena rhymnus rufina (Katutau Mountains, Dzhungarsky Alatau, south-eastern Kazakhstan)
