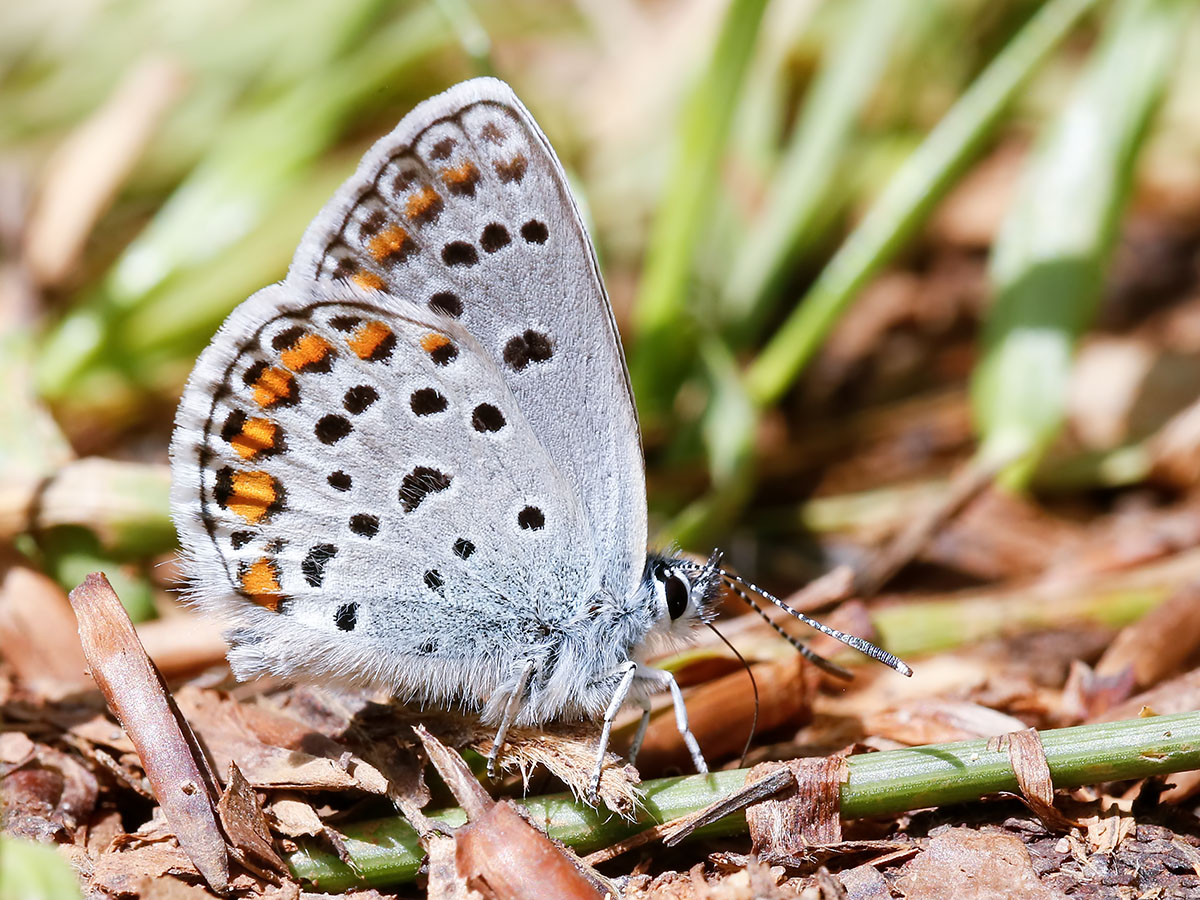
- Kretania sephirus

Scientific classification
- Domain: Eukaryota
- Kingdom: Animalia
- Phylum: Arthropoda
- Class: Insecta
- Order: Lepidoptera
- Family: Lycaenidae
- Subfamily: Polyommatinae
- Tribe: Polyommatini
- Genus: Kretania; Beuret, 1959

Synonyms
- Plebejides Sauter, 1968

= Kretania =

Butterfly genus in the family Lycaenidae

Kretania is a Palearctic genus of butterflies in the family Lycaenidae.

== Species ==
Listed alphabetically within groups:

The eurypilus species-group:

- Kretania csomai (Bálint, 1992)
- Kretania eurypilus (Freyer, 1852) – eastern brown argus
- Kretania iranica (Forster, 1938)
- Kretania psylorita (Freyer, 1845) – Cretan argus
- Kretania zamotajlovi Shchurov & Lukhtanov, 2001

The pylaon species-group:

- Kretania allardii (Oberthür, 1874)
- Kretania beani (Bálint & Johnson, 1997)
- Kretania hesperica (Rambur, 1840)
- Kretania klausrosei (Bálint, 1992)
- Kretania martini (Allard, 1867) – Martin's blue
- Kretania modica (Verity, 1935)
- Kretania nicholli (Elwes, 1901)
- Kretania patriarcha (Bálint, 1992)
- Kretania philbyi (Graves, 1925)
- Kretania pylaon (Fischer de Waldheim, 1832) – zephyr blue
- Kretania sephirus (Frivaldszky, 1835)
- Kretania stekolnikovi Stradomsky & Tikhonov, 2015
- Kretania trappi (Verity, 1927)
- Kretania usbekus (Forster, 1939)
- Kretania zephyrinus (Christoph, 1884)

The alcedo species-group:

- Kretania alcedo (Christoph, 1877)

== Taxonomy ==
Kretania used to be often included in Polyommatus or in Plebejus, but molecular studies have led to reinstate it as a valid genus, now also encompassing species formerly included in Plebejides (i.e. the pylaon species-group), and K. alcedo (formerly in Vacciniina).
