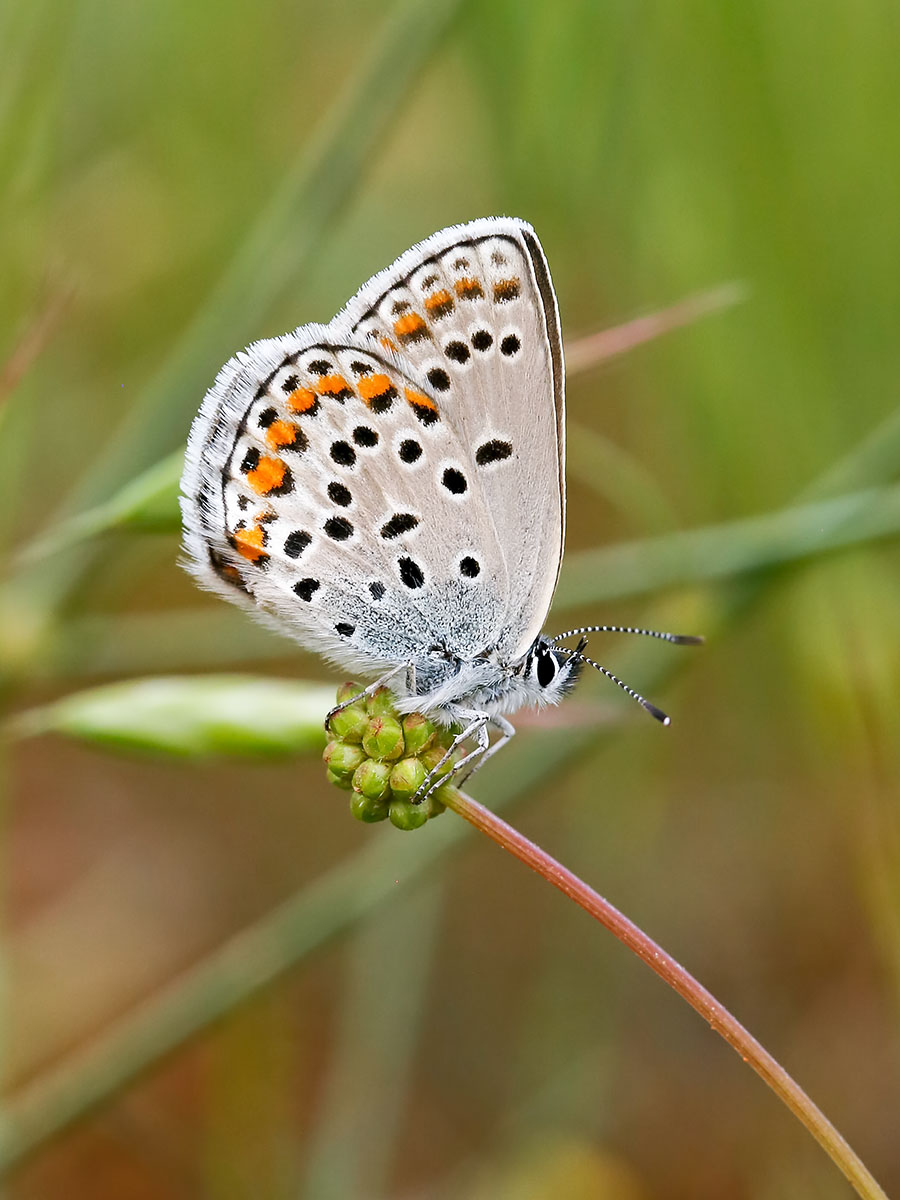
- In Galičica, North Macedonia.

Scientific classification
- Domain: Eukaryota
- Kingdom: Animalia
- Phylum: Arthropoda
- Class: Insecta
- Order: Lepidoptera
- Family: Lycaenidae
- Genus: Kretania
- Species: K. sephirus

Binomial name
- Kretania sephirus (Frivaldszky, 1835)

Synonyms
- Lycaena sephirus Frivaldszky, 1835; Plebejus sephirus; Plebejus pylaon sephirus; Plebejides sephirus

= Kretania sephirus =

Species of butterfly

Kretania sephirus, previously known as Plebejus sephirus, is a species of butterfly that belongs to the family Lycaenidae. It is found in Eastern Europe, the Caucasus, and Asia Minor. The species is part of a species complex, with many members of the complex using variations of the name zephyr blue, including pylaon, trappi, and hesperica. The species, which previously belonged to the genus Plebejus, was moved to the genus Kretania following a 2013 molecular phylogenetics study of the subtribe Polyommatina. Many sephirus populations are threatened, and are legally protected in some countries, such as Hungary.

== Description ==
From Adalbert Seitz's Die Großschmetterlinge des palaearktischen Faunengebietes: L. sephyrus Friv. (78 h). Very similar to [L. pylaon], but almost twice the size, the underside dull grey, the red anal spots not so bright golden-red, but duller red like red lead. From the Balkan Peninsula, Asia Minor, and Armenia.

Larvae primarily feed on Astragalus; larvae of the Hungarian population kovacsi are known to feed mainly on Astragalus exscapus. The myrmecophilous larvae are tended by ants, who collect the exudates that the larvae produce. The ants heap soil and debris at the bases of plants into which the larvae move to pupate.
