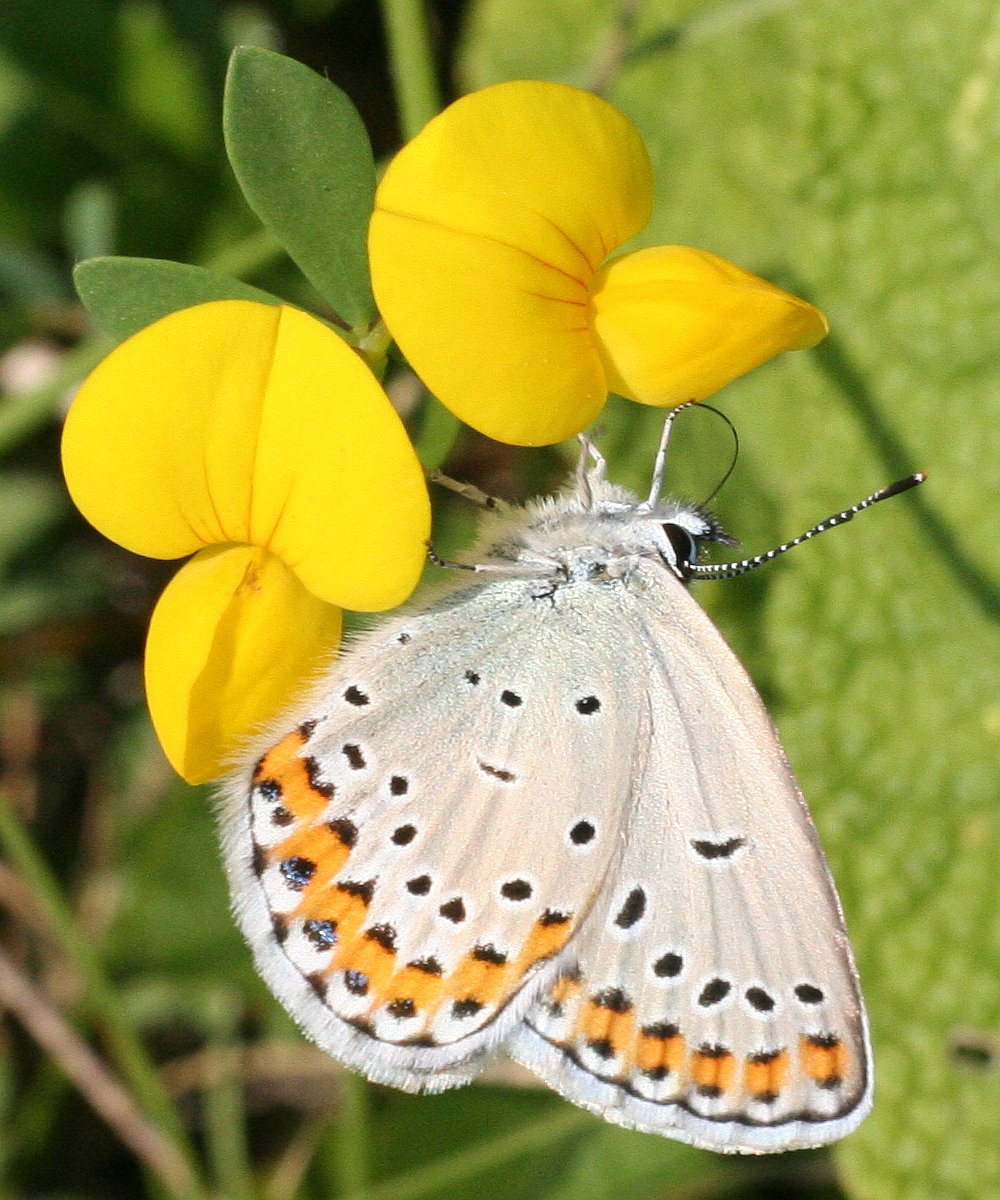
- Female of P. argyrognomon

Scientific classification
- Kingdom: Animalia
- Phylum: Arthropoda
- Clade: Pancrustacea
- Class: Insecta
- Order: Lepidoptera
- Family: Lycaenidae
- Genus: Plebejus
- Species: P. argyrognomon

Binomial name
- Plebejus argyrognomon (Bergsträsser, 1779)

Synonyms
- Plebeius argyrognomon; Polyommatus argyrognomon; Plebejus aegus (Chapman, 1917)

= Plebejus argyrognomon =

Reverdin's blue

Species of butterfly

Plebejus argyrognomon, common name Reverdin's blue is a butterfly of the family Lycaenidae. The species is named after Jacques-Louis Reverdin.

== Subspecies ==
Subspecies include:

- Plebejus argyrognomon anceps Churkin, 2004 – (Mongolia)
- Plebeius argyrognomon argyrognomon Korb & Bolshakov, 2011 – (South Urals, SW. Siberia, Altai Mountains, Prisayanye)
- Plebejus argyrognomon buchara (Forster, 1936) – (Uzbekistan)
- Plebejus argyrognomon caerulescens (Grum-Grshimailo, 1893) – (South Western Siberia)
- Plebejus argyrognomon danapriensis (Stempfer-Schmidt, 1932)
- Plebejus argyrognomon euergetes (Stauder, 1914) – (Western and Southern Europe)
- Plebejus argyrognomon letitia (Hemming, 1934) (Italy)
- Plebejus argyrognomon praeterinsularis (Verity, 1921)

== Distribution ==
This species can be found in Central and Southern Europe, Caucasus, in mountains of Southern Siberia, Mongolia and Amur River. In Japan the species is found in agricultural areas.

== Habitat ==
These butterflies inhabit grassy flowery places at an elevation of 200–1,500 metres (660–4,920 ft) above sea level.

== Description ==
Plebejus argyrognomon has a wingspan of 28–34 mm. These small butterflies present a sexual dimorphism. The upperside of the wings is violet-blue in males, with a narrow, black border and a white fringe, while in the females it is dark brown, with black bordered orange lunules at the outer edge, especially visible on the hindwings. The underside of the wings is light beige in both sexes, with several black spots surrounded by white, an orange stripe and a marginal series of black spots pupillated in silvery blue-green. Caterpillars are pale green with orange brown longitudinal stripes, up to 20 millimeters long.

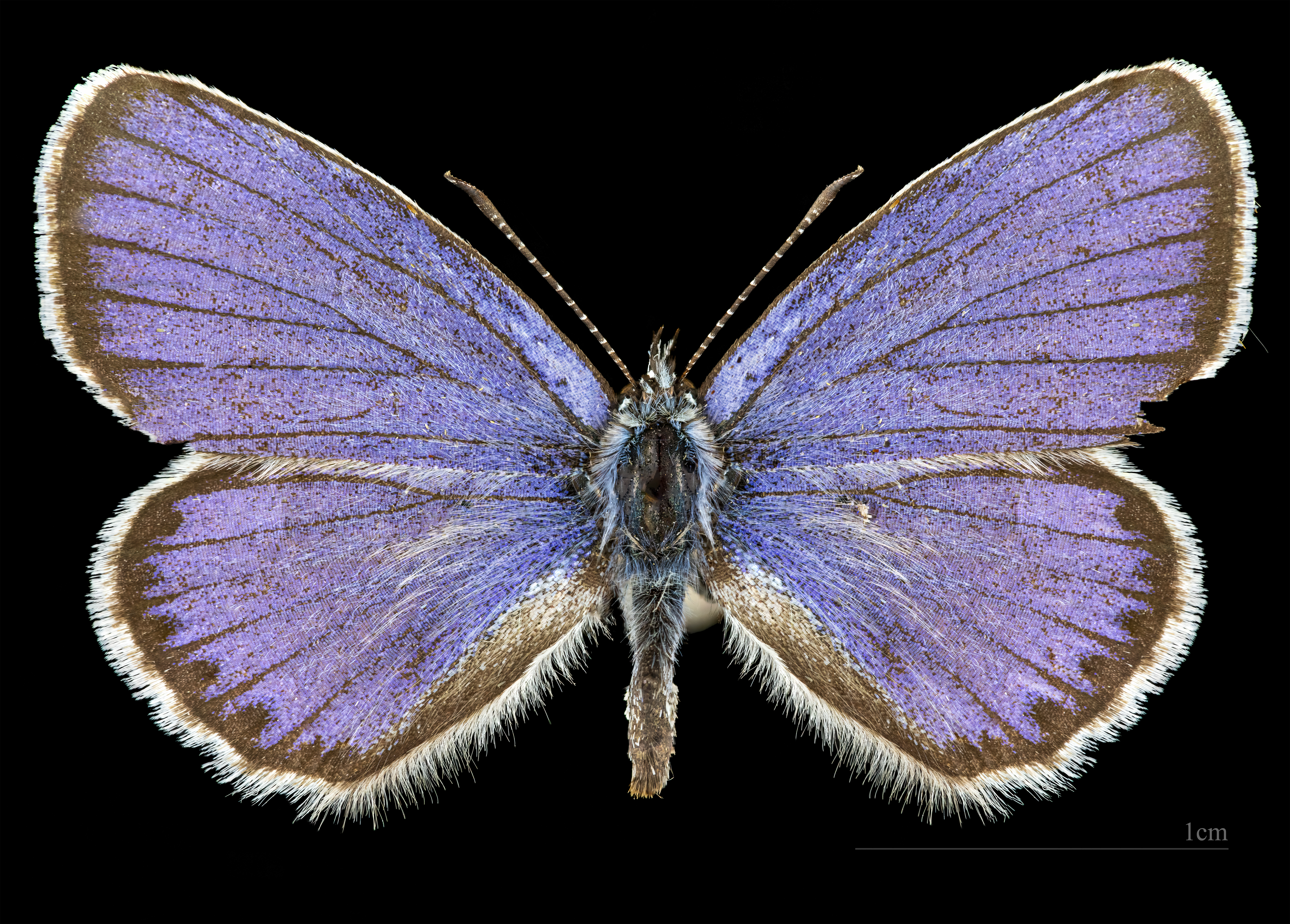
Plebejus a. argyrognomon ♂

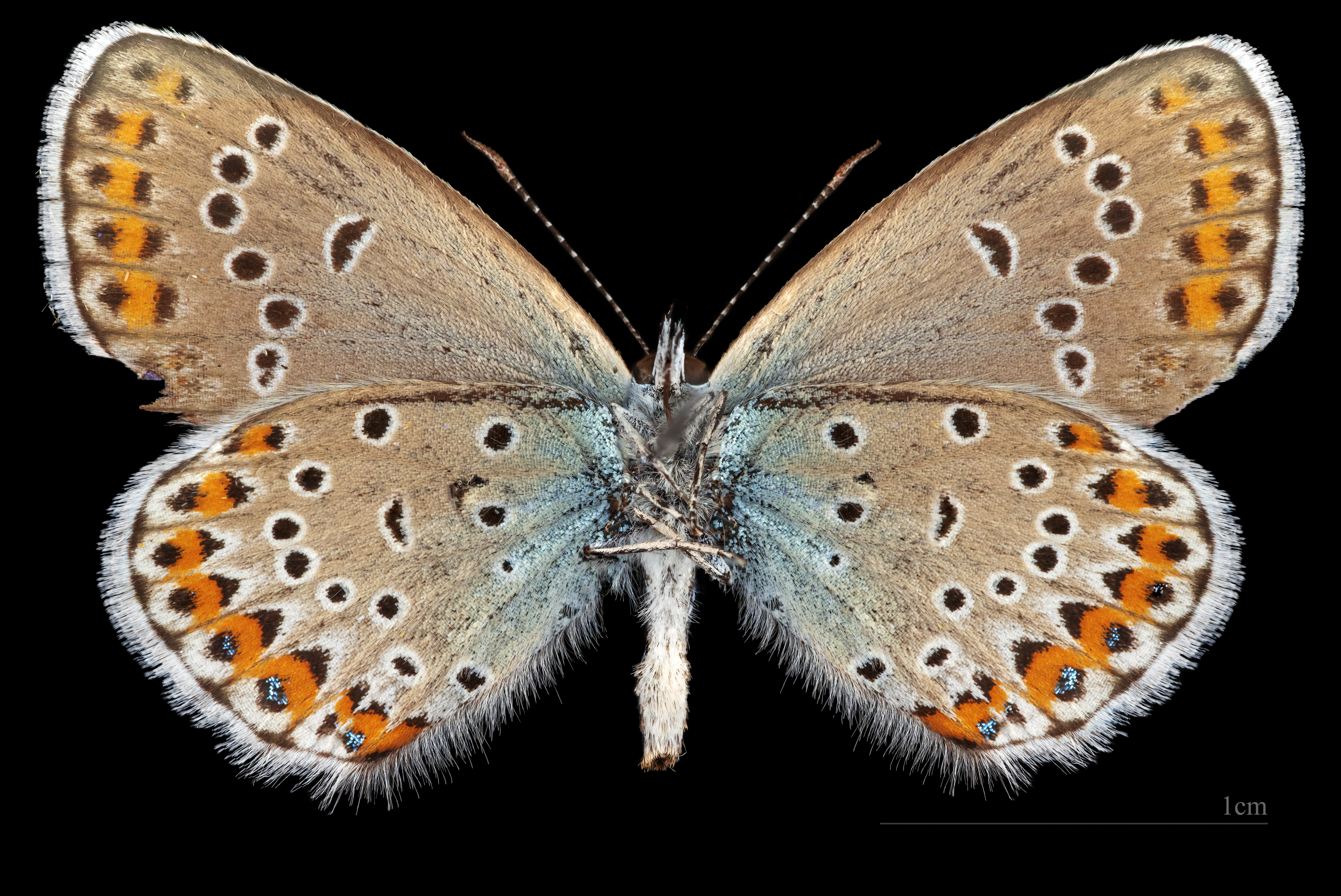
♂ △

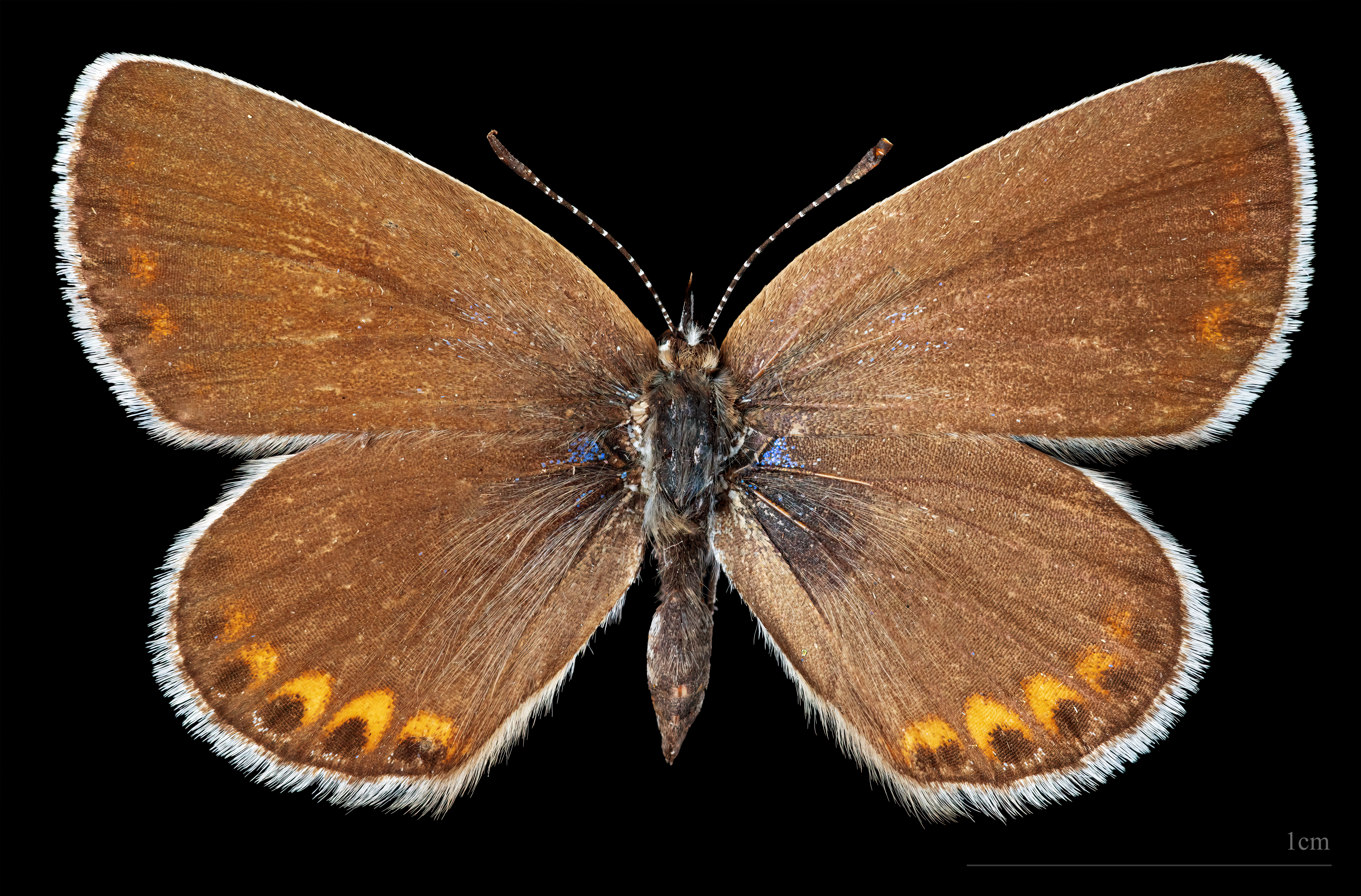
♀

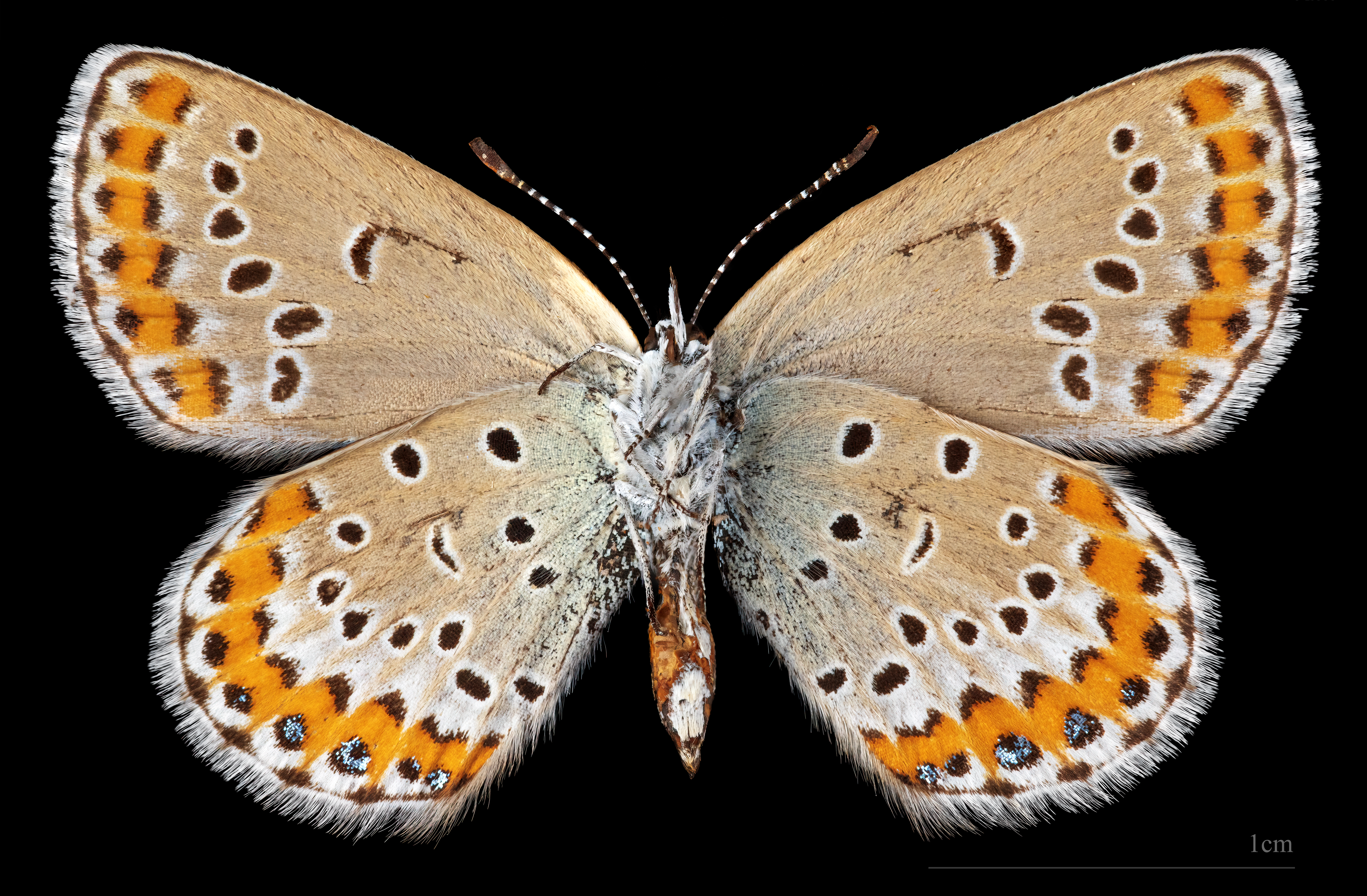
♀ △

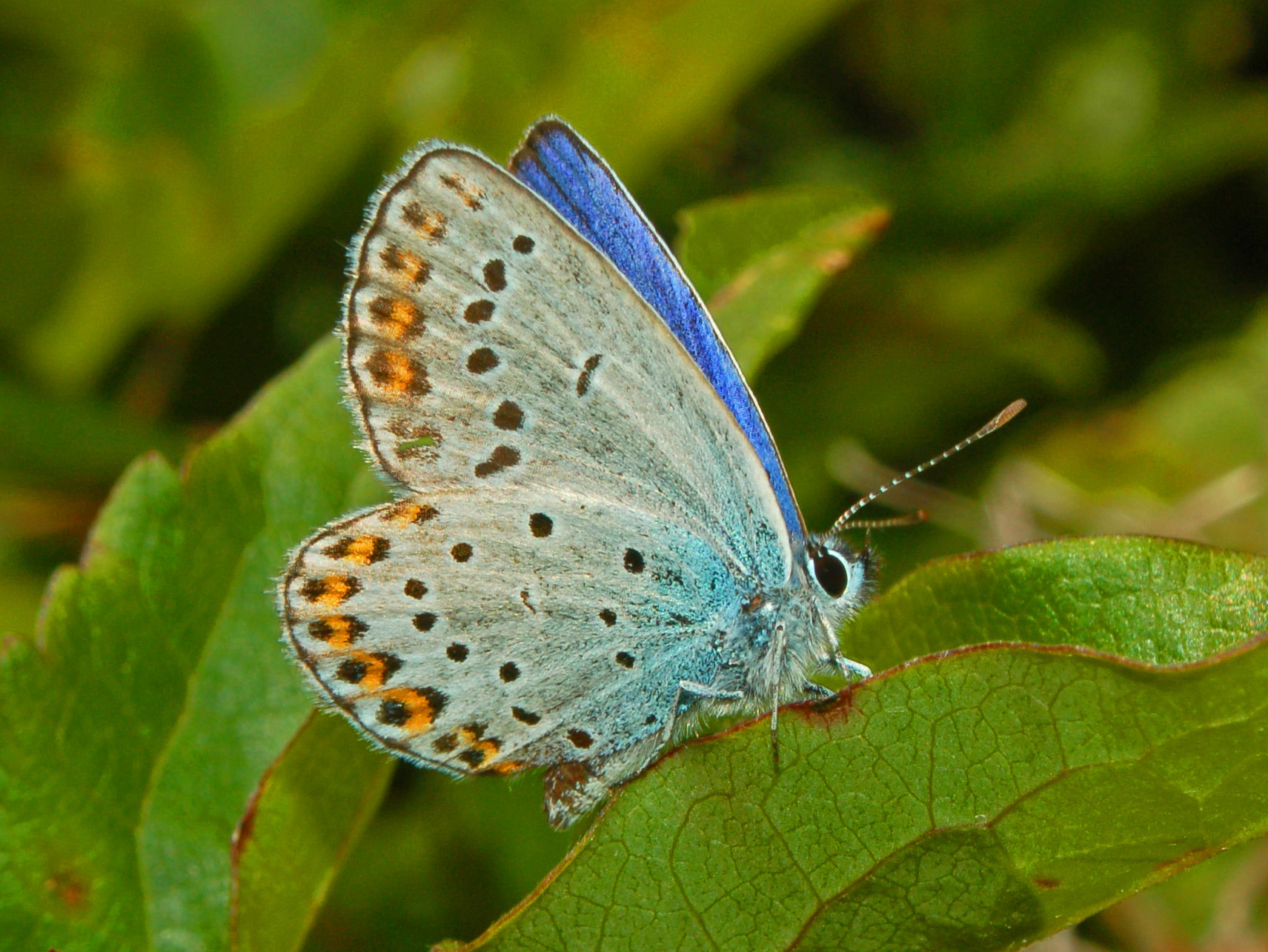
Male of Plebejus argyrognomon

This species is similar to Plebejus argus, Plebejus idas, Plebejus pylaon and Polyommatus escheri. In Plebejus argyrognomon the underside of the wings is similar to Plebejus argus and Plebejus idas, but the background color is more gray and the black spots are relatively smaller.

== Biology ==
The species fly in two broods from May to August depending on the location. The larvae feed on Coronilla varia, Securigera varia, Trifolium repens, Melilotus officinalis, Medicago sativa, Lotus corniculatus, Onobrychis viciifolia, Vicia sativa and Astragalus glycyphyllos. Larvae are attended by ants Lasius niger, Lasius alienus, Myrmica sabuleti, Myrmica scabrinodis and Camponotus vagus.

== Etymology ==
Argyrognomon (from Latin) is a silver pointer on a sundial.
