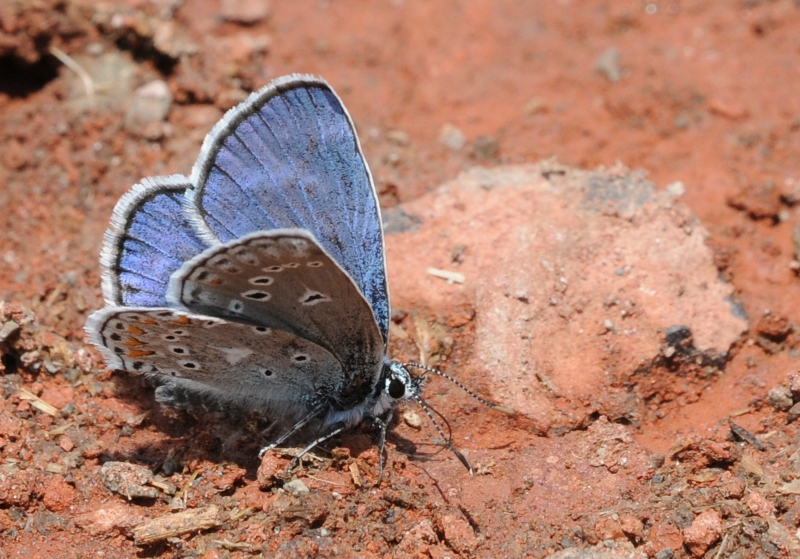
- Male, in Turkey.

Scientific classification
- Domain: Eukaryota
- Kingdom: Animalia
- Phylum: Arthropoda
- Class: Insecta
- Order: Lepidoptera
- Family: Lycaenidae
- Genus: Kretania
- Species: K. zephyrinus

Binomial name
- Kretania zephyrinus (Christoph, 1884)

Synonyms
- Lycaena zephyrinus Christoph, 1884; Plebejus zephyrinus; Plebejus pylaon zephyrinus; Plebejides zephyrinus

= Kretania zephyrinus =

Species of butterfly

Kretania zephyrinus is a butterfly found in the East Palearctic (Central Asia) that belongs to the blues family.

== Subspecies ==
- K. z. zephyrinus Kopet-Dagh
- K. z. ordubadi (Forster, 1938) Caucasus Major, Armenia (highlands), Talysh
- K. z. forsteri (Bálint, 1990) Dzhungarsky Alatau Mountains
- K. z. tarbagataiensis (Bálint, 1992) Saur, Tarbagatai, South Altai

== Description from Seitz ==
zephyrinus Christ. (78 h) has zephyrinus. the black margin broader above and the ocelli of the underside larger; from Pamir and Turkestan. —

== Biology ==
The larva feeds on Astragalus species.

== See also ==
- List of butterflies of Russia
