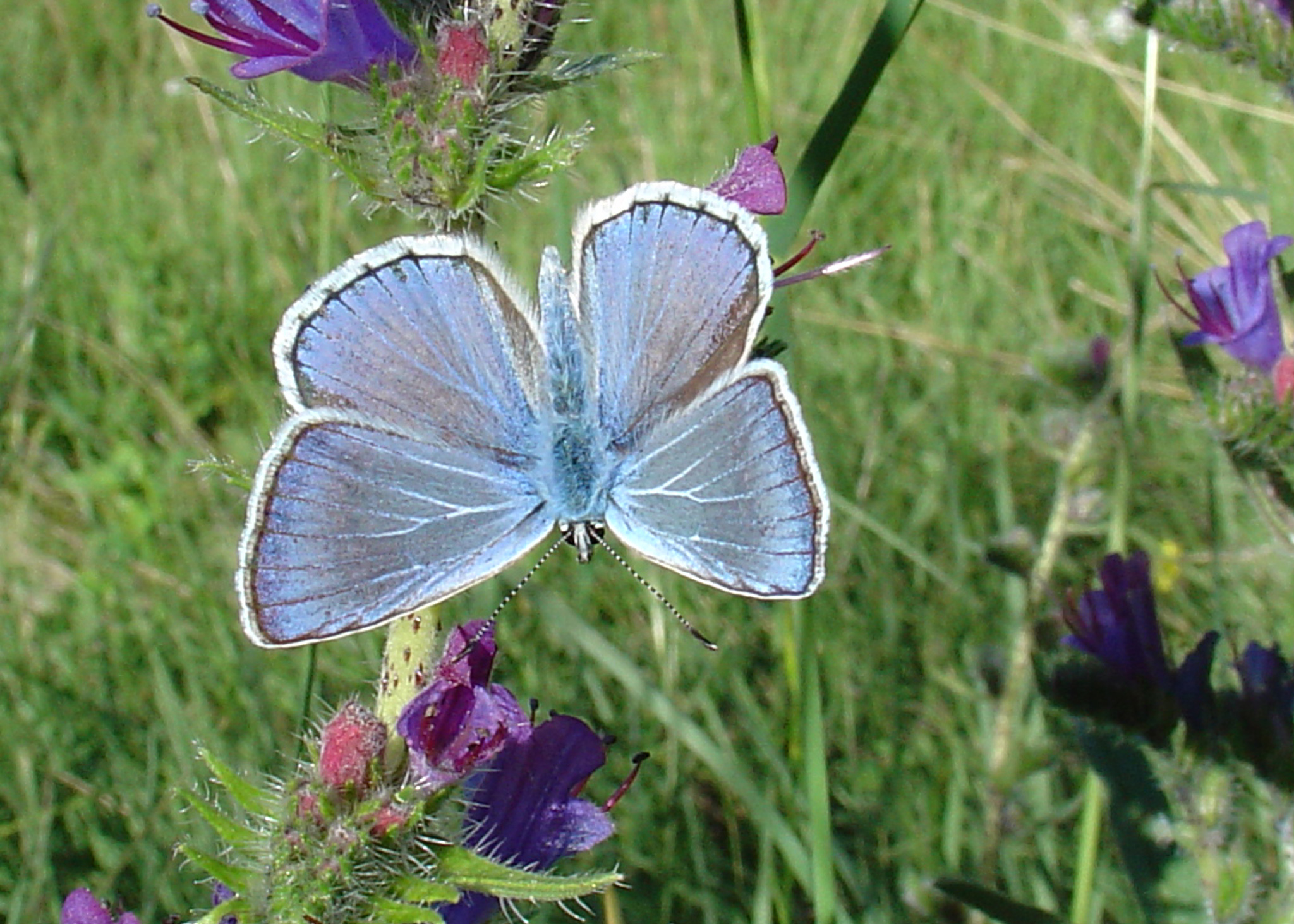

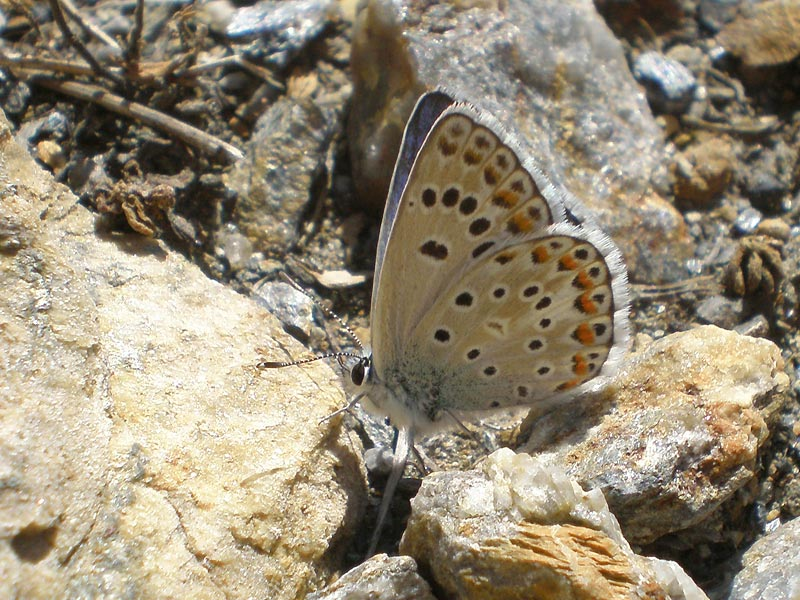

Scientific classification
- Kingdom: Animalia
- Phylum: Arthropoda
- Clade: Pancrustacea
- Class: Insecta
- Order: Lepidoptera
- Family: Lycaenidae
- Genus: Polyommatus
- Species: P. escheri

Binomial name
- Polyommatus escheri Hübner, 1823

= Polyommatus escheri =

Species of butterfly

Polyommatus escheri, Escher's blue, is a butterfly of the family Lycaenidae. It is found in Southern Europe and Morocco.

== Description in Seitz ==
L. escheri Hbn. (81 a, b). male and female above similar to icarus, but much larger; the underside more prominently spotted, with more numerous ocelli, but the forewing beneath always without basal ocelli; the ground-colour of the underside in the male more shaded with grey and in the female sometimes darkened to a chocolate-brown; moreover, the discal row of ocelli of the hindwing is more proximal, standing nearer the discocellular spot than in icarus. Southern Europe, from Spain to the Balkan Peninsula, northwards extending into the Alps. Females with the upperside strongly dusted with blue are ab. subapennina Tur. — dalmatica Spey. (81 b) is the form from Dalmatia; the male is lighter blue, more similar in colour to hylas than to icarus; the black margin, which is very narrow in escheri is here broader, and the hindwing above bears very weak traces of dark spots at the margin. If these spots are especially distinct, we have ab. punctulata Wheel. — Egg of the usual flattened from, pure white, with small projections at the corners of the meshes of the minute network. Larva until April on Astragalus and Plantago. The butterflies commence to fly at the end of June, occurring in mountain valleys, singly but not rarely; they have a rather clumsy flight and frequent specially the beds of brooks. The length of the forewings is 17–19 mm.

== Subspecies ==
- P. e. escheri
- P. e. dalmatica (Speyer, 1882) Balkans
- P. e. splendens (Stefanelli, 1904) Apennines
- P. e. helenae (Oberthür, 1910) Charente-Inférieure, Dompierre-s-Mer
- P. e. roseonitens (Oberthür, 1910) Spain
- P. e. balestrei (Fruhstorfer, 1910) Alpes Maritimes
- P. e. ahmar (Le Cerf, 1928) Morocco (Tizi-n-Tiskrine)
- P. e. parnassica (Brown, 1977) Greece

== Biology ==
The butterfly flies from May to August.

The larvae feed on Astragalus species and possibly sainfoin.
