= Katutau mountains =

Mountain range in Kazakhstan

Coordinates: 44°10′N 79°10′E

The Katutau mountains (translated as "harsh mountains") are located in Altyn-Emel National Park, Kazakhstan. They are volcanic in origin. The highest point of Katutau reaches a height of 1720 m.

== History ==
These volcanic mountains of the Permian period are composed of lavas, tuffs, rhyolites, andesites, dacites, diabases, and basalts. In places, they break through Permian and Triassic intrusions of granites, diorites, and gabbro. In the Eastern and Western parts of Katutau, there are two paleovolcano. The most common form is large lava domes. Volcanic eruptions were powerful — heavy avalanches and scorching clouds loaded with debris covered large areas. Bomb-ash and lava flows and covers intersperse with each other. They have different capacities, sometimes reaching 100 m. In the South-Eastern foothills of Katutau, there are highlands called the Tiger mountains because of the color of the clays that compose these mountains. The highlands have been rising for the last two million years. The breed is very fragile and crumbles from any physical impact. Water, time, and wind had carved strange shapes in the rock. The sedimentary rock of the bottom of the ancient Tethys ocean has been preserved, which has taken the form of intricate figures and landscapes due to the influence of the natural factors listed above.

== Protection ==
The natural monument is protected by the state national natural Park "Altyn-Emel." It is located in the Ili river valley, Almaty region. It has a Favorable acoustic environment (silence, melodic sounds in nature). Recommended visit periods: April–October. The inspection is effective at any time of the day, including at night.

== Sources ==
- Marikovsky P. I. The Fate Of Charyn. Almaty: Foundation "XXI century", 1997.-120.
- Marikovsky P. I. the Commandments of the singing dune. Almaty: "GYLYM", 1997.-214.
- Marikovsky P. I. in the deserts of Kazakhstan-M: "Thought" 1978.-125.
- Luterovich O. G. Three popular excursions in Semirechye: a guide, Almaty: "Service Press", 2016.- 92c.
- Maryashev Monuments of Semirechye archeology and their use in excursions-Almaty, 2002.
- A. P. Gorbunov Mountains Of Central Asia. Explanatory dictionary of geographical names and terms. Almaty, 2006.
