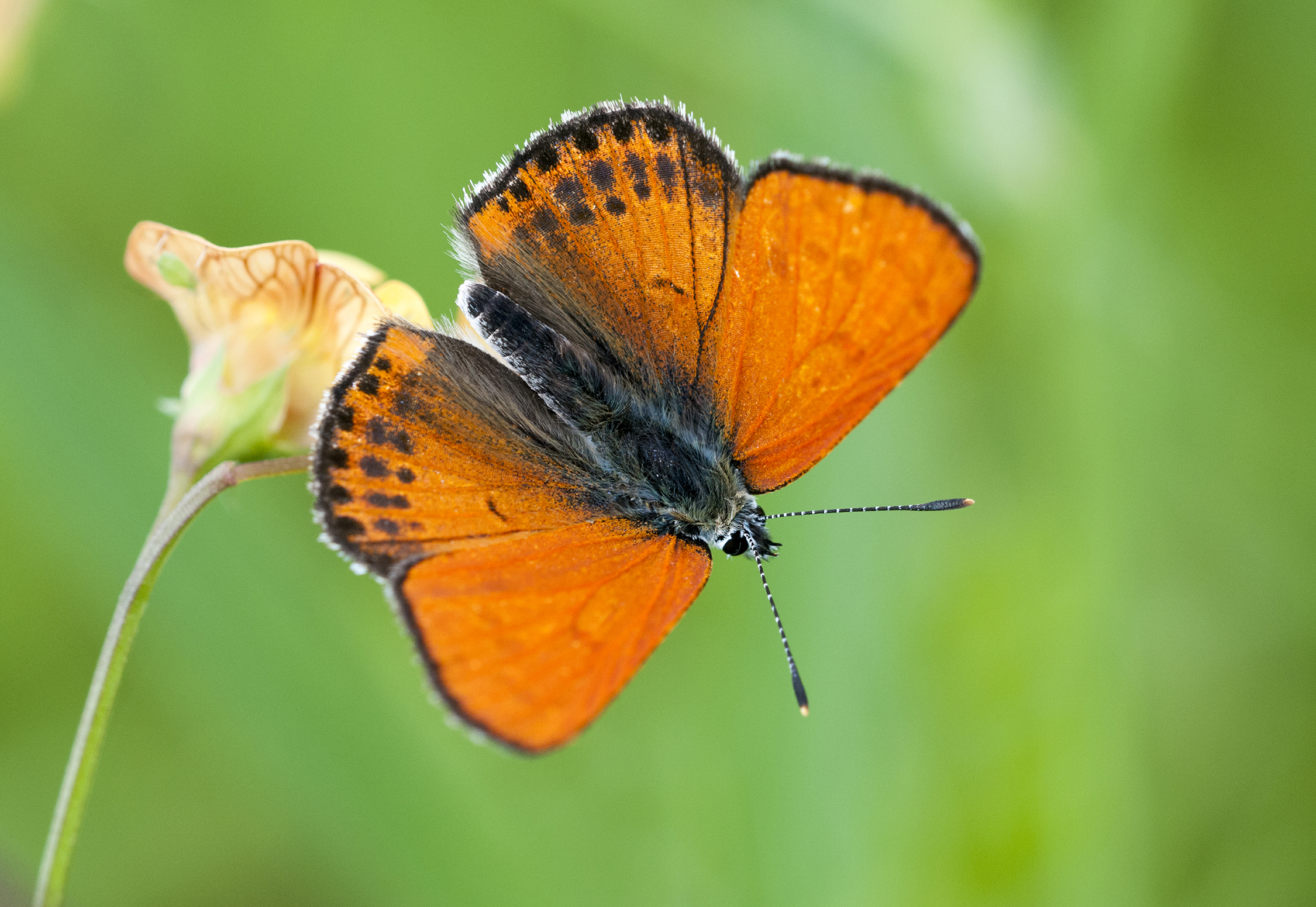
- male
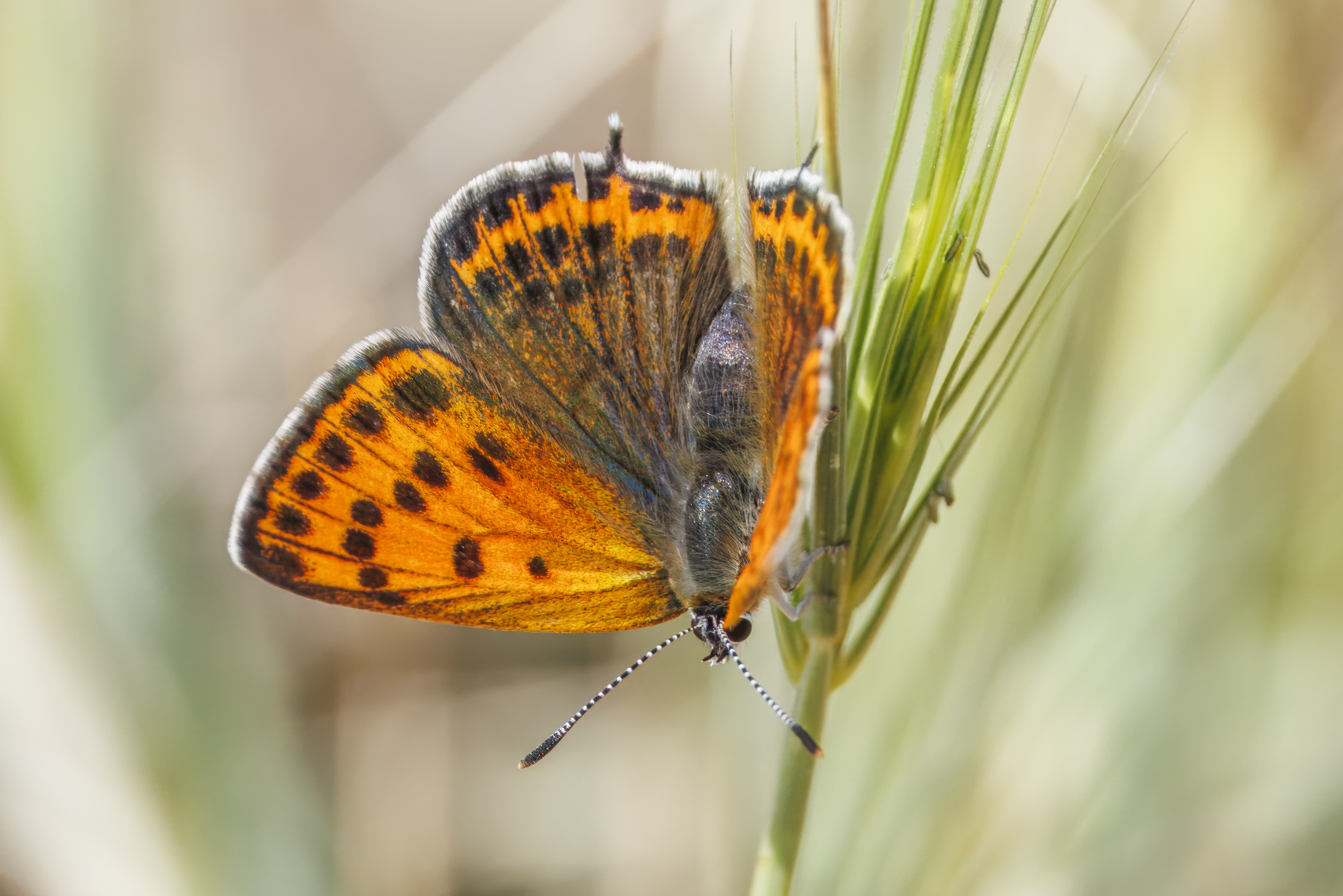
- female

Scientific classification
- Kingdom: Animalia
- Phylum: Arthropoda
- Class: Insecta
- Order: Lepidoptera
- Family: Lycaenidae
- Genus: Lycaena
- Species: L. thersamon

Binomial name
- Lycaena thersamon Esper, 1784

= Lycaena thersamon =

Species of butterfly

Lycaena thersamon, the lesser fiery copper, is a butterfly of the family Lycaenidae. It is found from Eastern Europe, Italy and South-East Europe to Mongolia and North-Western China.

The wingspan is 14–16 mm. The butterfly flies from April to October depending on the location.

The larvae feed on Polygonum aviculare, and possibly other Polygonaceae species.

== Description from Seitz ==
C. thersamon Esp. (= xanthe Hhn.) (76 e). Bright golden red; but the hindwing, also in the male, so much dusted with dark scaling that a light submarginal band contrasts with the ground. On the underside the disc of the forewing and the submarginal band of the hindwing both cinnabar-red, contrasting with the grey ground. South-east Europe, the eastern districts of Italy opposite the Balkan Peninsula, Asia Minor and Turkestan, extending north-westwards to Hungary, Bohemia and Saxony. — omphale Klug (76 e) is the short-tailed summer-form, which flies from July until September. — In persica Bien. the upperside is very fiery and the dots of the median row on the hindwing beneath are larger; in the sub-alpine region of the mountains north-west of El Meshed (Persia). — alaica Gr.-Grsh. is washed with dark on the upperside, and has the underside more yellowish with larger dots. Ferghana. — Larva green, with swollen segments, the dorsal line yellow, thinly divided, the side-line likewise yellow, between the two lines darker oblique smears; head and legs brown; adult in June and again in the autumn on Sarothamnus and Rumex. The pupa evenly rounded, dark brown. The butterflies occur as tailless form in April and May, and again as omphale from July onward, flying on dry sunny hillsides, not being rare at their flight-places.

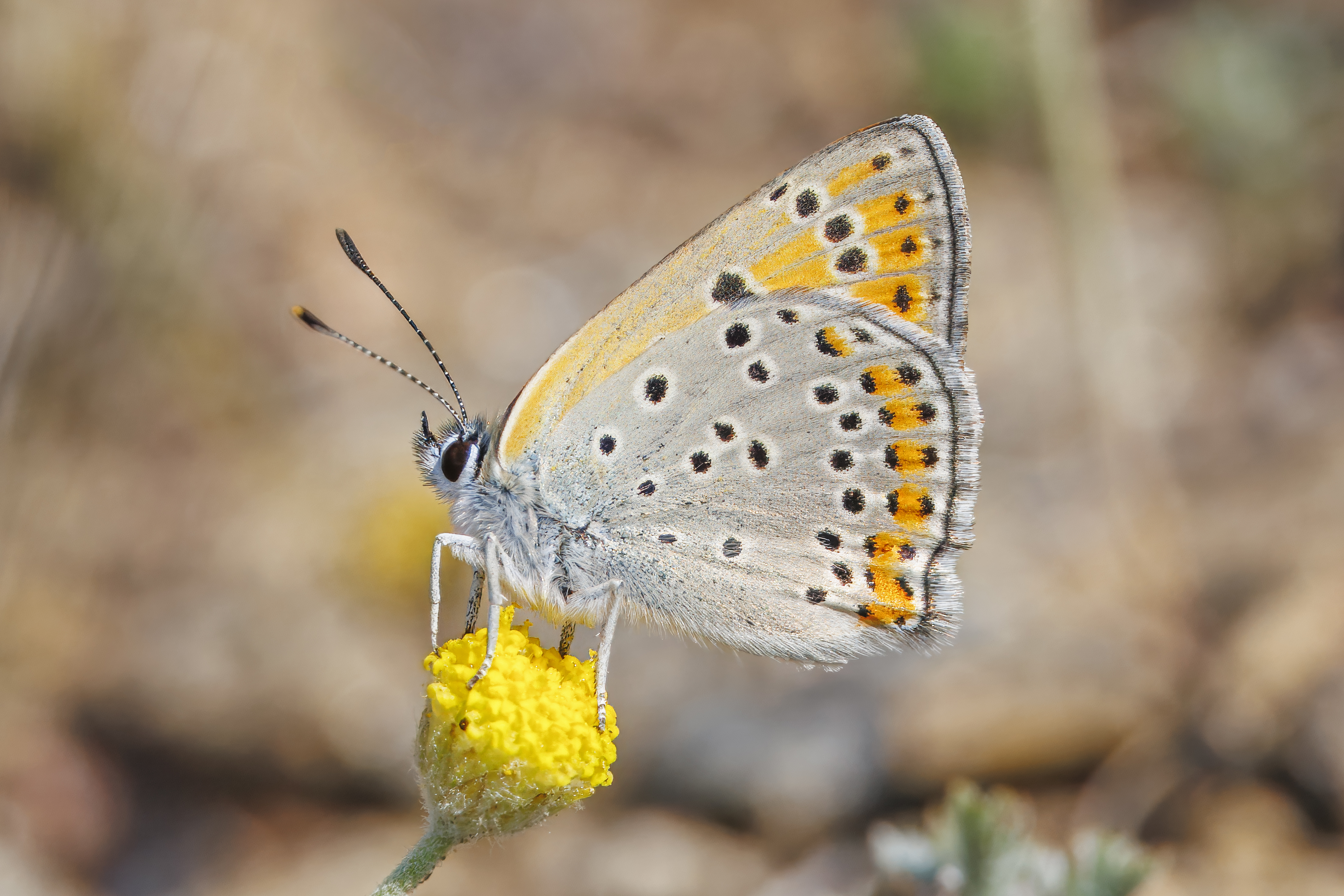
male

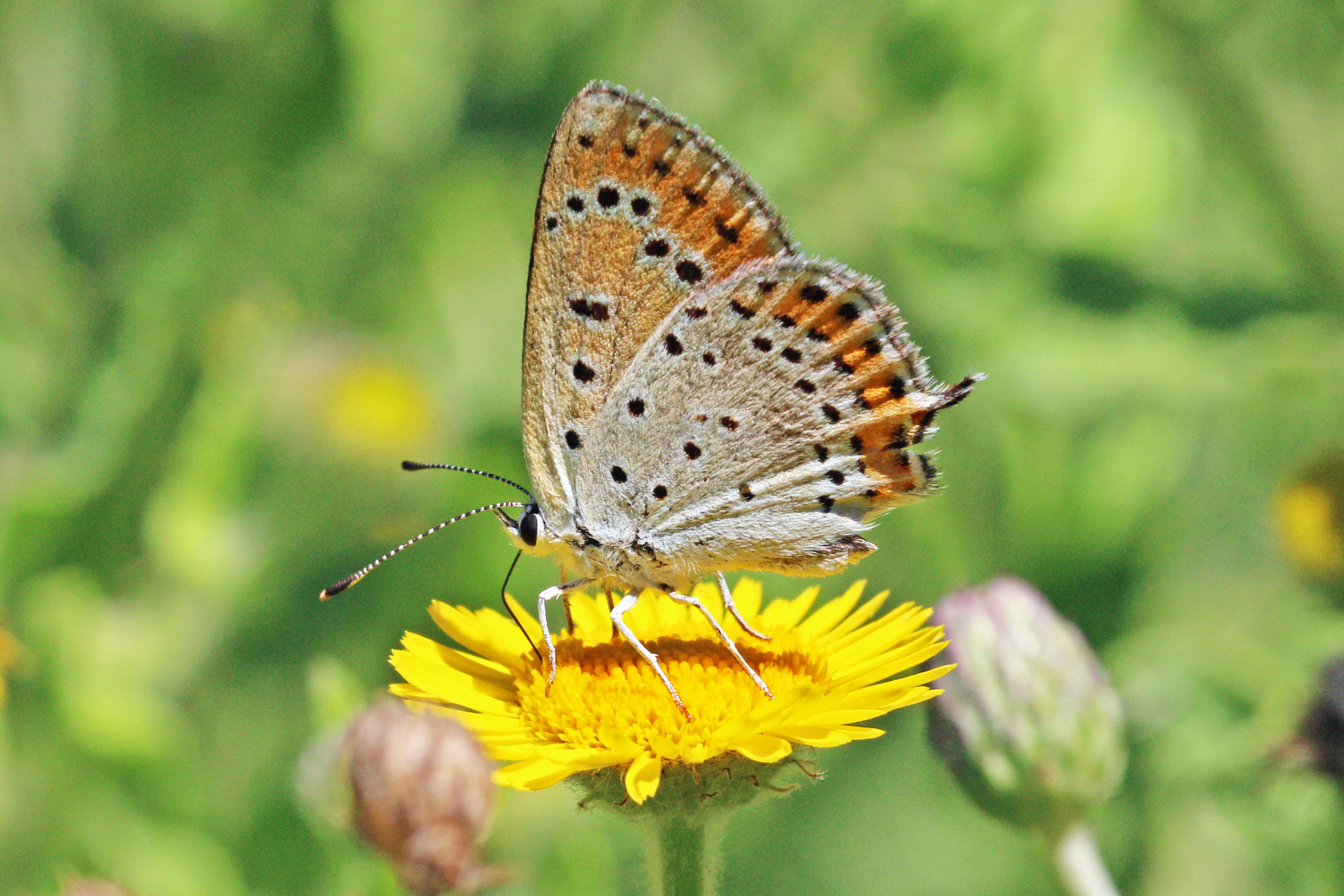
female
