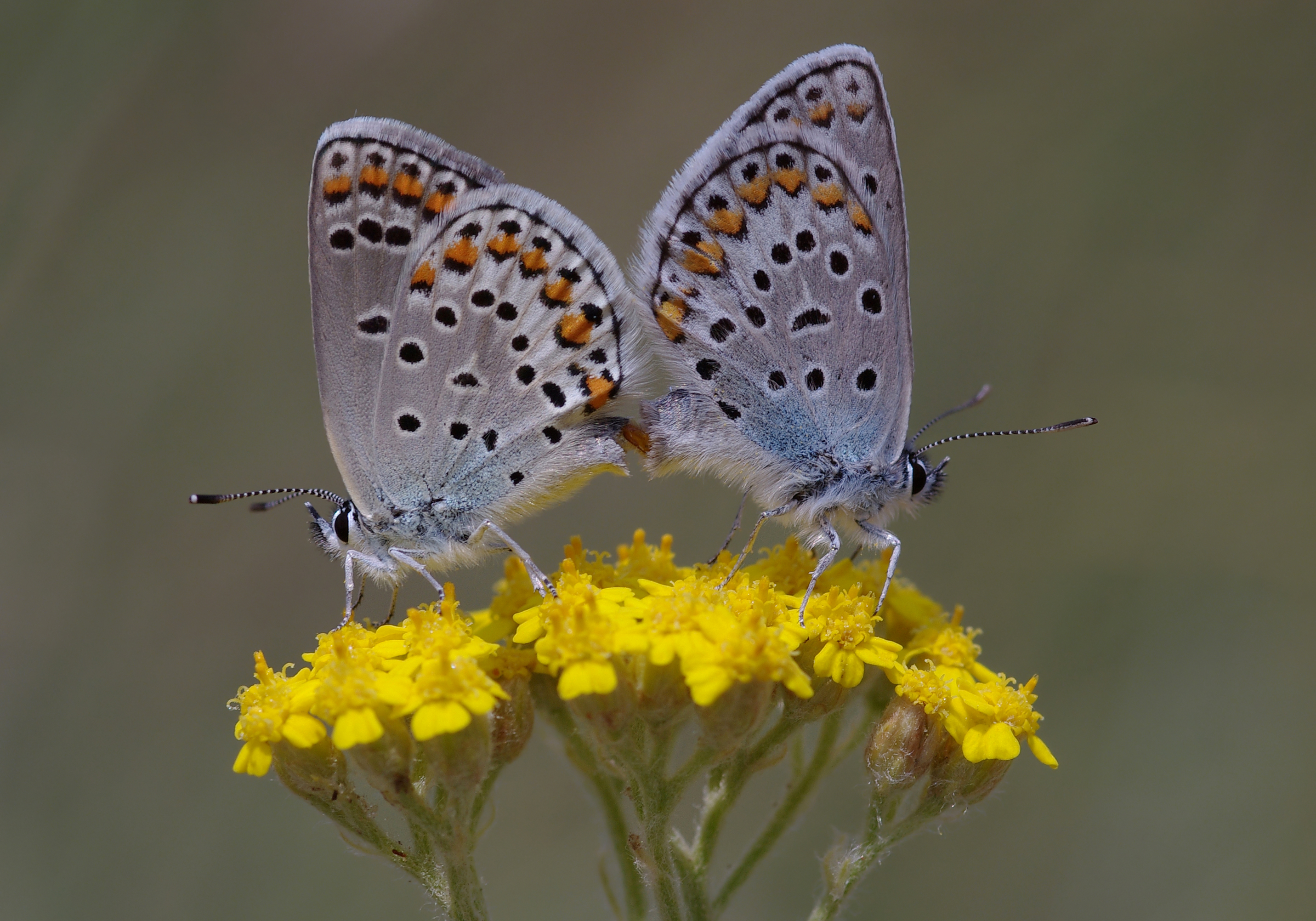
- Mating pair, in Turkey.

Scientific classification
- Kingdom: Animalia
- Phylum: Arthropoda
- Class: Insecta
- Order: Lepidoptera
- Family: Lycaenidae
- Genus: Kretania
- Species: K. eurypilus

Binomial name
- Kretania eurypilus (Freyer, 1852)

Synonyms
- Lycaena eurypilus Freyer, 1852; Plebejus eurypilus; Polyommatus eurypilus; Lycaena carmon Gerhard, 1851; Plebejus carmon

= Kretania eurypilus =

Species of butterfly

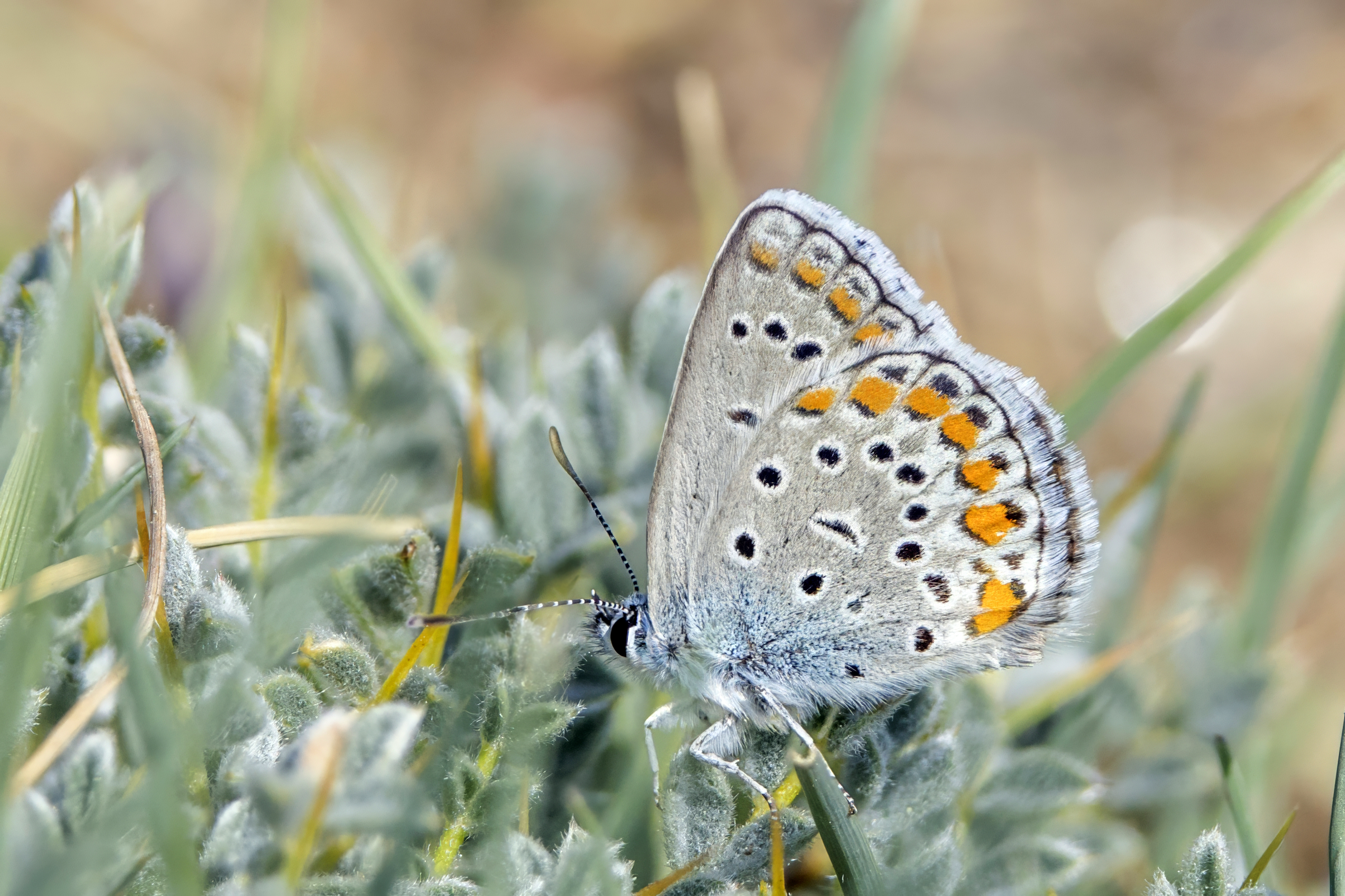
female, Turkey

Kretania eurypilus, the eastern brown argus, is a butterfly found in the East Palearctic (Balkans, Asia Minor, Iraq, Iran) that belongs to the family Lycaenidae.

== Subspecies ==
- K. e. eurypilus Asia Minor, Transcaucasia, West Iran
- K. e. euaemon (Hemming, 1931) Lebanon
- K. e. iranica (Forster, 1938)
- K. e. pelopides van der Poorten, 1984 South Greece
- K. e. khorasanus ten Hagen, 2013
- K. e. afgnaniensis ten Hagen, 2013
- K. e. kuhpayensis ten Hagen, 2013

== Description from Seitz ==
L. eurypilus Frr. (= carmon Gerh.) (78 g, h). Much smaller than the preceding forms, very similar to argus, but male not blue above but dark brown like the female, bearing often also like this sex red-yellow marginal spots in the anal area of the hindwing . — Asia Minor, Mesopotamia, Turkestan and North Persia, on rocky slopes, from May till July. Larva probably on Astragalus echinus, as the butterfly is especially plentiful where this plant grows.

== Biology ==
The larva feeds on Astracantha arnacanthoides, A. rumelica, A. gummifera, A. aurea, A. caucasica and is associated with the ant Camponotus kiesenwetteri.
