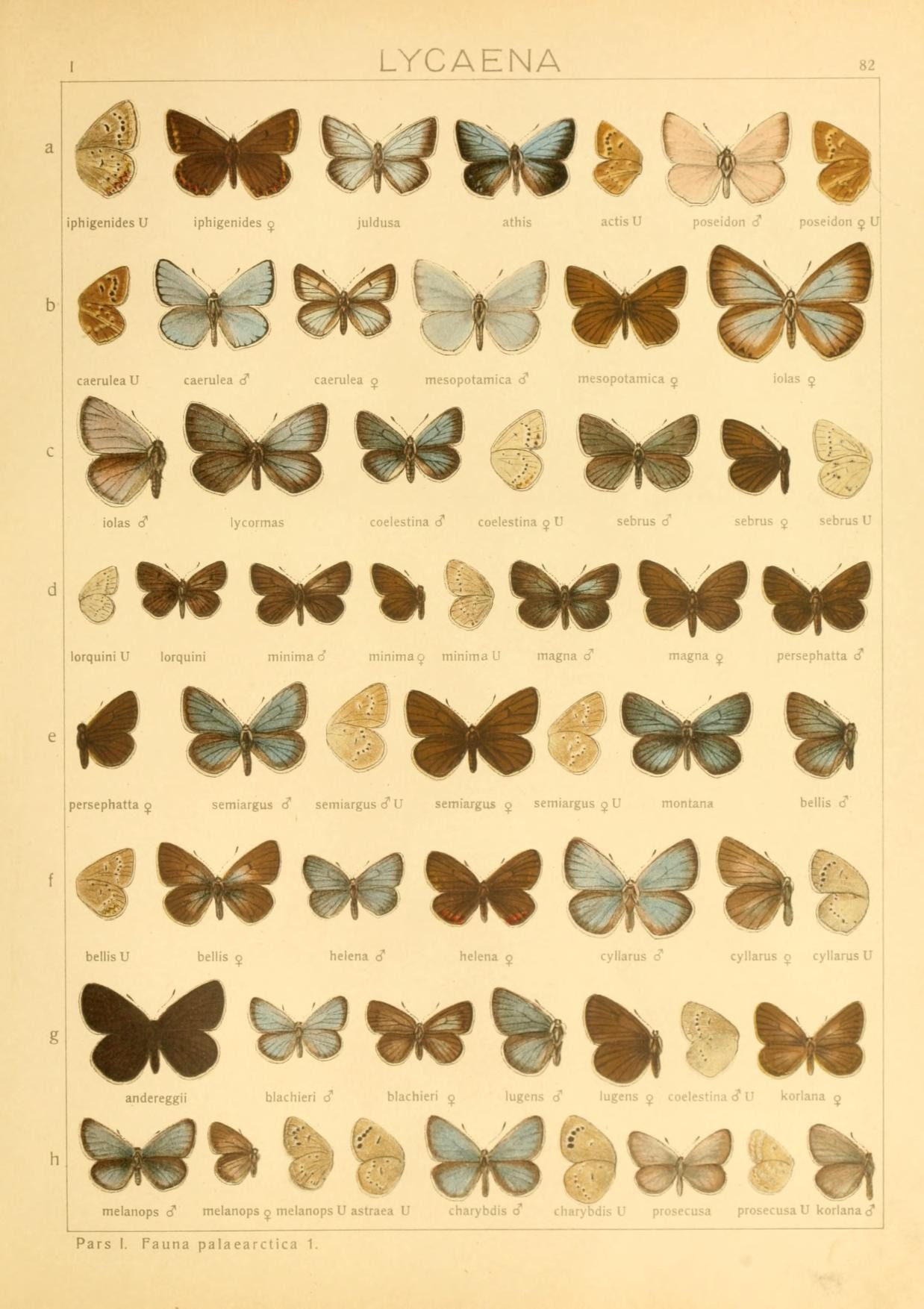
- Neolysandra coelestina in Seitz 82 c

Scientific classification
- Kingdom: Animalia
- Phylum: Arthropoda
- Clade: Pancrustacea
- Class: Insecta
- Order: Lepidoptera
- Family: Lycaenidae
- Genus: Neolysandra
- Species: N. coelestina

Binomial name
- Neolysandra coelestina (Eversmann, 1843)

Synonyms
- Lycaena coelestina Eversmann, 1843; Polyommatus coelestina; Polyommatus coelestinus; Agrodiaetus coelestina; Neolysandra coelestinus

= Neolysandra coelestina =

Species of butterfly

Neolysandra coelestina is a butterfly found in the Palearctic that belongs to the blues family.

== Subspecies ==
- N. c. coelestina South Europe, NorthTuran, Southwest Siberia
- N. c. alticola (Christoph, 1886) Armenia (highland), Caucasus, Asia Minor, Kurdistan
- N. c. iranica (Pfeiffer, 1938) North Iran
- N. c. saadii Eckweiler & Schurian, 1980 Iran

== Description from Seitz ==
L. coelestina Ev. (82 c). Male reddish violet-blue (not so deep blue as in our figure), similar in colour to athis with black border and black discocellular spot; hindwing with black marginal dots. Female black brown, with obsolescent reddish yellow submarginal spots. The underside is very characteristical, the hindwing beneath being dusted with bright metallic pale blue from the base close to the margin. In the South Eussian steppes, at Sarepta, Orenburg, etc . in the Caucasus. — alticola Christ, is a smaller form from Armenia with the ocelli of the hindwing beneath obsolescent, the verdigris-dusting occupying nearly the whole hindwing, and with broader border to the upperside of the forewing. In June.

== Biology ==
The larva feeds on Melilotus, Trifolium, Anthyllis vulneraria, Vicia cracca

== See also ==
- List of butterflies of Russia
