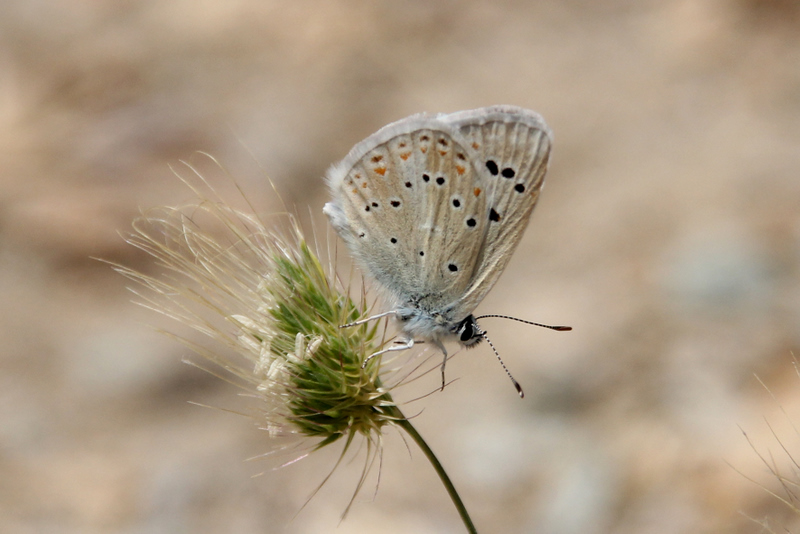

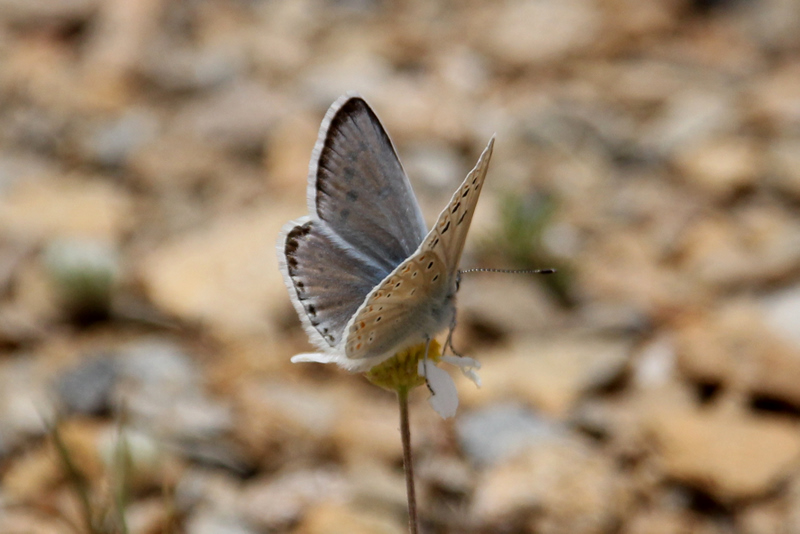

Conservation status
- Near Threatened (IUCN 3.1)

Scientific classification
- Kingdom: Animalia
- Phylum: Arthropoda
- Class: Insecta
- Order: Lepidoptera
- Family: Lycaenidae
- Genus: Polyommatus
- Species: P. nivescens

Binomial name
- Polyommatus nivescens (Keferstein, 1851)

Synonyms
- Lycaena dorylas var. nivescens Keferstein, 1851; Plebicula nivescens

= Polyommatus nivescens =

Species of butterfly

Polyommatus nivescens, the mother-of-pearl blue, is a species of butterfly in the family Lycaenidae. It is found in Spain. It is a small butterfly is sexual dimorphic. The upperside of the male is very clear, with just a bluish beige reflection bordered by a thin grey line and a marginal line of small grey dots. The female upperside is brown, decorated with a marginal line of large orange maculae bordering the hindwings and part of the forewings. Both have a white fringe. The underside is light ochre marked with a marginal line of white lunules topped with orange, and adorned with a line of black dots circled in white very marked on the fore.

In Seitz it is described thus nivescens Kef. (= albicans Dup.& Gerh.) (80 i) is a form [of Polyommatus dorylas ] flying in Spain on limestone. The upperside of the male is dull grey-violet with a white silky gloss, similar to dolus, menalcas and coridon albicans. — Larva very similar to that of icarus, dark green, with black head, blackish dorsal line and yellow side-stripe; at each side of the dorsal line yellowish smears.

It favours dry, scrubby calcareous rock sites. The larvae feed on Anthyllis vulneraria.
