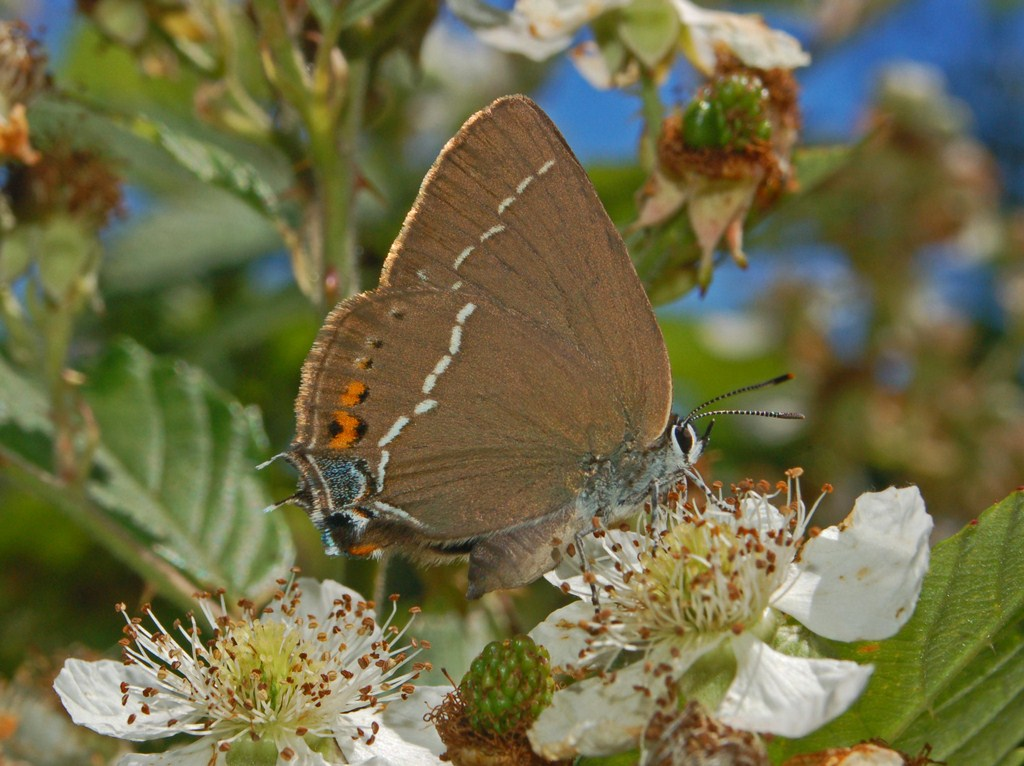
- Satyrium spini, underside

Scientific classification
- Kingdom: Animalia
- Phylum: Arthropoda
- Clade: Pancrustacea
- Class: Insecta
- Order: Lepidoptera
- Family: Lycaenidae
- Genus: Satyrium
- Species: S. spini

Binomial name
- Satyrium spini (Schiffermüller, 1775)

Synonyms
- Papilio spini [Denis & Schiffermüller], 1775; Papilio lynceus Esper, 1779; Nordmannia spini ([Denis & Schiffermüller], 1775); Strymonidia spini ([Denis & Schiffermüller], 1775)

= Satyrium spini =

Blue spot hairstreak

Species of butterfly

Satyrium spini, the blue spot hairstreak, is a butterfly in the family Lycaenidae.

== Subspecies ==
Subspecies include:

- Satyrium spini spini – (Southern and Central Europe)
- Satyrium spini melantho (Klug, 1834) – (Caucasus, Armenia, Talysh Mountains, Kopet-Dagh)

== Distribution ==
The blue spot hairstreak lives in southern and middle Europe (Portugal, Spain, France, Italy, Switzerland, Austria, Germany, Poland, Hungary, Croatia, Greece, Turkey) up to approximately 54° N. It is also found in Asia Minor, Lebanon, Iraq, Iran, South Urals. It is not found in the northwest of France, the Netherlands, Great Britain, Ireland, Scandinavia, Estonia or Latvia. It is also not found in large parts of Italy and on most Mediterranean islands. It inhabits open shrubby places, grassy areas, mountain meadows and woodland clearings, from low levels to about 2000 m.

== Description ==
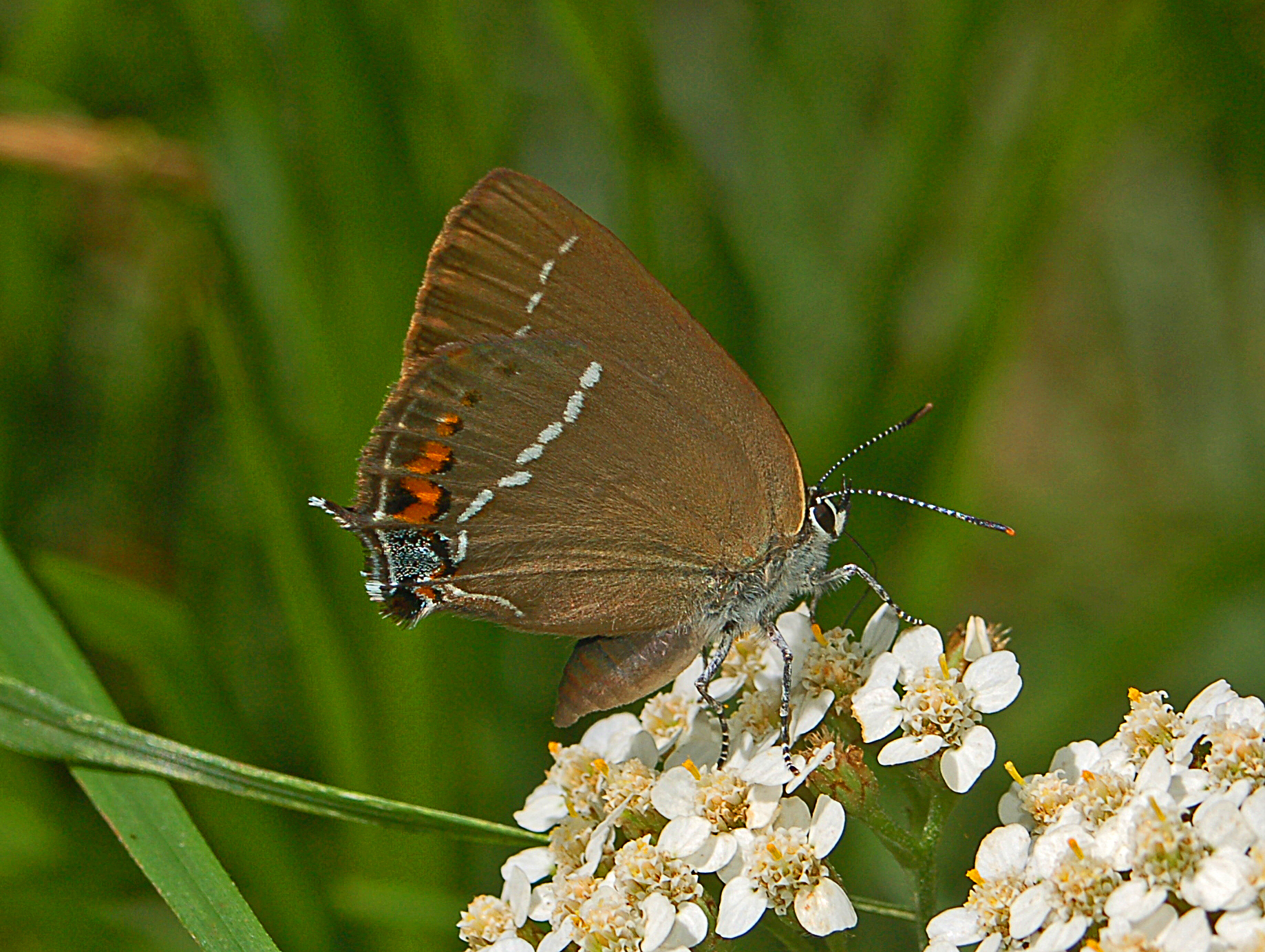
Blue spot hairstreak

Satyrium spini has frontwings reaching 14–16 millimetres (0.55–0.63 in) in males, 15–17 millimetres (0.59–0.67 in) in females. The basic color of the upperside of the wings is brownish, while the underside is yellowish-beige. In the females the upperside of the hindwings usually shows brownish-orange spots on the edge. The underside of the hindwings has a large blue spot and a few orange black bordered spots. The underside of forewings and hindwinhs is crossed by a bright white transverse line. Hind wings have short tails.

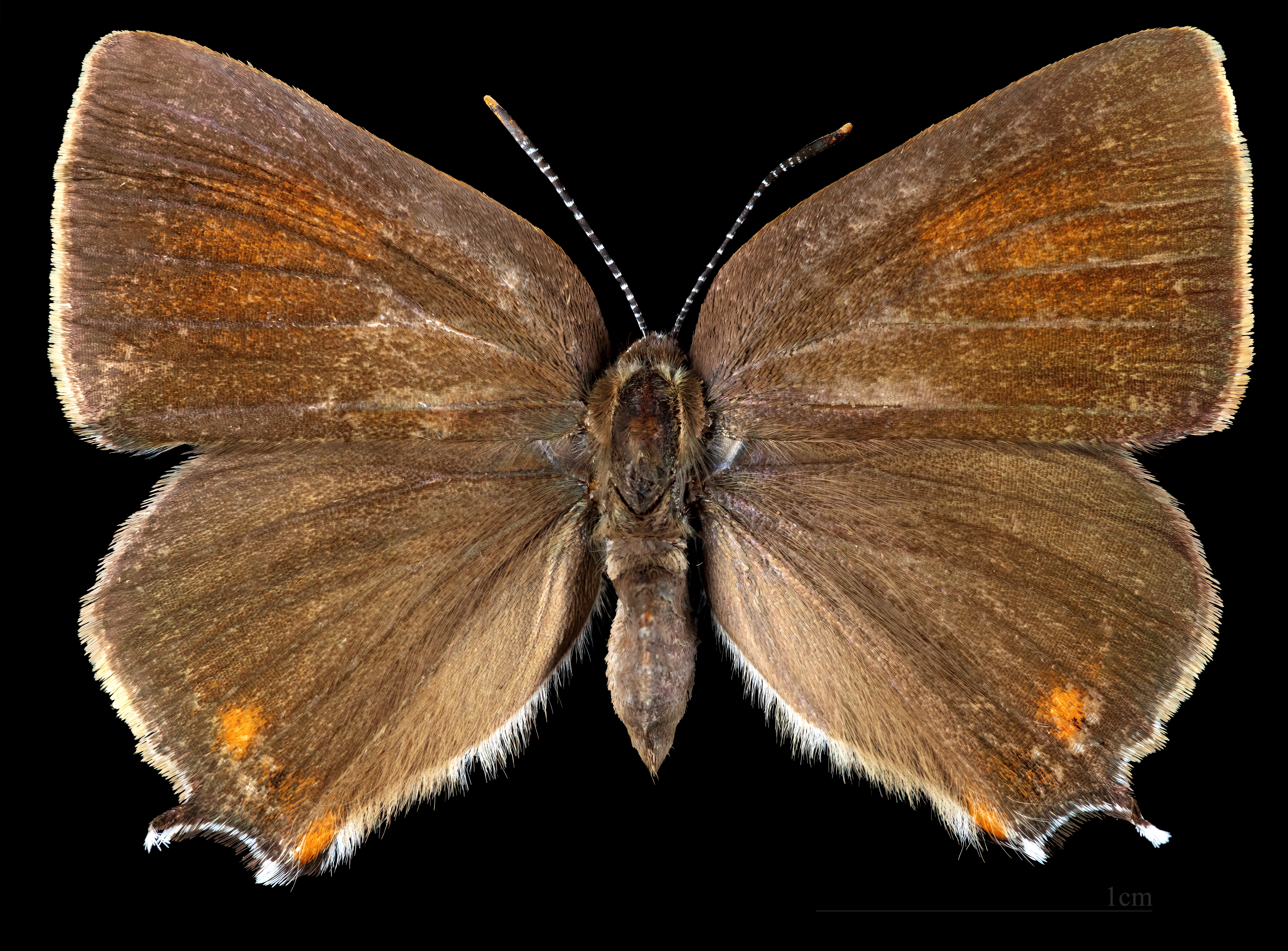
Satyrium spini ♂

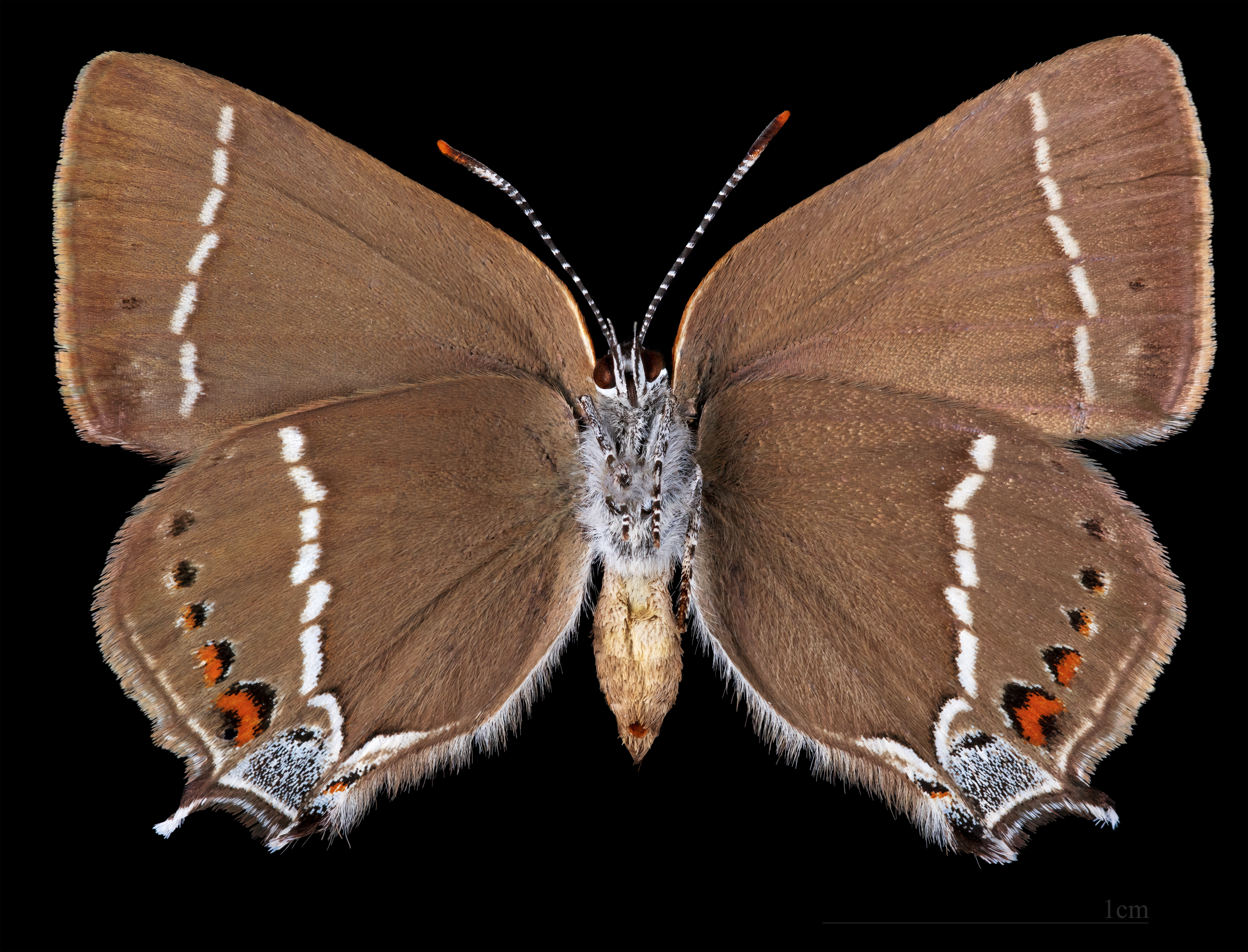
Satyrium spini ♂ △

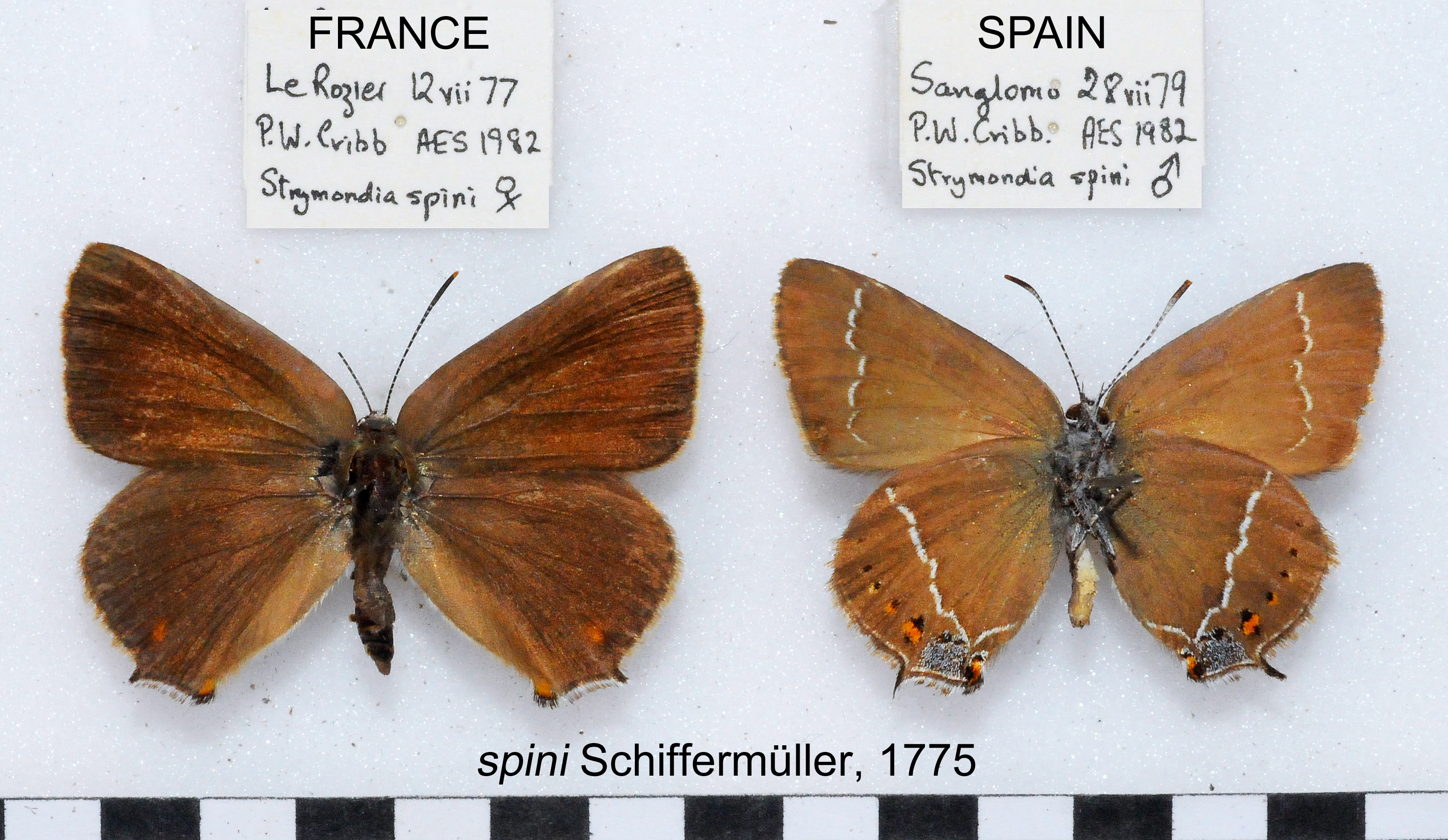
Mounted specimen. Female & male

== Biology ==
It is a univoltine species. Adults fly from late May to early August, depending on location. Caterpillars feed on Rhamnus, Prunus, Frangula alnus, Frangula daurica, Sorbus and Malus.
