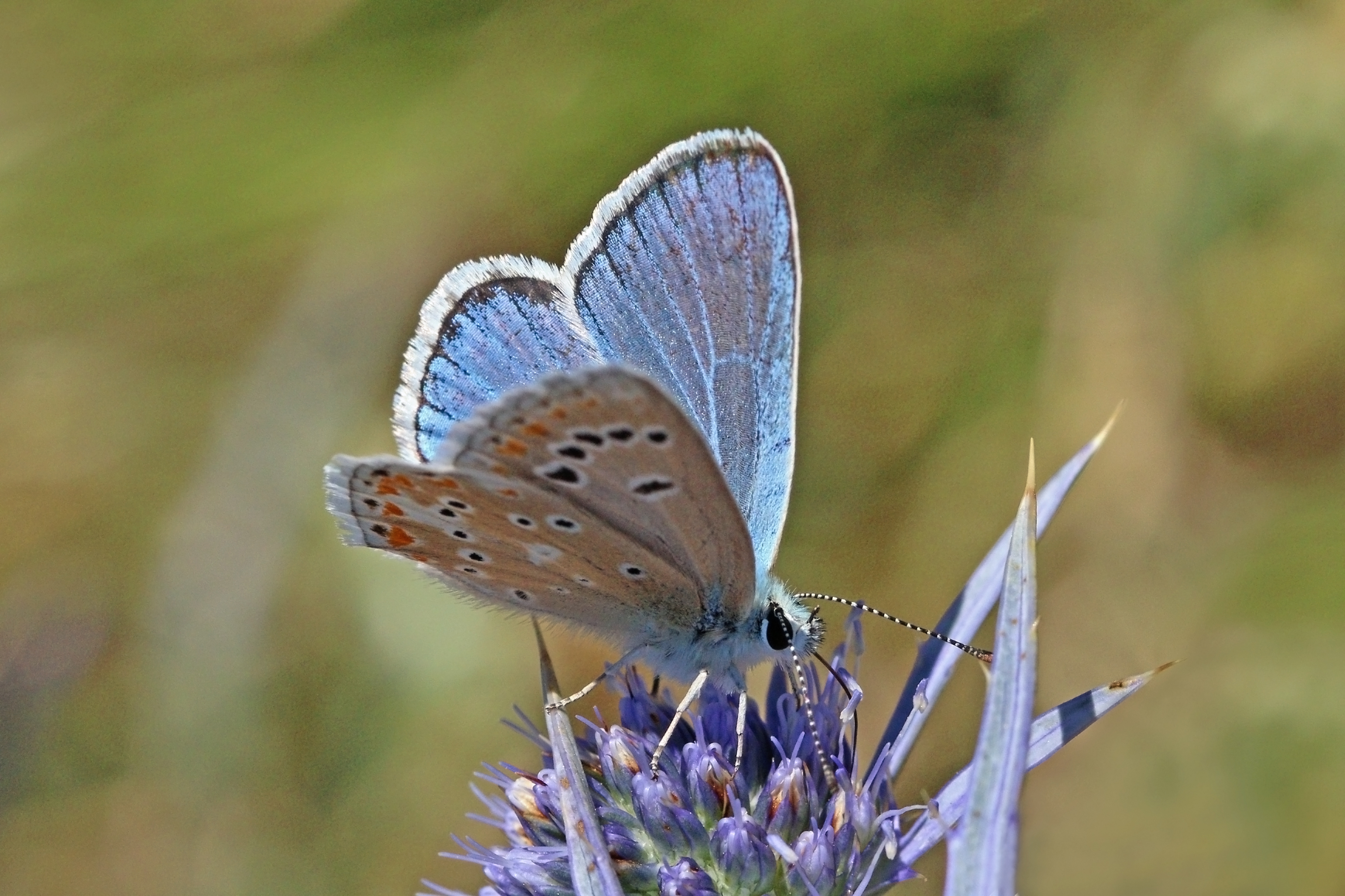

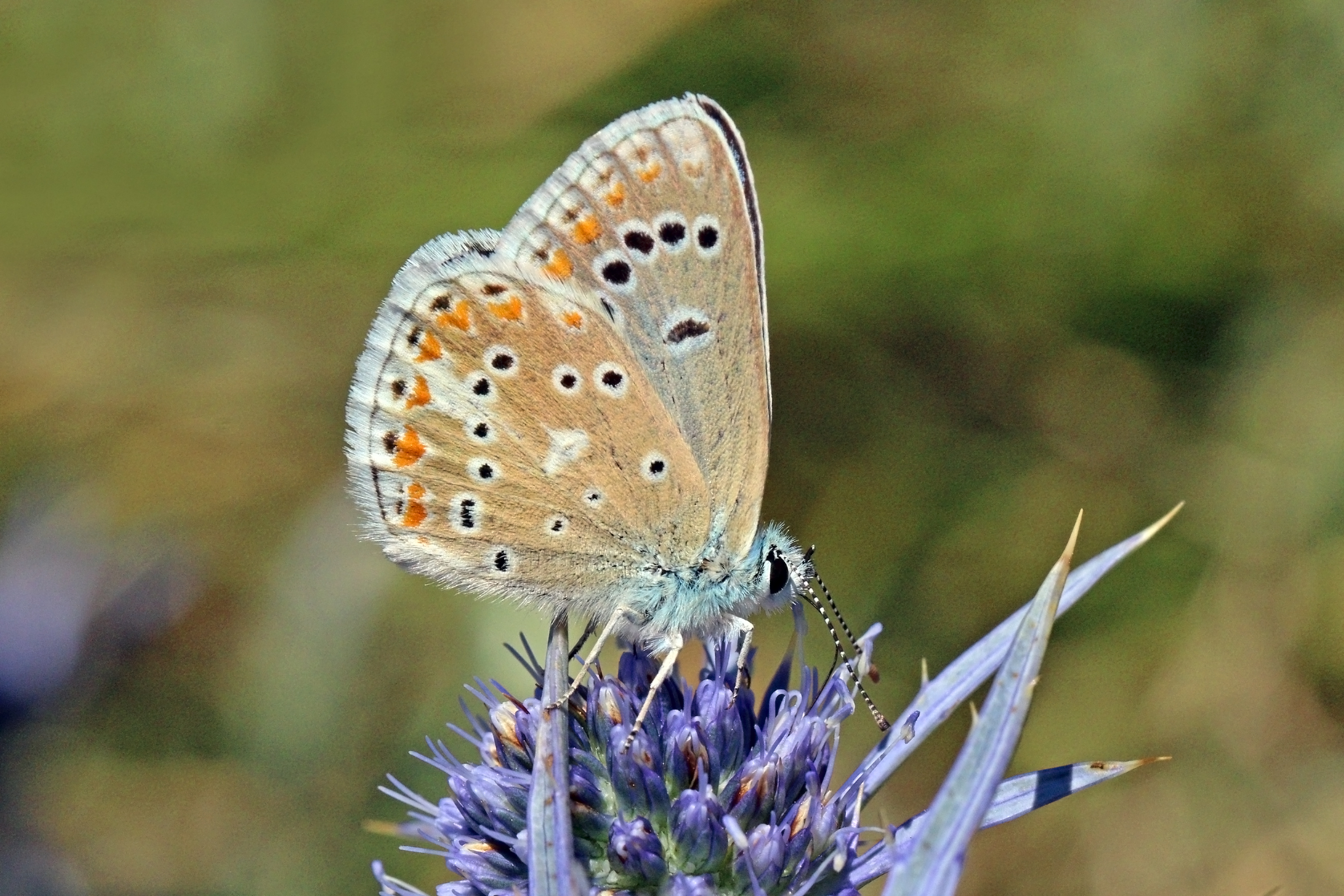
- both male P. d. magna, North Macedonia

Scientific classification
- Domain: Eukaryota
- Kingdom: Animalia
- Phylum: Arthropoda
- Class: Insecta
- Order: Lepidoptera
- Family: Lycaenidae
- Genus: Polyommatus
- Subgenus: Plebicula
- Species: P. dorylas

Binomial name
- Polyommatus dorylas ([Denis & Schiffermüller], 1775)

= Polyommatus dorylas =

Turquoise blue

Species of butterfly

Polyommatus (Plebicula) dorylas, the turquoise blue, is a butterfly of the family Lycaenidae. It is found in southern Europe, Asia Minor, the Ural Mountains, Caucasus and Transcaucasia. Its wingspan is 15–17 mm. The butterfly's common name comes from the dazzling bright blue colour of male's wings. The larvae feed on Anthyllis vulneraria (kidney vetch). The butterfly flies from May to September in two generations. Habitats include flowery meadows in rocky areas at 500–2000 m.

== Description in Seitz ==
L. hylas Esp. (= dorylas Hbn., argester Bgstr., thetis Esp. (female)) (80 i). Of the size of myrrhina [ Polyommatus myrrhina (Staudinger, 1901)]; male above of a very glossy and peculiar blue; the female often smaller than the male, black-brown, with or without reddish marginal spots. The underside is unmistakable, the ocelli being reduced to a very few so, that the white forewing is usually without markings from the base to the reddish yellow submarginal spots. Central and South Europe as far as Asia Minor, according to Sloper also obtained in England (at Dover). ab. obsoleta Gillm. (= glycera Schultz) are European specimens in which the sparse ocelli of the hindwing beneath are on the road of becoming obsolete. – There exists also a geographical race with obsolescent ocelli, which is distinguished by the fringes being longer and white above; this is armena Stgr. [ now P. d. armena (Staudinger, 1871) ] (81 a), from Asia Minor, of which identical specimens are said by Hormuzaki to occur also in the Bukovina. – Very conspicuous is ab. metallica Favre; this is the name for females whose upperside bears near the base of both wings or only on the forewing intensely bright metallic blue spots, whose glitter can be distinctly perceived even in the flying specimen and which gives the insect a very strange appearance, ab. nigropunctata Wheel, has black submarginal dots on the hindwing above. – nivescens Kef. (= albicans Dup. & Gerh.) [ now Polyommatus nivescens Keferstein, 1851 ](80 i) is a form flying in Spain on limestone. The upperside of the male is dull grey-violet with a white silky gloss, similar to dolus, menalcas and coridon albicans. – Larva very similar to that of icarus, dark green, with black head, blackish dorsal line and yellow side-stripe; at each side of the dorsal line yellowish smears. In May and again in August on Thymus, Trifolium, Melilotus, Medicago, etc. The butterflies are partial to limestone soil and sand, and their occurrence is therefore rather sporadic, but they are plentiful in many districts. They fly in May and again in July, and like to drink on damp places on roads.

Subspecies are:

- Polyommatus dorylas magna Bálint, 1985 (Eastern Carpathians, Romania)
- Polyommatus dorylas castilla (Fruhstorfer, 1910) (Spain)
- Polyommatus dorylas armenus (Staudinger, 1871) (Caucasus, Armenia)

== Etymology ==
Dorileus is a city in North Phrygia, a junction of roads to Pessinus, Iconium and Apamea.
