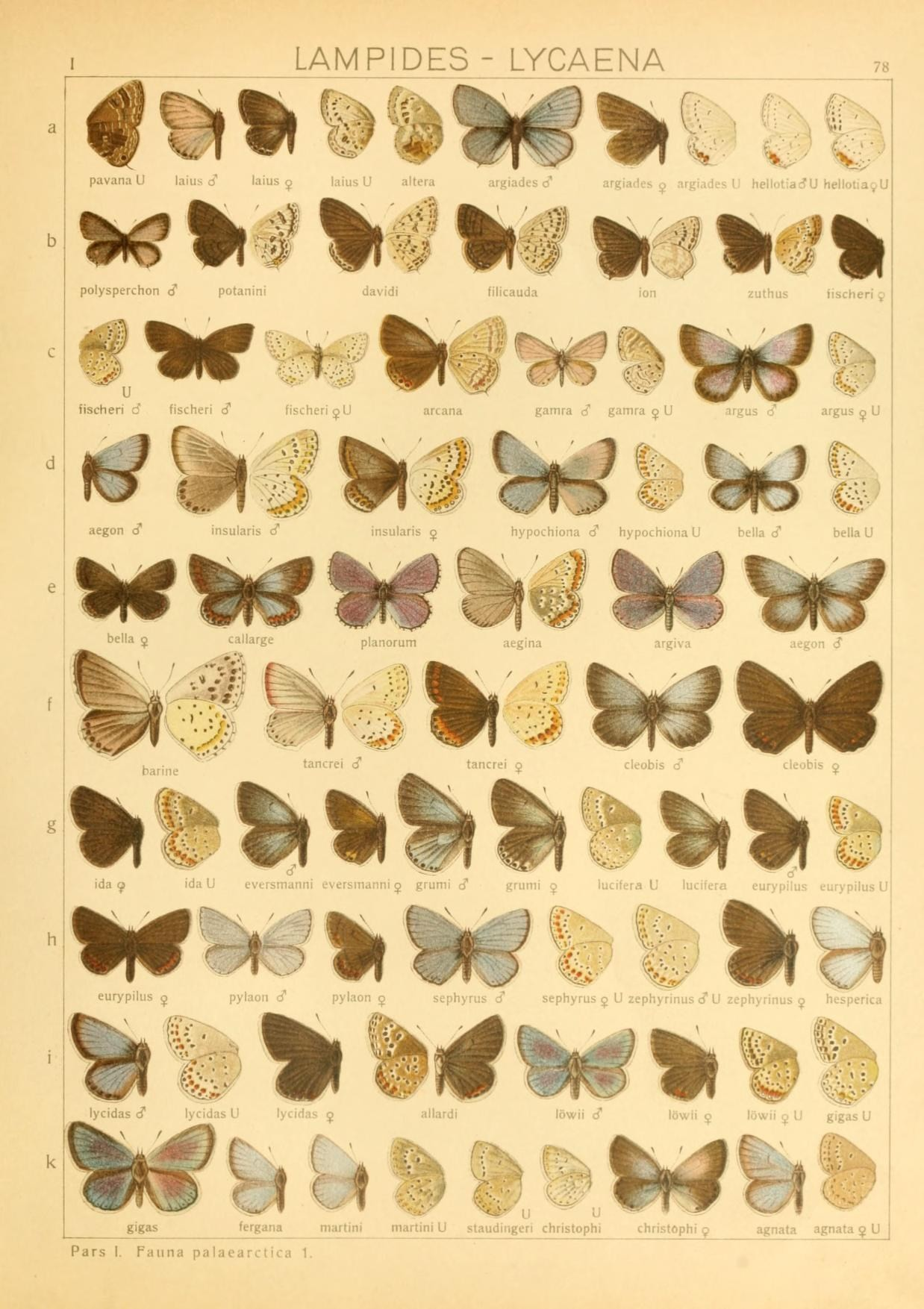
- Kretania hesperica in Seitz (78h)

Conservation status
- Vulnerable (IUCN 2.3)

Scientific classification
- Kingdom: Animalia
- Phylum: Arthropoda
- Class: Insecta
- Order: Lepidoptera
- Family: Lycaenidae
- Genus: Kretania
- Species: K. hesperica

Binomial name
- Kretania hesperica (Rambur, 1839)

Synonyms
- Lycaena hesperica Rambur, 1840; Plebejus hesperica; Plebejus hespericus; Plebejus pylaon hespericus

= Kretania hesperica =

Species of butterfly

Kretania hesperica, the Spanish zephyr blue, is a species of butterfly in the family Lycaenidae. It is endemic to Spain. Its natural habitats are temperate shrubland and temperate grassland. It is threatened by habitat loss. Seitz describes it (as a race of L. sephyrus Friv.) thus - hesperica Rbr. (78 h) is above sky-blue instead of violet-blue; from Spain.
