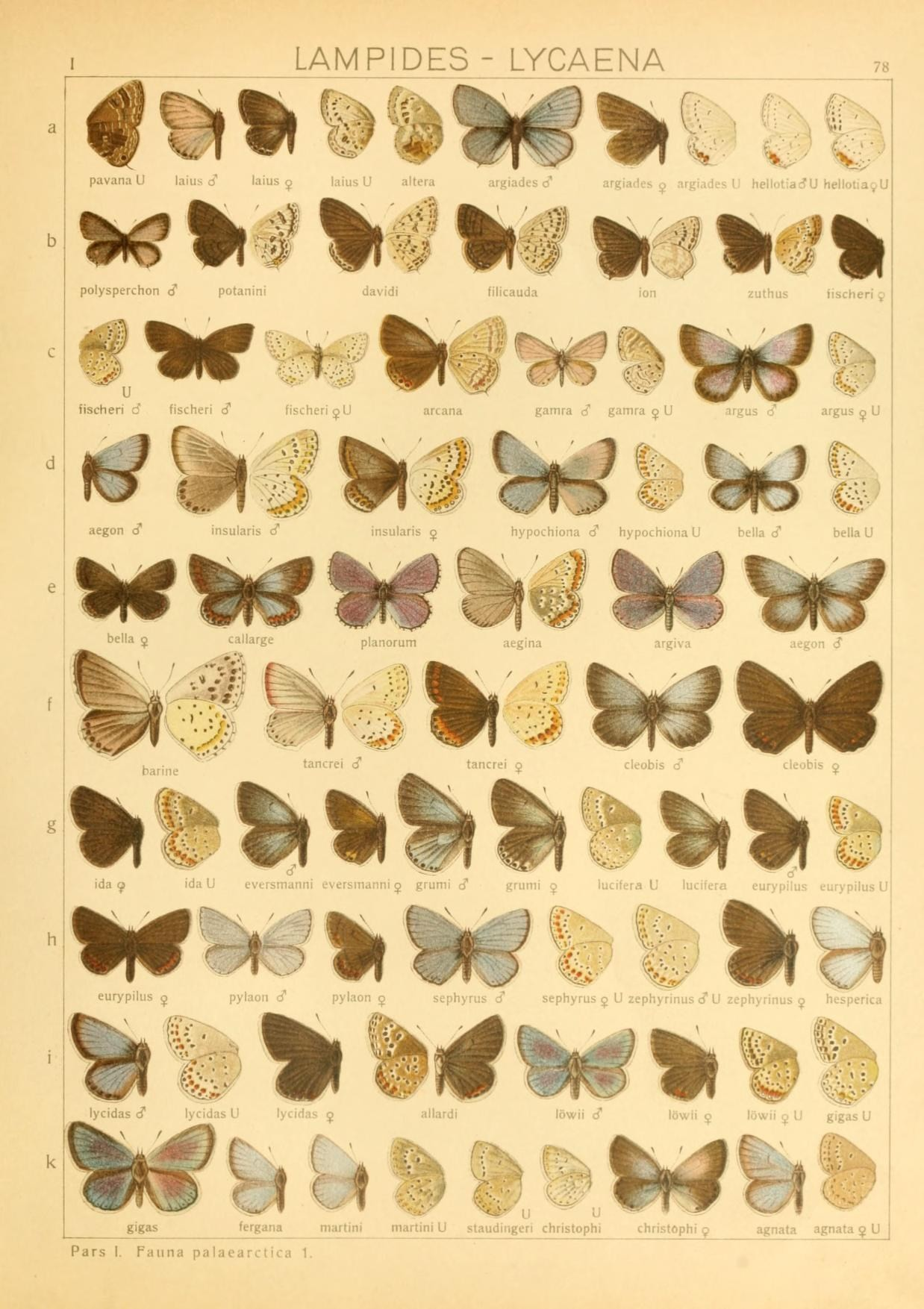
- 78i as lycidas Trapp, 1863

Conservation status
- Near Threatened (IUCN 3.1)

Scientific classification
- Kingdom: Animalia
- Phylum: Arthropoda
- Class: Insecta
- Order: Lepidoptera
- Family: Lycaenidae
- Genus: Kretania
- Species: K. trappi

Binomial name
- Kretania trappi (Verity, 1927)

Synonyms
- Plebeius trappi Verity, 1927; Plebejus trappi; Plebejus pylaon trappi; Lycaena lycidas Trapp, 1863

= Kretania trappi =

Species of butterfly

The Alpine zephyr blue (Kretania trappi) is a species of butterfly in the family Lycaenidae. It is found in Italy and Switzerland. Its natural habitats are temperate forests and temperate grassland. It is threatened by habitat loss.

== Sources ==
- van Swaay, C.; Wynhoff, I.; Verovnik, R.; Wiemers, M.; López Munguira, M.; Maes, D.; Sasic, M.; Verstrael, T.; Warren, M.; Settele, J. (2010). "Plebejus trappi". IUCN Red List of Threatened Species. 2010 e.T39488A10230047. doi:10.2305/IUCN.UK.2010-1.RLTS.T39488A10230047.en.
