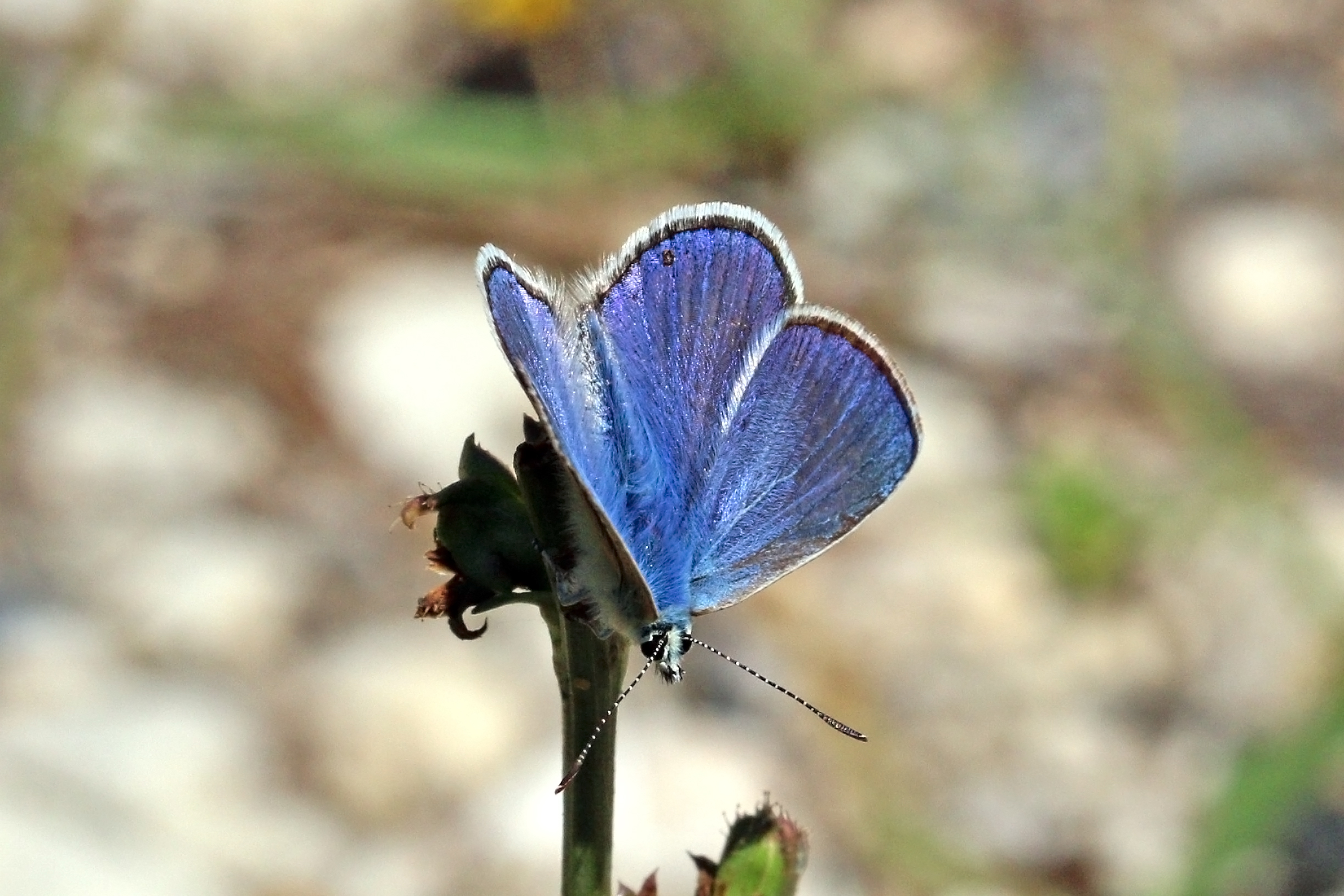
- male, Bulgaria
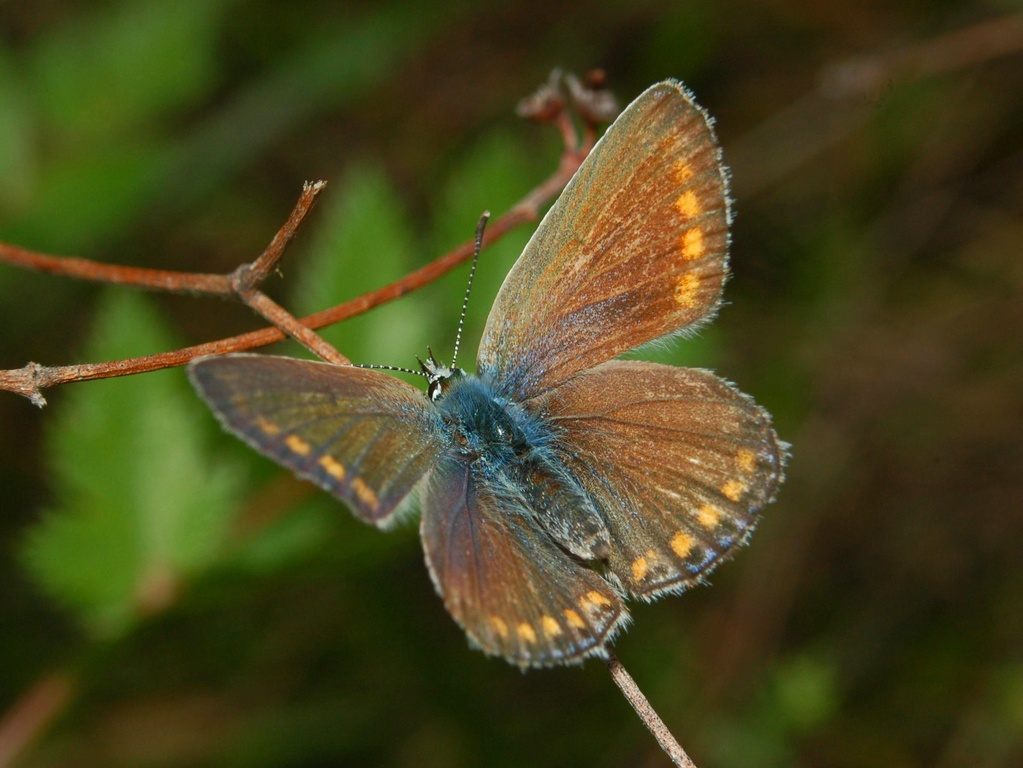
- female, Genova, Italy

Scientific classification
- Kingdom: Animalia
- Phylum: Arthropoda
- Class: Insecta
- Order: Lepidoptera
- Family: Lycaenidae
- Genus: Polyommatus
- Species: P. thersites

Binomial name
- Polyommatus thersites Cantener, 1835

= Polyommatus thersites =

Chapman's blue

Species of butterfly

Polyommatus thersites, the Chapman's blue, is a butterfly in the family Lycaenidae. It is found in southern Europe, Morocco, Lebanon, Asia Minor, Iran and across the Palearctic to Siberia and Tian Shan.

It is a small butterfly with both generation dimorphism and sexual dimorphism. For the first generation the upperside is blue with grey hind-wings and in the female a sub-marginal line of orange spots. The summer generation of the female is brown with the same sub-marginal line of orange spots while they are absent in the lighter male.

Representatives of both sexes have in the spring generation grey-colored hindwing undersides while (sandy brown in the summer generation).

The underside is ochre marked with black dots circled in white and decorated with a sub-marginal line of orange spots. The forewing underside is yellow grey in summer females.

Polyommatus thersites is similar to Polyommatus icarus, but they are smaller and both sexes have no basal spots on the underside of the forewing .

The larva feeds on Onobrychis species (O. arenaria, O. peduncularis, O. sativa and O. viciifolia)

== Subspecies ==
Two subspecies are recognized:

- P. t. thersites (Europe, south-western Siberia, Caucasus, Armenia, Talysh Mountains, Kopet Dag)
- P. t. orientis (Sheljuzhko, 1928) (Alay Mountains, northern Tian Shan, Dzhungarsky Alatau, Altai, Sayan)
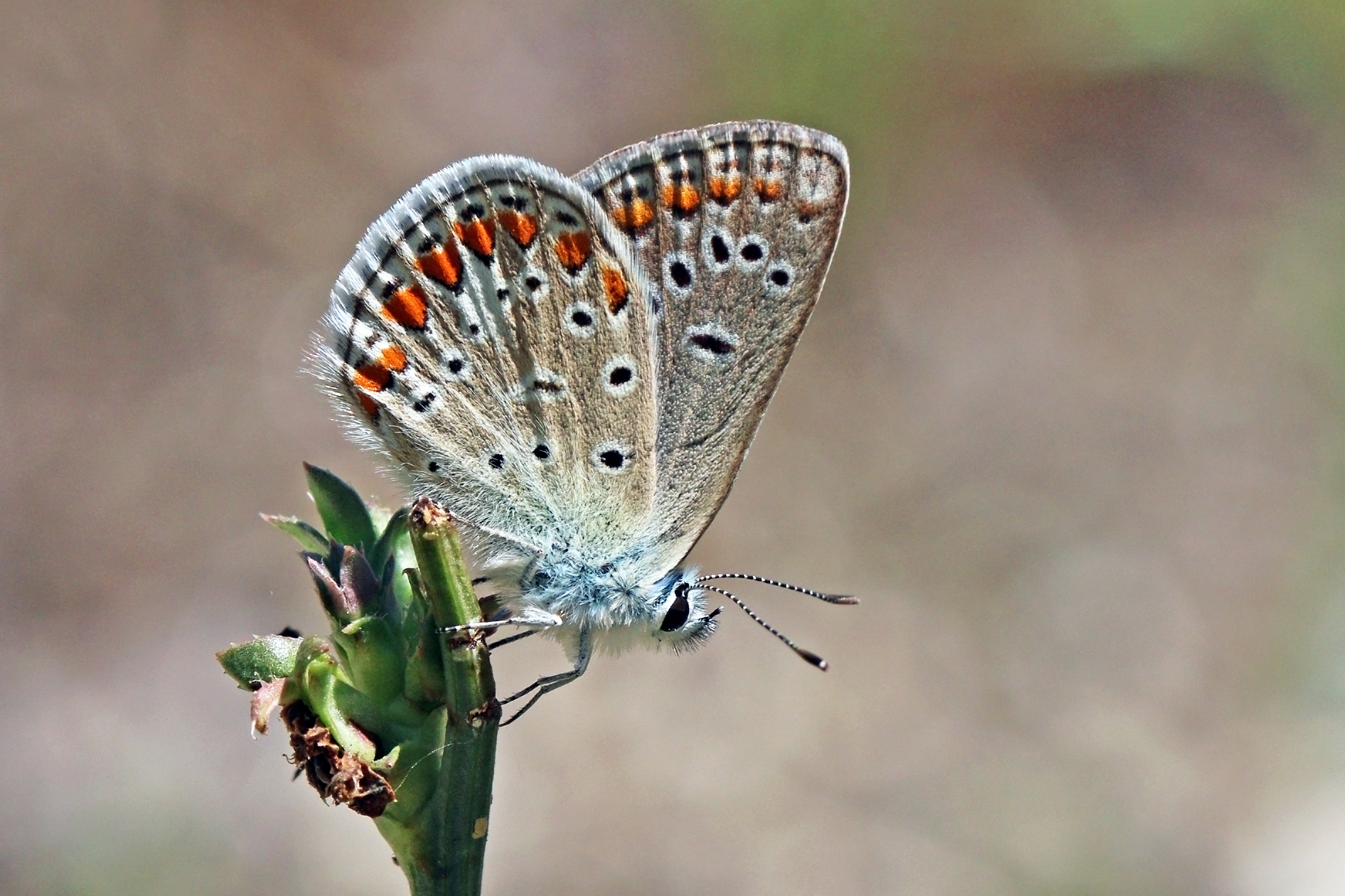
male, Bulgaria

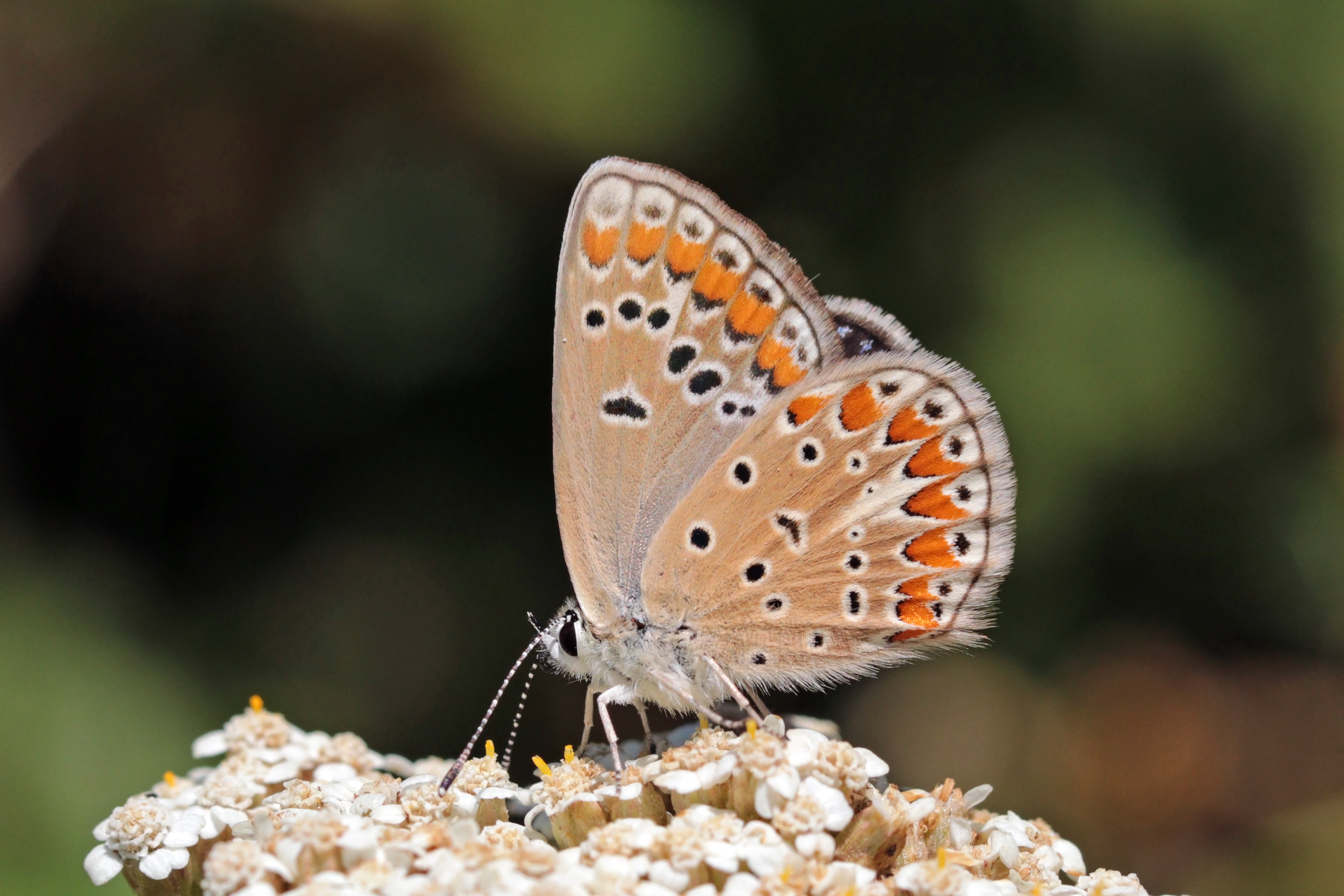
female, Italy

== Bibliography ==
- Koren, Toni; Lauš, Boris; Šašić, Martina; Mihoci, Iva; Štih, Ana; Bralić, Petra; Gomboc, Stanislav (2017-12-31). "Contribution to the Knowledge of the Butterfly Fauna (Lepidoptera: Papilionoidea) of Hrvatsko Zagorje, Croatia". Natura Croatica: Periodicum Musei Historiae Naturalis Croatici. 26 (2): 167–196. doi:10.20302/NC.2017.26.15. eISSN 1848-7386.
