= Polyommatus damon meinsii =

Scientific classification
- Kingdom: Animalia
- Phylum: Arthropoda
- Class: Insecta
- Order: Lepidoptera
- Family: Lycaenidae
- Genus: Polyommatus
- Species: P. damon
- Subspecies: P. d. meinsii

Trinomial name
- Polyommatus damon meinsii (Gómez-Bustillo, 1971)

Synonyms
- Plebejus damon meinsii Gómez-Bustillo, 1971

Subspecies of butterfly

Polyommatus damon meinsii, the meinsii, is a butterfly subspecies of Polyommatus damon in the family Lycaenidae. It was discovered in 1971 by the German engineer Horst Meins Rugenstein and Dr. Miguel R. Gomez-Bustillo, who published it in Mariposas de la Peninsula Ibérica, Ropaloceros (II) in 1974.

== Description ==
Meinsii has bigger individuals with longer wings than the subspecies Noguerae and Cabrerae. The male's front wings have bright blue scaling, turning gradually black at its outer margins, which are almost twice the width of the original species, Polyommatus damon. Their back wings are cream-grayish colored, with a white line as well as spots that are encircled by white rings. However, the females back wings are darker. Its caterpillar eats Medicago sativa (alfalfa), Medicago lupulina, Medicago media, Medicago arborea, and Lupinus albus (lupin). The Meinsii winters as a larva.

== Range ==
The meinsii is located in the area of Castejón de Sos (900–1000 m), Province of Huesca, which is in the central Pyrenees of Spain. They usually live during July and August in mountain sides that are protected from the wind at a height between 800 m and 2000 m.
