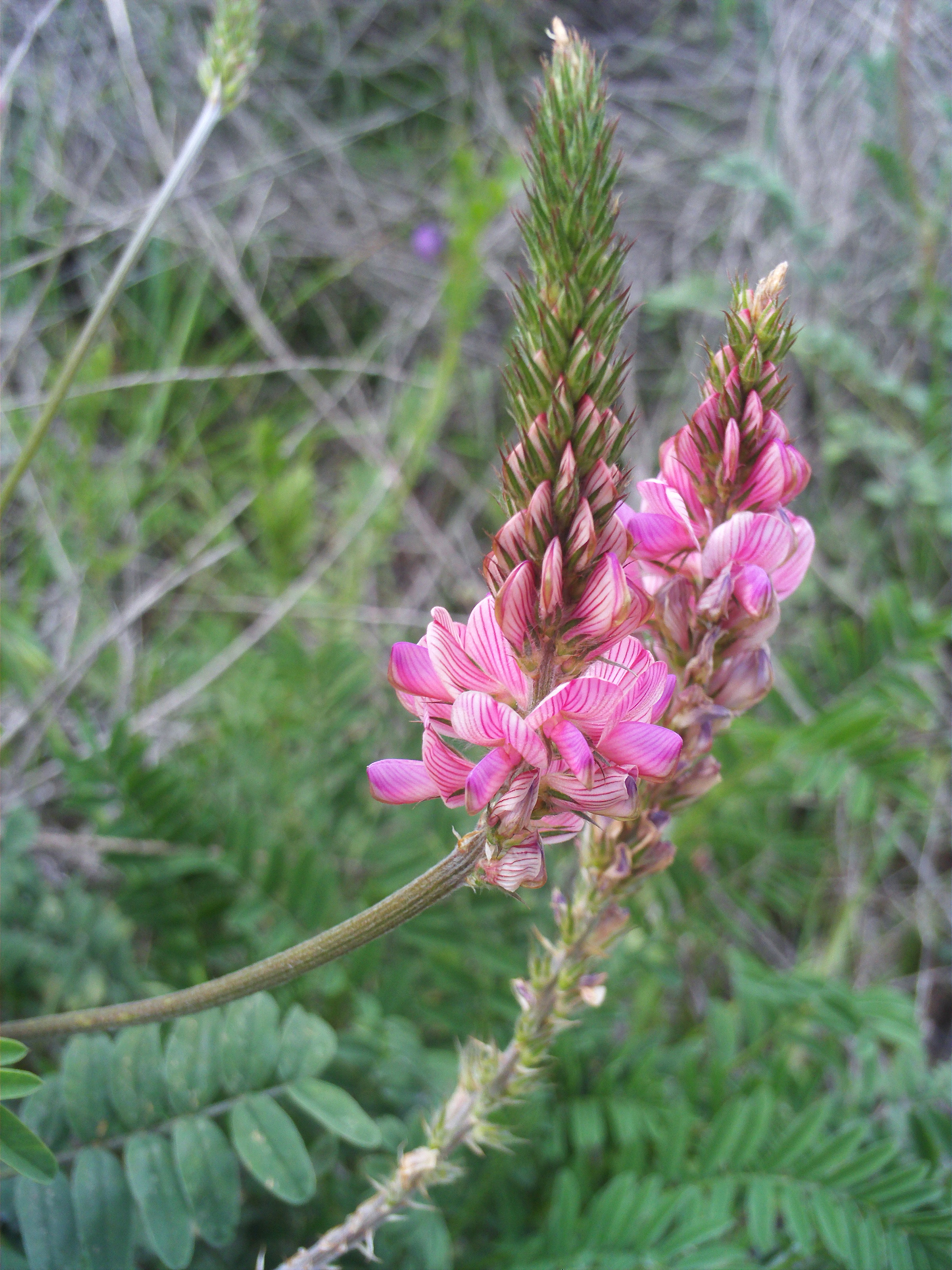

Scientific classification
- Kingdom: Plantae
- Clade: Embryophytes
- Clade: Tracheophytes
- Clade: Spermatophytes
- Clade: Angiosperms
- Clade: Eudicots
- Clade: Rosids
- Order: Fabales
- Family: Fabaceae
- Subfamily: Faboideae
- Genus: Onobrychis
- Species: O. viciifolia

Binomial name
- Onobrychis viciifolia Scop.

Synonyms
- List: Hedysarum collinum Salisb. (1796); Hedysarum echinatum Gilib. (1782); Hedysarum montanum Pers. (1807); Hedysarum onobrychioides Winkl. (1877); Hedysarum onobrychis L. (1753); Hedysarum onobrychis var. canone S.L.Welsh (1978); Onobrychis alba Boreau (1857); Onobrychis bifera (Alef.) Coulot & Rabaute (2020); Onobrychis collina Jord. (1851); Onobrychis esponellae Sennen (1936); Onobrychis glabra Desv. (1814); Onobrychis incana Gueldenst. (1791); Onobrychis onobrychis (L.) H.Karst. (1886); Onobrychis pallens Láng ex Neilr. (1865); Onobrychis pallescens Schur (1877); Onobrychis procumbens Fisch. ex Schrank (1822); Onobrychis sativa Lam. (1779)

= Onobrychis viciifolia =

Common sainfoin

Plant species in the pea family

Onobrychis viciifolia, also known as O. sativa or common sainfoin (/ˈsænfɔɪn/) was an important forage legume in temperate regions until the 1950s. During the Green Revolution it was replaced by high yielding alfalfa and clover species. Due to its anthelmintic properties, common sainfoin is a natural alternative to drugs to control nematode parasitism in the guts of small ruminants. This is the main reason why O. viciifolia returned to the scientific agenda in recent years.

== Biological, ecological and biochemical properties ==
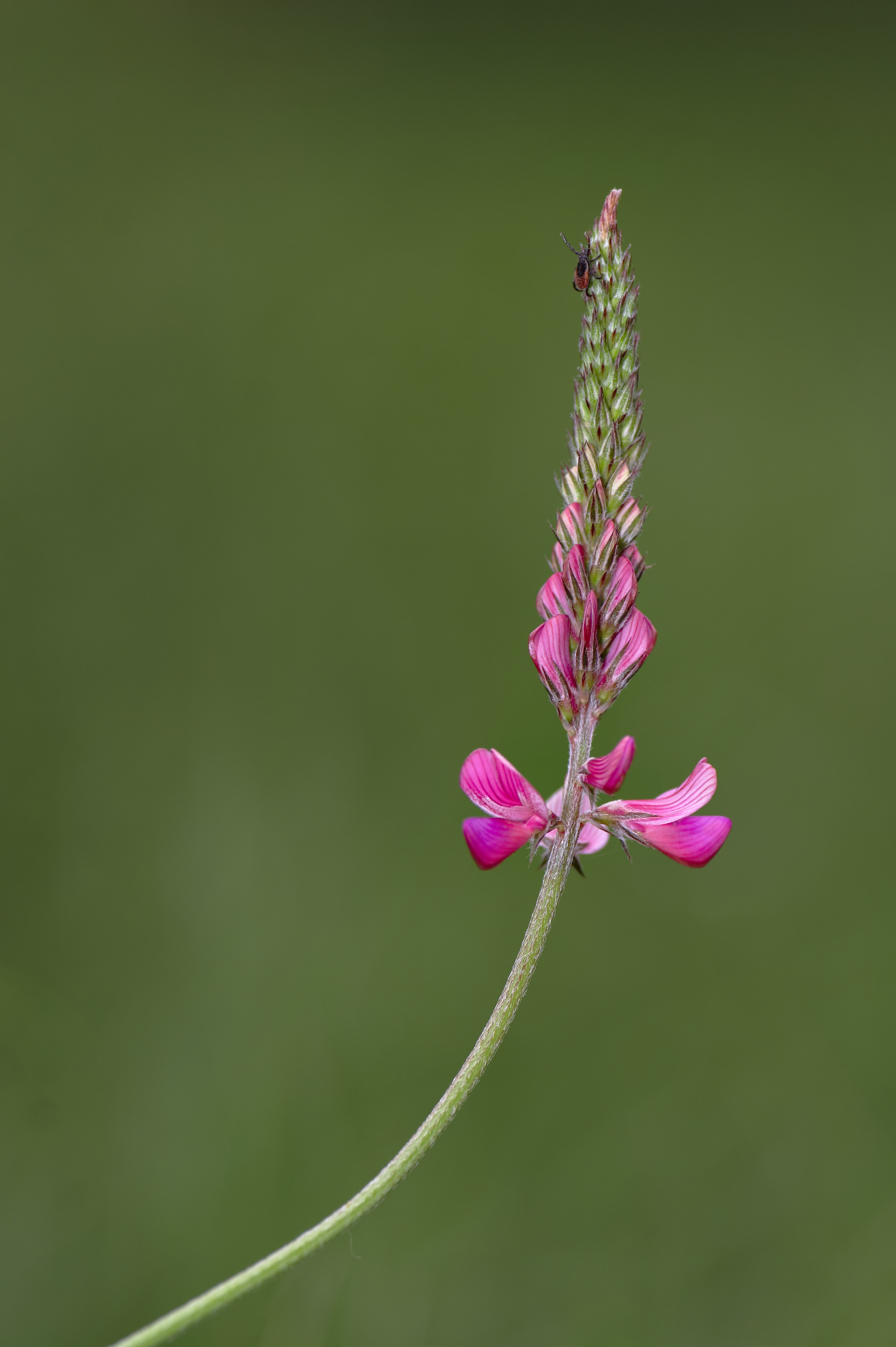
Onobrychis viciifolia and Ixodes scapularis (deer tick)

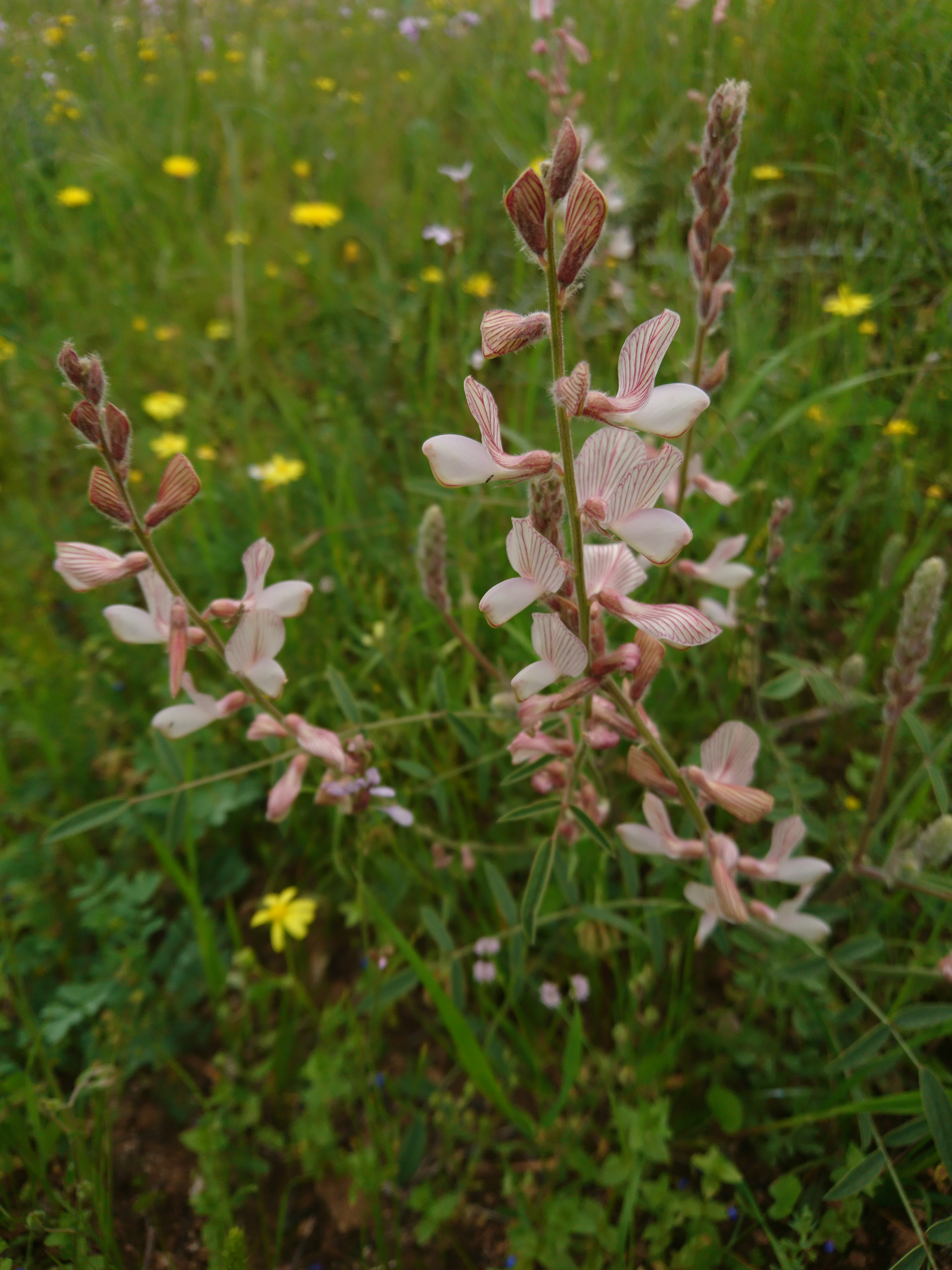
Wild Onobrychis viciifolia in Behbahan

The genus Onobrychis comprises 54 different species of which O. viciifolia is of greatest agronomic importance. Two different agricultural types of O. viciifolia are known. The single-cut type is characterized by a vegetative regrowth after cutting and its origin is in Europe. A generative regrowth after cutting is typical for the second or the double-cut type. Originated in the Middle East the double-cut type grows larger than the single-cut type. Compared to other forage legumes both types are weak in competition and their regrowth after mowing is considered to be low. Also the yields of common sainfoin are significantly lower than those of alfalfa and clover.

In terms of symbiotic nitrogen fixation from the atmosphere, common sainfoin is not as specific as other legumes. A relatively broad range of rhizobia genera is able to colonize the roots of O. viciifolia. The common sainfoin is an open pollinating plant, mainly pollinated by nectar feeding insects. Therefore, O. viciifolia is a promising crop to enhance biodiversity within agro-ecosystems. This pollination biology leads to certain difficulties in breeding programs resulting in a low number of registered cultivars. The leaves of common sainfoin contain high levels of condensed tannins. This content can be more than five times higher than in clover species or alfalfa .

== Beneficial aspects in animal production ==
An animal diet containing common sainfoin is able to reduce nematode (e.g. Haemonchus contortus) parasitism in ruminant’s guts. Due to the high levels of condensed tannins, the fecundity of nematodes and the number of their eggs in the ruminant’s digestive system are reduced. Especially in goat and sheep production systems feeding of O. viciifolia is a promising alternative or complement to synthetic drugs. Besides these anthelmintic properties diets containing common sainfoin can lead to increasing daily weight gains of small ruminants. Also milk quantity and quality of these animals are not negatively affected by O. viciifolia intake. Furthermore, various studies showed that the voluntary intake of sainfoin was comparable or even higher than the intake of alfalfa or clover species.

== Cultivation of O. viciifolia ==
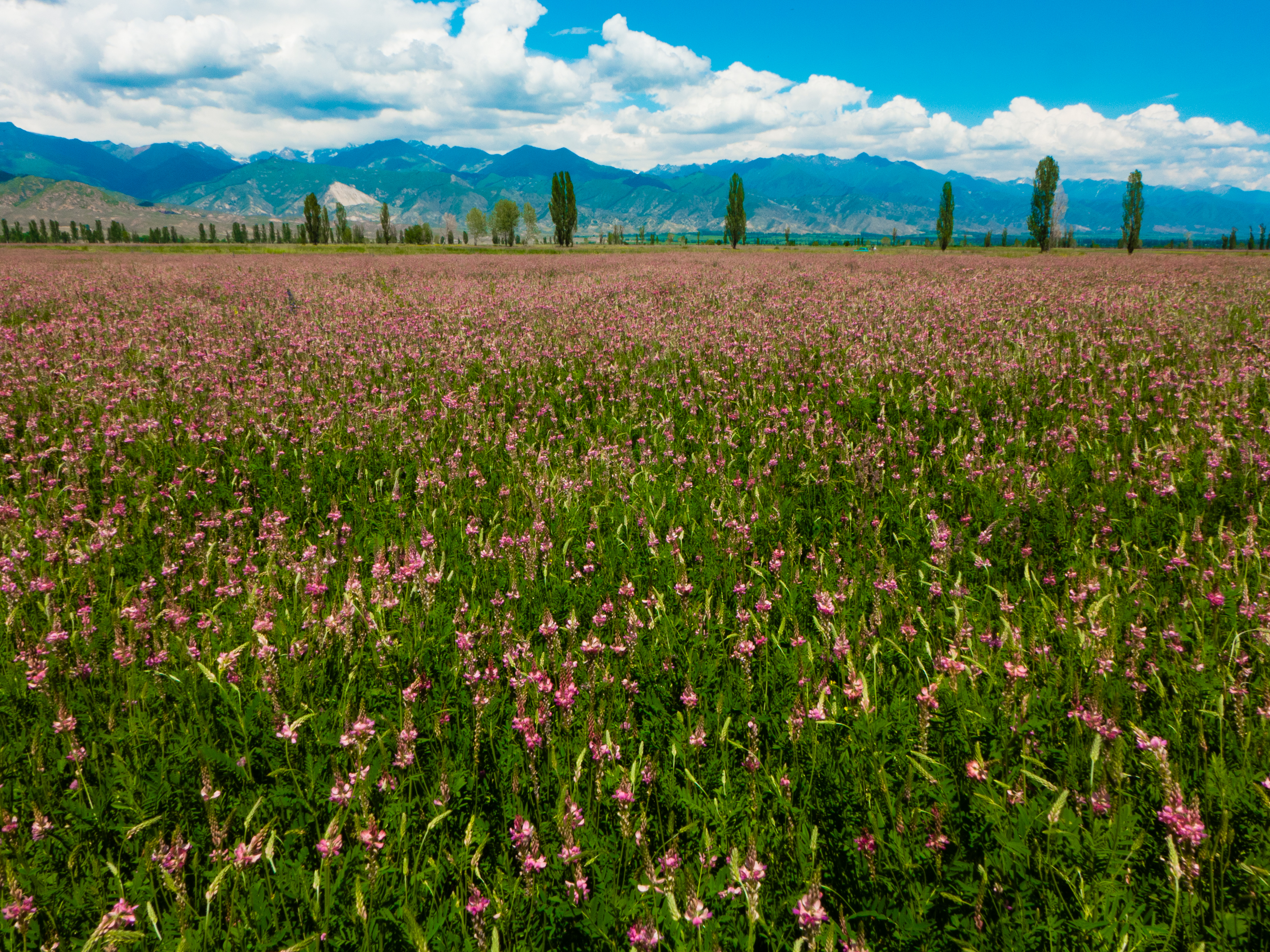
O. viciifolia in a field

To reach high levels of condensed tannins common sainfoin should be sown in pure culture. Due to its low competitiveness, weed infestation has to be controlled, especially in the first year. Normally fertilizer applications are not needed to reach satisfying yields. Nevertheless, slurry or phosphate applications can promote initial growth. Pests and diseases are almost never a serious problem. Frost and drought tolerance of common sainfoin is higher than in other forage legumes such as alfalfa or different clover species. In contrast, O. viciifolia is much more intolerant to water logging than other forage legumes. Therefore, clayey soils with a bad drainage should be avoided. Also acidic soils are not appropriate for the cultivation of common sainfoin.

Seedbed preparation and sowing procedure are done in a similar manner and with the same machinery as for cereal cultivation. Around 800 seeds per square meter should be sown on a weed free seedbed between spring and late summer. In the year of establishment common sainfoin can be cut twice a year. Afterwards up to four cuts per growing season are possible. Careful mowing is important to minimize disintegration losses. Common sainfoin can be stored and fed to animals in the form of hay, pellets or silage.
