= Louis Prosper Cantener =

Louis Prosper Cantener (1803 – 30 March 1847 in Hyères) was a French entomologist who specialized in Coleoptera and Lepidoptera.

He wrote Catalogue des Lépidoptères du département du Var. Rev. Ent. 1 (1) : 69-94 (1833) and Histoire naturelle des Lepidopteres Rhopaloceres, ou Papillons, Diurnes, des departements des haut et Bas-Rhin, de la Moselle, de la Meurthe, et des Vosges. L. P. Cantener. Roret et Levrault. Paris. (1834-) Louis Cantener was a Member of the Société entomologique de France.
