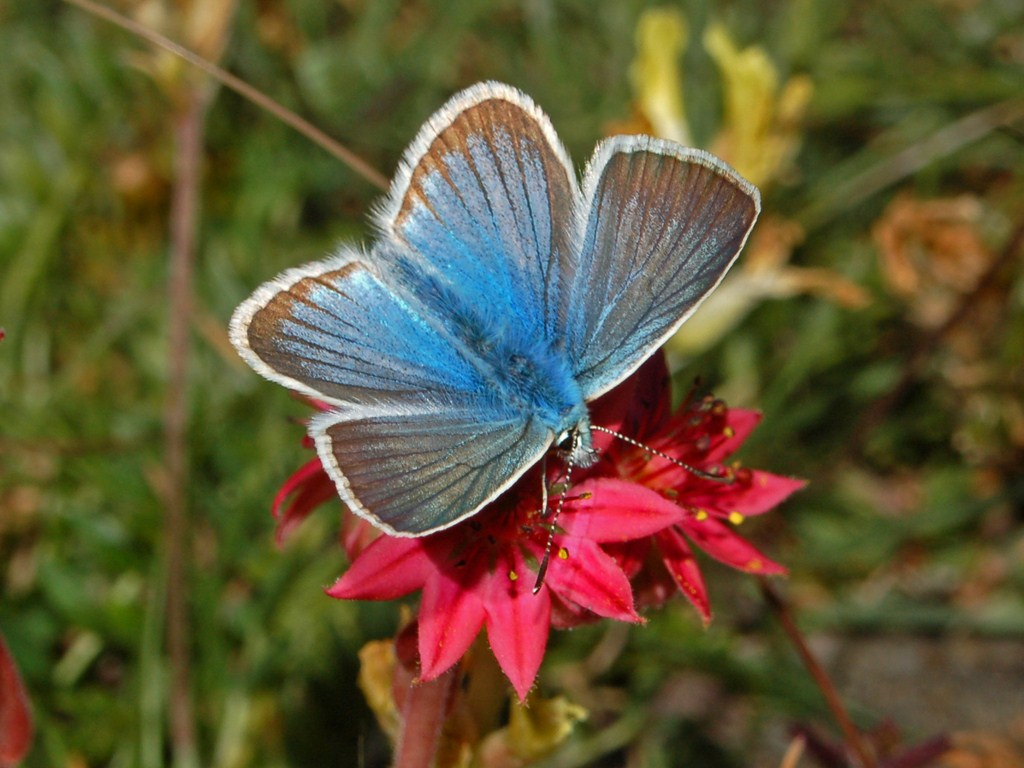
- Polyommatus damon. Male, upperface
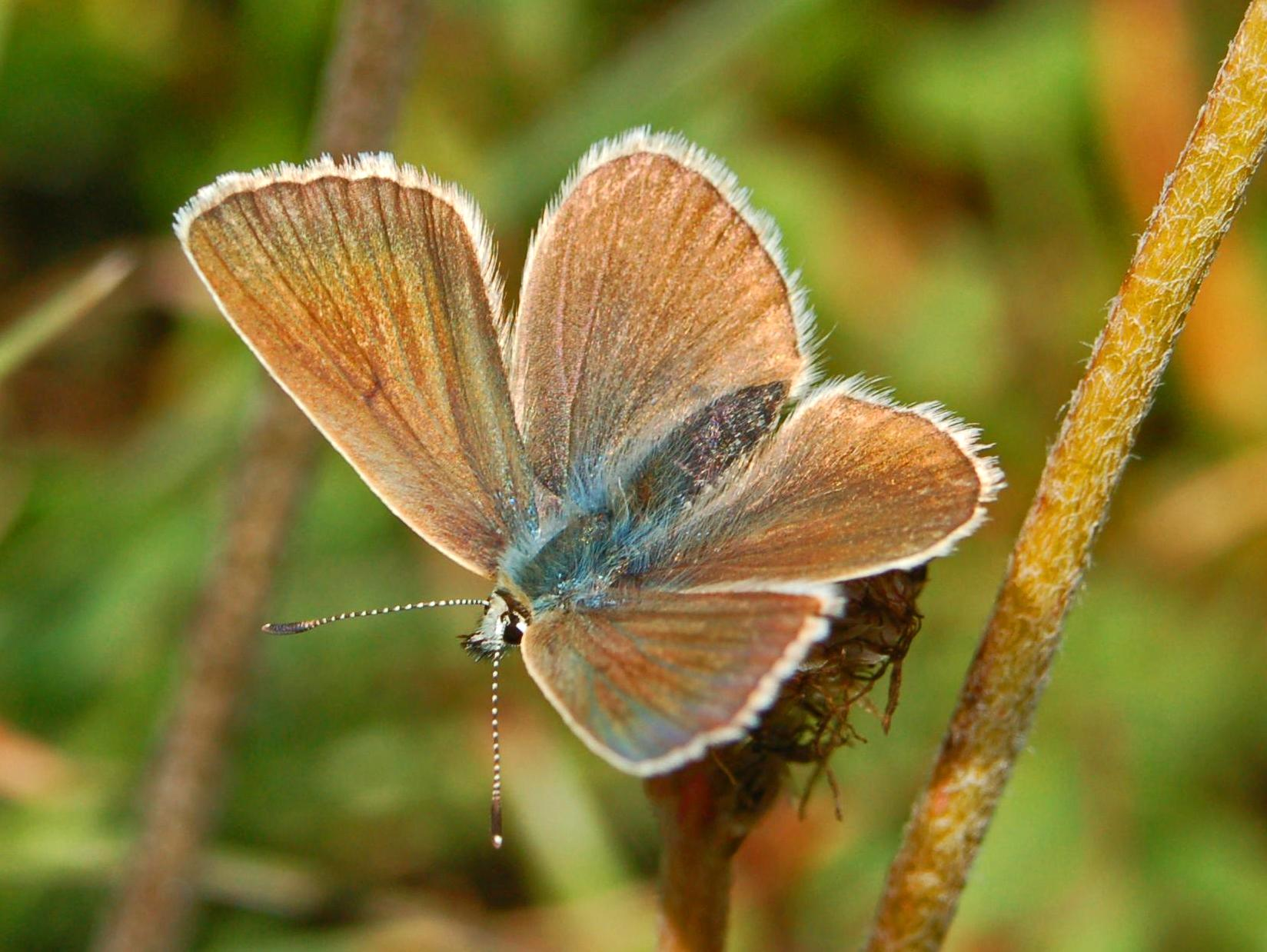
- Polyommatus damon. Female, upperface

Scientific classification
- Kingdom: Animalia
- Phylum: Arthropoda
- Clade: Pancrustacea
- Class: Insecta
- Order: Lepidoptera
- Family: Lycaenidae
- Genus: Polyommatus
- Species: P. damon

Binomial name
- Polyommatus damon Denis & Schiffermüller, 1775

Synonyms
- Agrodiatus damon; Lycaena damon

= Polyommatus damon =

Species of butterfly

Polyommatus damon, the Damon blue, is a butterfly of the family Lycaenidae.

== Subspecies ==
Subspecies include:

- Polyommatus damon damon – (Central and Southern Europe)
- Polyommatus damon kotshubeji (Sovinsky, 1915) – (Transcaucasia)
- Polyommatus damon merzbacheri (Courvoisier, 1913) – (Dzungarian Alatau Mountains)
- Polyommatus damon mongolensis (Koçak, 1980) – (Mongolia, South Siberia, Altai Mountains)
- Polyommatus damon noguerae (De Sagarra, 1924) – (Central and Northern Spain)
- Polyommatus damon ultramarina (Schawerda, 1924) – (Alps)
- Polyommatus damon zhicharevi (Sovinsky, 1915) – (North Caucasus, South East Europe)

== Distribution and habitat ==
The Damon blue can be found in Central and Southern Europe (central Spain, Pyrenees, Alps, Balkans and the Carpathians) and across the Palearctic to Siberia, Mongolia and the Altai Mountains This mountain species inhabits dry bushy or light woodlands and open grassy places at an elevation of 990–2,100 metres (3,250–6,890 ft) above sea level.

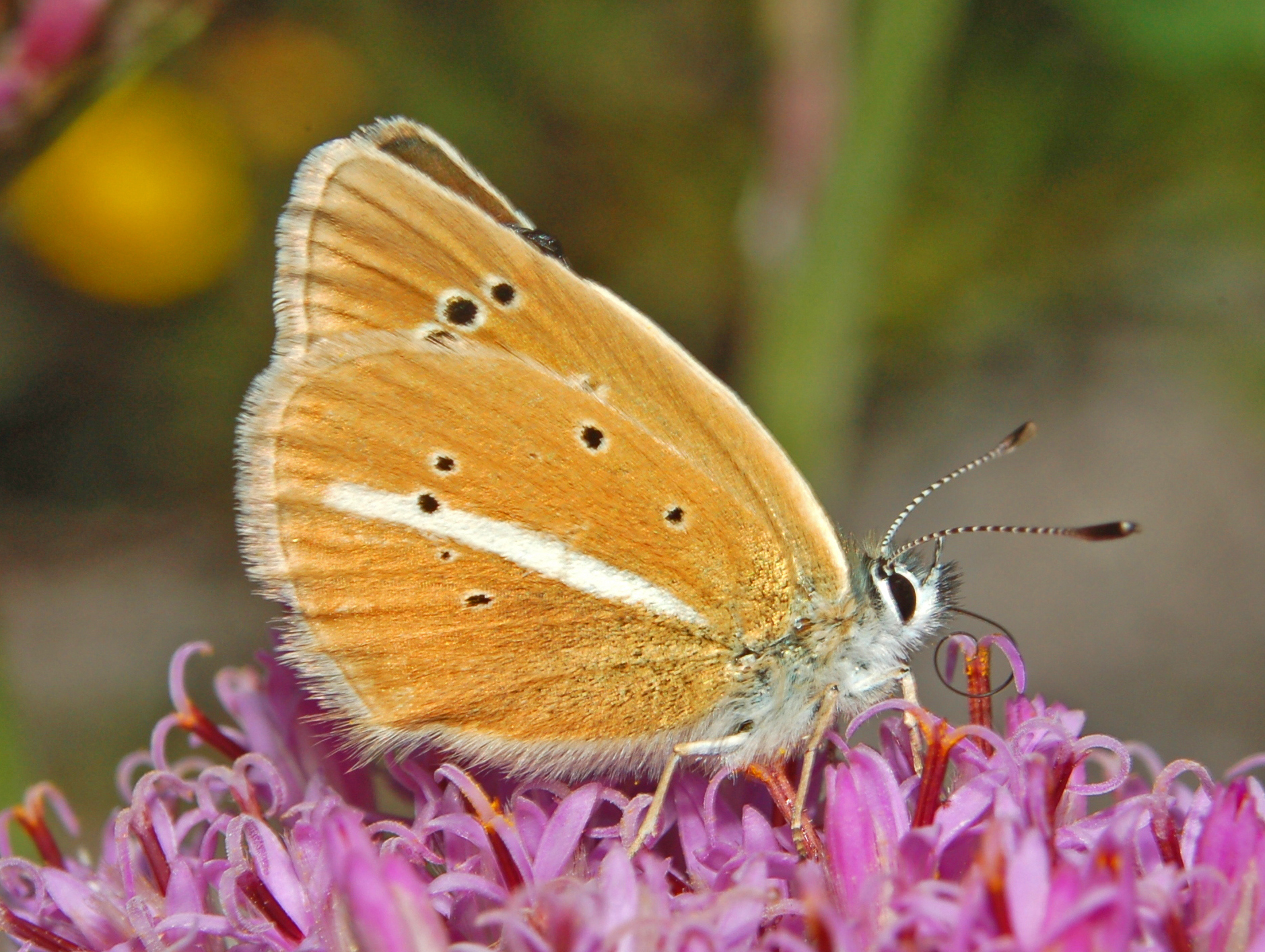
Polyommatus damon. Female, underface

== Description ==
Polyommatus damon has a wingspan of 20–34 mm. These small butterflies present a sexual dimorphism. The upperside of the wings is shining blue in males, with broad black borders and prominent veins. The upperside of the wings is brown in females. The underface of wings is ocher or pale grey-brown with a series of brown-black spots surrounded by white. Hindwings shows a white streak in both sexes. Both sexes have also a white fringe.

== Description in Seitz ==
L. damon Schiff. (= biton Sulz.) (81 h). -male large, brilliant shy-blue with a greenish tinge, the margin broadly black, the bright brown underside with or without ocelli, but always with a sharply marked white mesial streak. Female dark brown, above sometimes without traces of reddish submarginal spots. Central and South Europe, throughout Anterior and Central Asia as far as the Tian-shan. – Specimens entirely without ocelli on the hindwing beneath are ab. gillmeri Krod. (= caeca Aign.) while individuals with the ocelli distorted into oval spots or streaks, produced by Krodel by low temperature, are ab. extensa Krod. In ab. agraphomaena Verity the white streak of the underside is obsolescent, while ab. ferreti Farre is a dwarfed form of the male with narrow border on the upperside. – Larva greenish yellow, finely and densely hairy, alternately striped with paler and darker green, the head being brownish and the side-line darker or paler ydlow; until June on Esparset. The ants are so much after it that the presence of some larvae in a breeding cage in a room is sufficient to bring into the house whole crowds of ants, which gather about the cages, sometimes as many as ten ants being found on one larva. Pupa ochreous, above greenish, darker along the back. The butterflies occur in July and August on fields of Sainfoin and do not venture far away from them. They are plentiful where they occur.

== Biology ==
The butterfly flies from June to August. The larvae feed on Onobrychis species and Medicago falcata. Larvae are attended by ants (Lasius niger, Lasius alienus, Formica pratensis).

== Etymology ==
Named in the Classical tradition. Damon is a Pythagorean from Syracuse, whose history of relations with Phintias served as the plot of a number of poetic works.

== Gallery ==
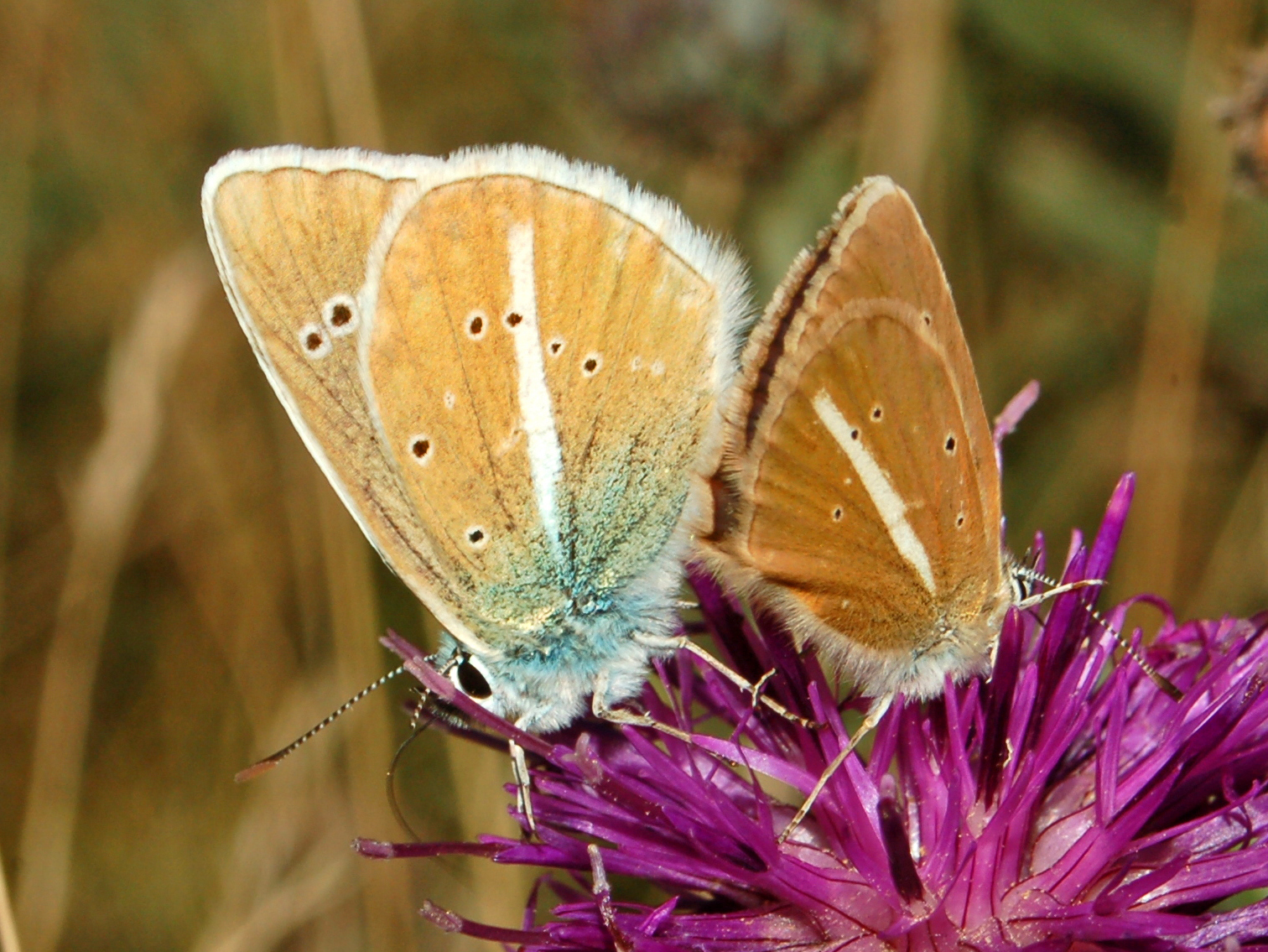
Mating pair

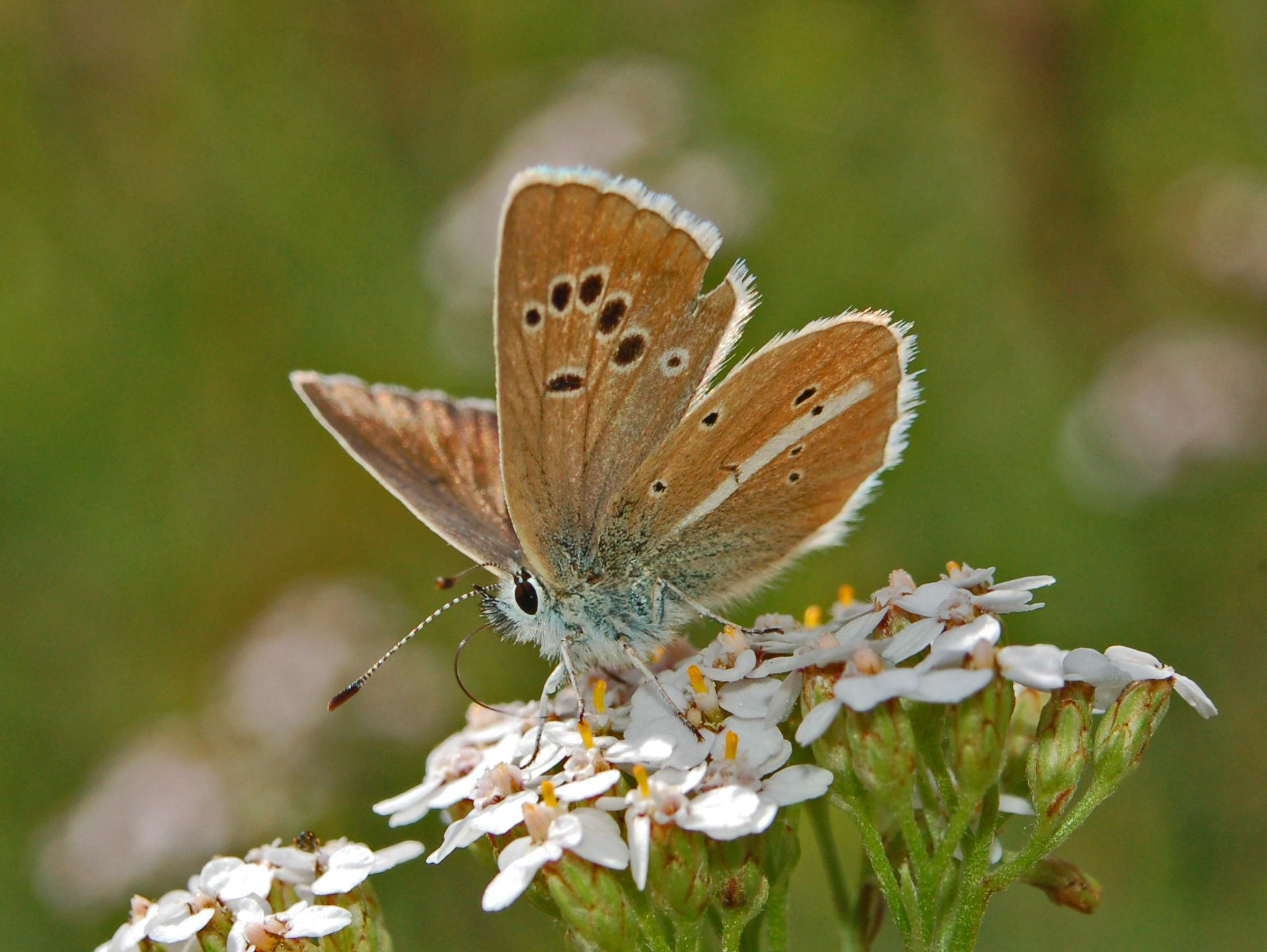
Female, underface

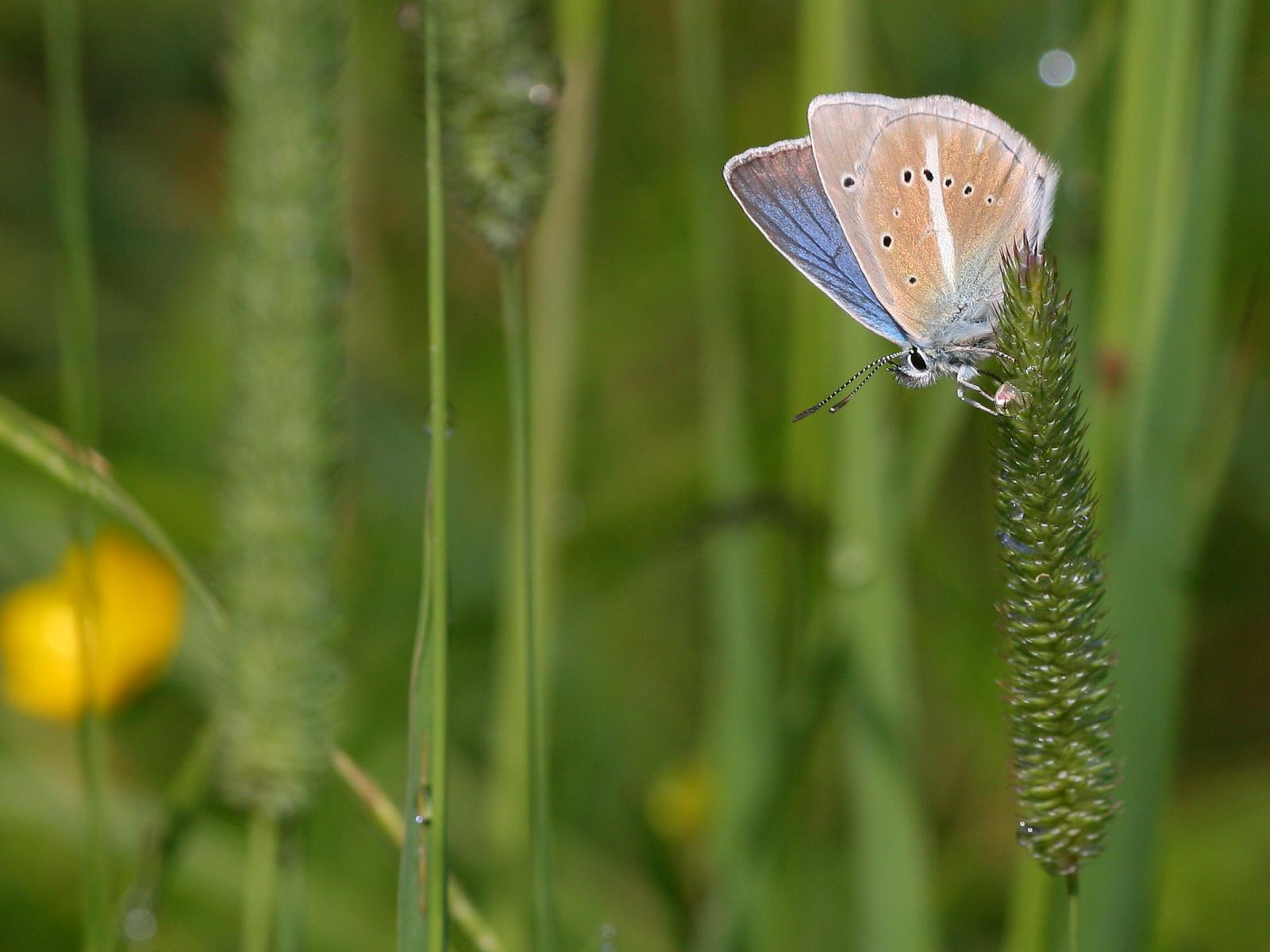
Male, underface

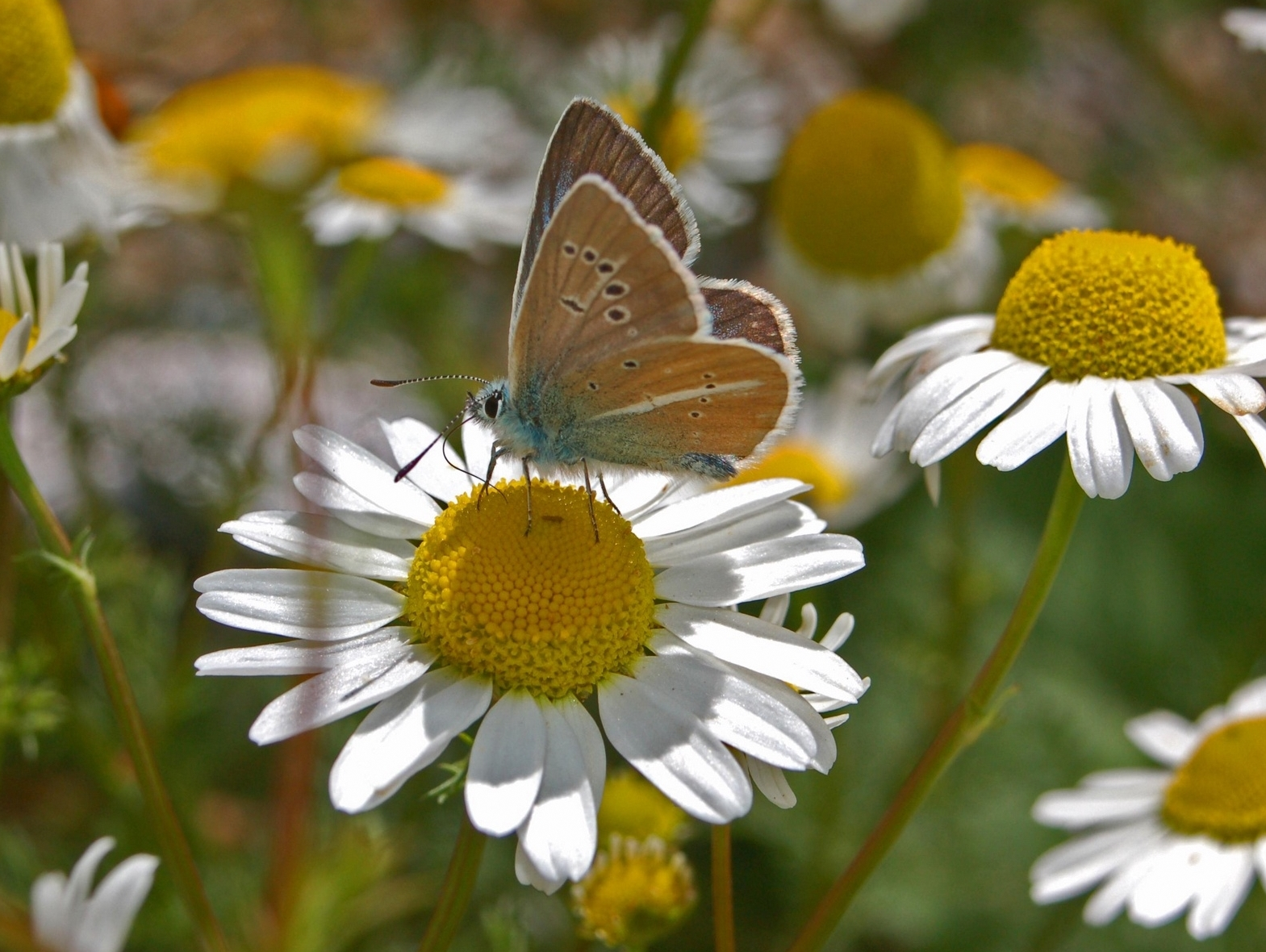
Feeding on nectar
