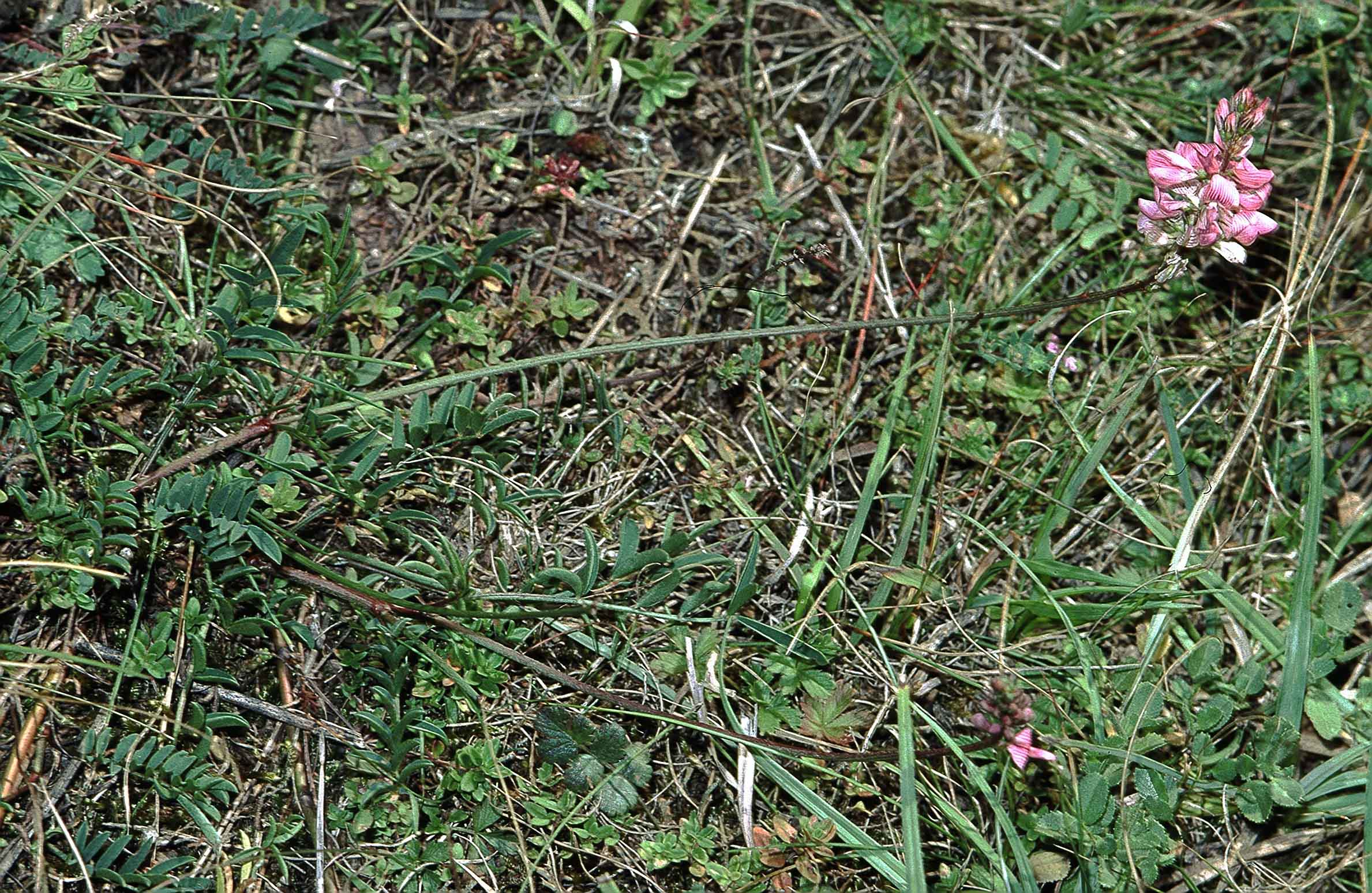
- Flowering Onobrychis arenaria

Scientific classification
- Kingdom: Plantae
- Clade: Embryophytes
- Clade: Tracheophytes
- Clade: Angiosperms
- Clade: Eudicots
- Clade: Rosids
- Order: Fabales
- Family: Fabaceae
- Subfamily: Faboideae
- Tribe: Hedysareae
- Genus: Onobrychis; Mill. (1754)

Species
- Some 206, see text.

Synonyms
- Dendrobrychis Galushko (1976); Echinolobium Desv. (1813); Eriocarpaea Bertol. (1843); Xanthobrychis Galushko (1979)

= Onobrychis =

Genus of flowering plants in the bean family

Onobrychis, the sainfoins, are a genus of Eurasian perennial herbaceous plants of the legume family (Fabaceae). About 206 species are presently accepted. The Flora Europaea lists 23 species of Onobrychis; the main centre of diversity extends from Central Asia to Iran, with 56 species – 27 of which are endemic – in the latter country alone. O. viciifolia is naturalized throughout many countries in Europe and North America grasslands on calcareous soils.

== Description ==
The leaves are pinnate, alternate, with 6 to 14 pairs of oblong to linear leaflets. Sainfoins have pale pink flowers, typically blooming between June and September and pollinated by honey bees and solitary bees. The rounded single-seeded pods bear prominent spikes or similar protrusions in many species, enabling them to cling to the fur of large mammals and be thus distributed.

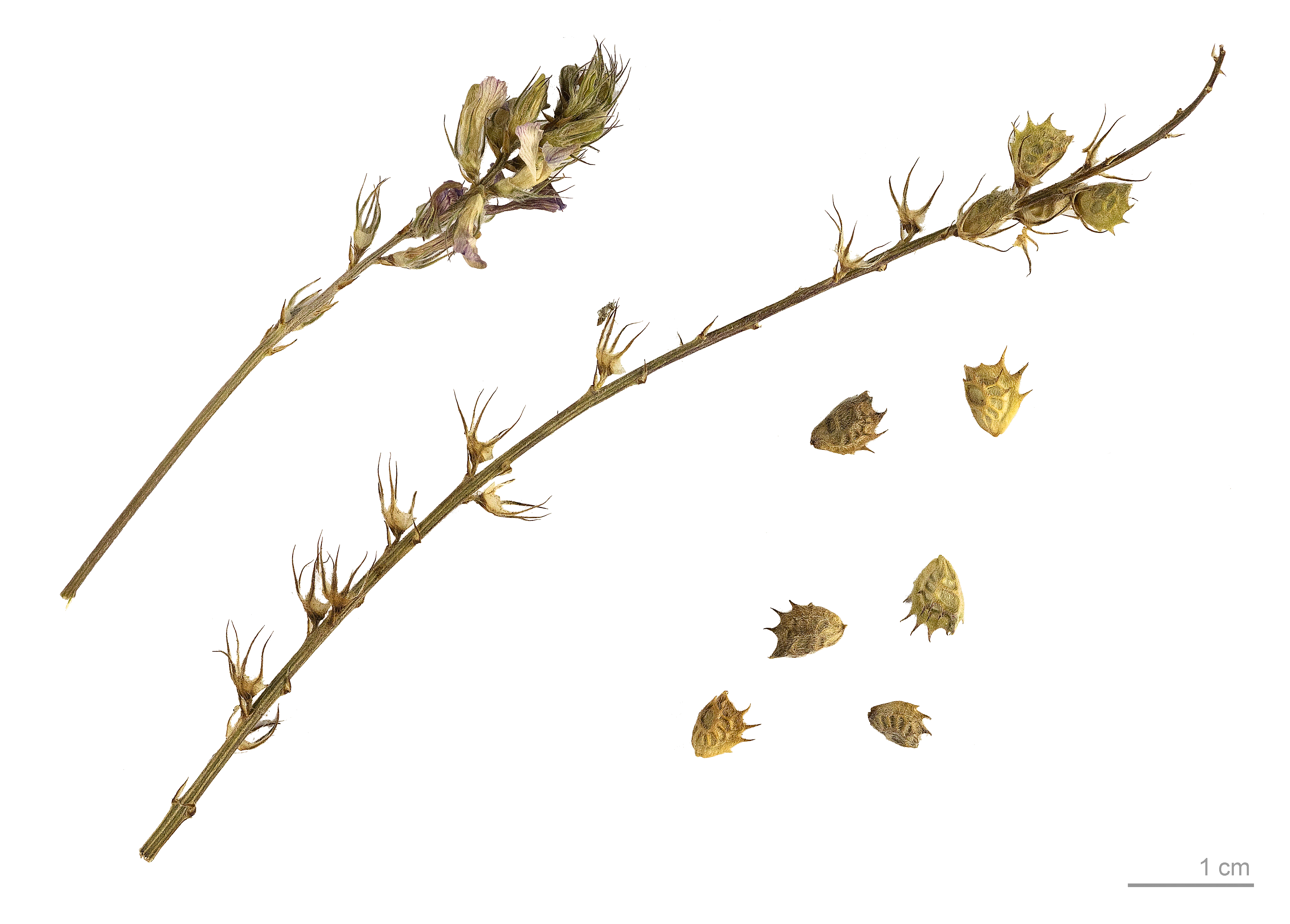
Onobrychis argentea - MHNT

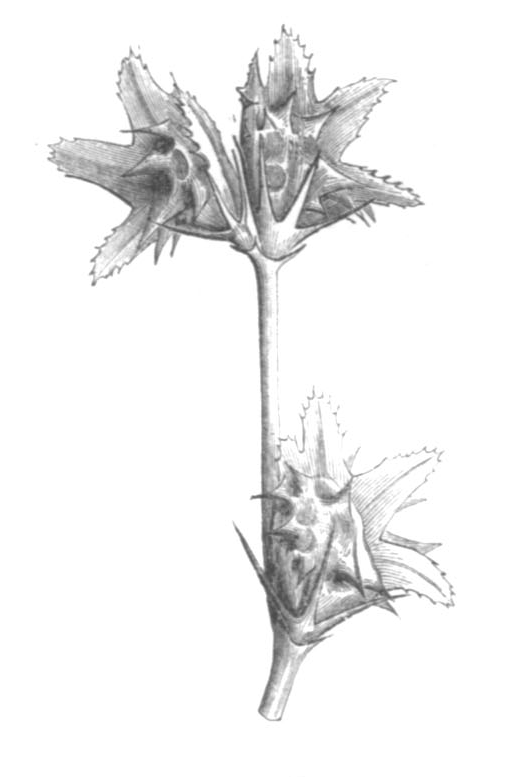
Drawing of fruiting O. caput-galli

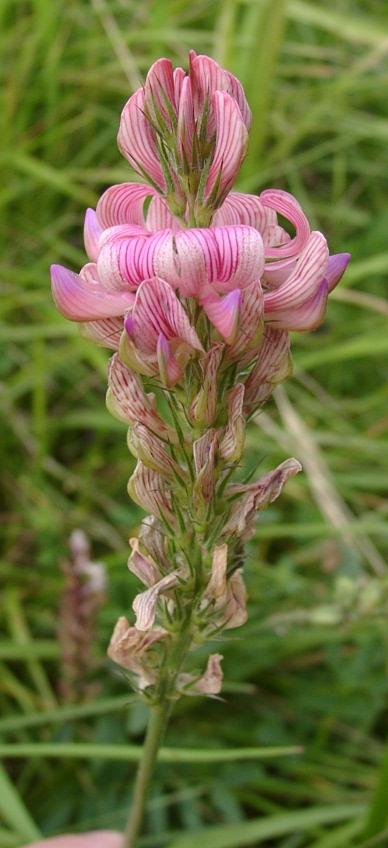
O. viciifolia flowers

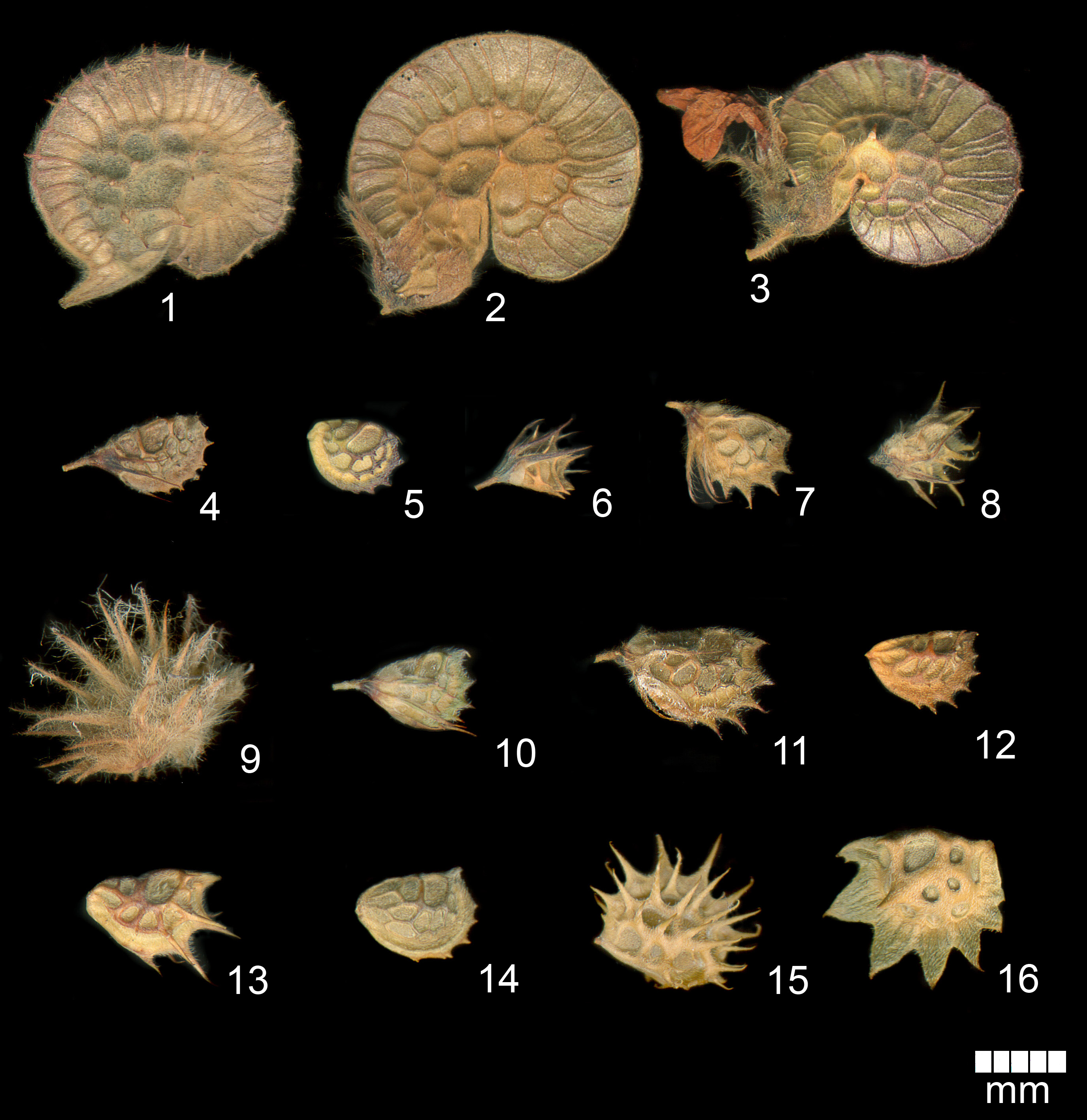
Seedpods of: 1) O. hypargyrea, 2) O. pallasii, 3) O. radiata, 4) O. petraea, 5) O. supina, 6) O. gracilis, 7) O. stenorhiza, 8) O. alba ssp. calcarea, 9) O. humilis ssp. humilis, 10) O. conferta ssp. hispanica, 11) O. montana, 12) O. arenaria ssp. tommasinii, 13) O. oxyodonta, 14) O. inermis, 15) (O. caput-galli), and 16) O. aequidentata

== Taxonomy ==
=== List of species ===
The following species are considered at least provisionally valid by the International Legume Database & Information Service; some notable subspecies are also listed:

- Onobrychis acaulis Bornm.
- Onobrychis aequidentata (Sm.) d'Urv.
- Onobrychis afghanica Sirj. & Rech.f.
- Onobrychis alatavica Bajtenov
- Onobrychis alba (Waldst. & Kit.) Desv.
  - Onobrychis alba ssp. calcarea (Vandas) P.W.Ball
- Onobrychis aliacmonia Rech.f.
- Onobrychis altissima Grossh.
- Onobrychis alyassinicus Parsa
- Onobrychis amoena Popov & Vved.
- Onobrychis andalanica Bornm.
- Onobrychis angustifolia Chinth. (= O. petrae sensu auct. fl. Cauc.)
- Onobrychis arenaria (Kit.) DC.
  - Onobrychis arenaria ssp. arenaria (= O. tanaitica Spreng., O. viciifolia sensu auct. fl. Ross.)
  - Onobrychis arenaria ssp. sibirica (Besser) P.W.Ball (= O. tanaitica sensu auct. non Spreng.)
  - Onobrychis arenaria ssp. tommasinii (Jord.) Asch. & Graebn.
- Onobrychis argyrea Boiss. (= O. ornata)
- Onobrychis arnacantha Boiss.
- Onobrychis atropatana Boiss. (=? O. heterophylla sensu Trautv.)
- Onobrychis aucheri Boiss.
- Onobrychis baldshuanica Sirj.
- Onobrychis bertiscea Sirj. & Rech.f.
- Onobrychis bicornis Vassilcz. (validity requires confirmation)
- Onobrychis biebersteinii Sirj. (= O. sativa sensu Ledeb.)
- Onobrychis bobrovii Grossh.
- Onobrychis buhseana Boiss.
- Onobrychis "buhseana" Bunge (validity requires confirmation)
- Onobrychis bungei Boiss.
- Onobrychis cadevallii Jahand. et al.
- Onobrychis caput-galli (L.) Lam. Cock's Head
- Onobrychis chorassanica Boiss. (= O. circinnata sensu auct. fl. As. Med. non Ledeb., O. radiata sensu auct. fl. As. Med., O. vaginalis sensu auct. fl. As. Med.)
- Onobrychis conferta (Desf.) Desv.
  - Onobrychis conferta ssp. hispanica (Sirj.) Guitt. & Kerguelen
- Onobrychis cornuta (L.) Desv.
- Onobrychis crista-galli (L.) Lam.
- Onobrychis cyri Grossh. (=? O. viciaefolia sensu Trautv.)
- Onobrychis daghestanica Grossh.
- Onobrychis darwasicaa Vassilcz.
- Onobrychis dealbata Stocks
- Onobrychis degenii Dorfl.
- Onobrychis depauperata Boiss.
- Onobrychis dielsii (Sirj.) Vassilcz.
- Onobrychis ebenoides Boiss. & Spruner
- Onobrychis echidna Lipsky
- Onobrychis elymaitiaca Boiss. & Hausskn.
- Onobrychis eubrychidea Boiss.
- Onobrychis fallax Freyn & Sint.
- Onobrychis ferganica (Sirj.) Grossh.
- Onobrychis freitagii Rech.f.
- Onobrychis galegifolia Boiss.
- Onobrychis garinensis
- Onobrychis gaubae Bornm.
- Onobrychis gontscharovii Vassilcz. (= O. lipskyi sensu auct. non Korovin)
- Onobrychis gracilis Besser (= O. longeaculeata (Pacz.) Wissjul., O. petrae sensu Besser)
- Onobrychis grandis Lipsky
- Onobrychis grossheimii B.Fedtsch.
- Onobrychis gypsicola Rech.f.
- Onobrychis hajastana Grossh.
- Onobrychis hamata Vassilcz.
- Onobrychis haussknechtii Boiss.
- Onobrychis heliocarpa Boiss.
- Onobrychis heterophylla C.A.Mey.
- Onobrychis hohenackerana C.A.Mey.
- Onobrychis humilis (Loefl.) G.López
  - Onobrychis humilis ssp. humilis
  - Onobrychis humilis ssp. matritensis (Boiss. & Reut.) Greuter & Burdet (= O. longeaculeata (Boiss.) Pau)
- Onobrychis hypargyrea Boiss.
- Onobrychis iberica Grossh.
- Onobrychis inermis Steven
- Onobrychis iranica Bornm.
- Onobrychis iranshahrii Rech.f.
- Onobrychis jailae Czernova
- Onobrychis kabylica (Bornm.) Sirj.
- Onobrychis kachetica Boiss. & Buhse
- Onobrychis kemulariae Chinth. (= O. biebersteinii sensu auct. fl. Cauc.)
- Onobrychis kermanensis (Sirj. & Rech.f.) Rech.f.
- Onobrychis kluchorica Chinth.
- Onobrychis komarovii Grossh.
- Onobrychis kotschyana Fenzl
- Onobrychis lahidjanicus Parsa
- Onobrychis laxiflora Baker (=? O. schugnanica)
- Onobrychis longipes Bunge
- Onobrychis lunata Boiss.
- Onobrychis luristanica Rech.f.
- Onobrychis macrorrhiza Rech.f.
- Onobrychis major (Boiss.) Hand.-Mazz.
- Onobrychis majorovii Grossh.
- Onobrychis mazanderanica Rech.f.
- Onobrychis megalobotrys Aitch. & Hemsl. (= O. vaginalis sensu auct. non C.A.Mey. non fl. As. Med.)
- Onobrychis megaloptera Kovalevsk. (=? O. chorassanica sensu Nikitina)
- Onobrychis megataphros Boiss.
- Onobrychis melanotricha Boiss. (=? O. belangeri, =? O. linearis)
- Onobrychis mermuelleri Podlech & Rech.f.
- Onobrychis meschetica Grossh.
- Onobrychis michauxii DC.
- Onobrychis micrantha Schrenk
- Onobrychis microptera Baker
- Onobrychis montana DC.
- Onobrychis nemecii Sirj.
- Onobrychis nikitinii Orazm.
- Onobrychis novopokrovskii Vassilcz.
- Onobrychis nummularia Boiss.
- Onobrychis oxyodonta Boiss.
- Onobrychis oxyptera Boiss.
- Onobrychis oxytropoides Bunge
- Onobrychis pallasii (Willd.) M. Bieb.
- Onobrychis pallida Boiss. & Kotschy
- Onobrychis paucidentata Pomel (validity requires confirmation)
- Onobrychis persica Sirj. & Rech.f.
- Onobrychis petraea (Willd.) Fisch.
- Onobrychis pindicola Hausskn.
- Onobrychis plantago Bornm.
- Onobrychis poikilantha Rech.f.
- Onobrychis psoraleifolia Boiss.
- Onobrychis ptolemaica (Delile) DC.
- Onobrychis ptychophylla Sirj. & Rech.f.
- Onobrychis pulchella Schrenk
- Onobrychis pyrenaica (Sennen) Sirj.
- Onobrychis radiata (Desf.) M.Bieb. (= O. circinata Ledeb.
- Onobrychis rechingerorum Wendelbo
- Onobrychis reuteri Leresche
- Onobrychis ruprechtii Grossh.
- Onobrychis samanganica Rech.f.
- Onobrychis saravschanica B.Fedtsch. (= O. amoena sensu auct. non Popov & Vved., O. baldshuanica sensu auct. non Sirj., O. baldzuanica Sirj., O. circinata sensu auct. non Ledeb. non fl. As. Med.)
- Onobrychis sauzakensis Sirj. & Rech.f.
- Onobrychis saxatilis (L.) Lam.
- Onobrychis schahuensis Bornm.
- Onobrychis schuschajensis O.D.Agajeva
- Onobrychis scrobiculata Boiss.
- Onobrychis sennenii Sirj.
- Onobrychis shahpurensis Rech.f.
- Onobrychis sintenisii Bornm.
- Onobrychis sirdjanicus Parsa
- Onobrychis sojakii Rech.f.
- Onobrychis sphaciotica Greuter
- Onobrychis spinosissima Baker
- Onobrychis splendida Rech.f. & Podlech
- Onobrychis stenorhiza DC.
- Onobrychis stewartii Baker
- Onobrychis subacaulis Boiss.
- Onobrychis subnitens Bornm.
- Onobrychis supina (Vill.) DC.
- Onobrychis susiana Nabelek
- Onobrychis szovitsii Boiss.
- Onobrychis talagonica Rech.f.
- Onobrychis tavernieraefolia Boiss.
- Onobrychis tesquicola Krytzka
- Onobrychis tournefortii (Willd.) Desv.
- Onobrychis transcaspica V.V.Nikitin
- Onobrychis transcaucasica Grossh.
- Onobrychis transsilvanica
- Onobrychis vaginalis C.A.Mey.
- Onobrychis vassilczenkoi Grossh.
- Onobrychis verae Sirj. (= O. lipskyi Korovin)
- Onobrychis venosa (Desf).Desv.
- Onobrychis viciifolia Scop. (= O. sativa Lam.)
- Onobrychis wettsteinii Nabelek

=== Etymology ===
Onobrychis means "devoured by donkeys", from Ancient Greek ónos (ὄνος, "donkey") and brýkein (βρύκειν, "to eat greedily"). This refers to sainfoin's good properties as a forage plant for large mammalian herbivores.

Sainfoin is derived from Old French sain foin ("healthy hay"). In the words of the 16th-century soil scientist Olivier de Serres:

The herb is called sain-foin in France, in Italy herba medica, in Provence and the Languedoc luzerne. From the inordinate praise the plant has been given, for its medical virtues and for fattening the livestock that graze on it, comes the term sain.

In northern European languages that have been less influenced by French, the plants' name usually derives from esparceto, the Provençal term for the similar-looking and closely related sweetvetches (Hedysarum). Examples are Danish esparsette, Dutch esparcette, German Esparsette, Lithuanian esparceta, Polish sparceta, Russian 'espartset (Эспарцет) and Swedish esparsett. Meanwhile, the Occitan name of sainfoin, luzerne, has in many languages come to mean species of the related genus Medicago, in particular Alfalfa (M. sativa).

The native name of the cock's head (O. caput-galli) is one of the few words of the extinct Dacian language that have been recorded. The Dacians called this plant aniarsexe or aniassexie.

== Distribution and habitat ==
Sainfoins are mostly subtropical plants, but their range extends throughout Europe as far north as southern Sweden. These plants grow on grassland, agricultural land and wasteland.

== Ecology ==
Onobrychis species are used as food plants by the caterpillars of some Lepidoptera species, such as the case-bearer moth Coleophora colutella (recorded on O. saxatilis) and the Damon Blue (Polyommatus damon) butterfly.

== Uses ==
These highly nutritious plants were an important forage for heavy working horses in agriculture, and are still an excellent source of nectar for honey production as well as pollen for bee food. Because sainfoins are rich in tannins which protect proteins from hydrolysis in the rumen, the proteins are instead absorbed in the abomasum. Onobrychis typically have a deep taproot and so are very drought resistant, but do not recover well from overgrazing. Adapted to slow but steady growth in the arid steppe belt of Eurasia, sainfoins are difficult to establish as pasture, are not persistent in grassland, and only yield one crop of hay or seeds per year. Thus they are seldom grown in any significant extent, though O. viciifolia is met with somewhat more regularly.

=== Nutrition ===
Sainfoin provides a superb forage for grazing animals and voluntary intake of sainfoin by cattle and sheep is 20% higher than for grass. Unlike many other legumes, it is non-bloating and is known to have anthelmintic properties, so reducing the problems associated with livestock worms. Sainfoin contains condensed tannins, and it is these that protect animals against bloat. Sainfoin has also been shown to increase protein absorption. This, combined with its other health benefits, mean that animals grazing sainfoin have very rapid liveweight gains, so young stock can be finished sooner and with very good carcass grades. Sainfoin is therefore extremely useful to low input and organic farmers. Yields can be very high at around 16t DM per hectare.

Methods and research techniques have been studied and developed to look specifically at Sainfoin polyphenols which include tannins and flavonoids. There are significant differences between Sainfoin types and this will lead to further development of Sainfoin plant breeding.

One method for improving nitrogen utilisation by ruminants and reduce greenhouse gases (CH_{4}, N_{2}O), without altering their nitrogen and energy value, is to use forages that contain condensed tannins, such as sainfoin. The nutritive value of sainfoin, despite its lower nitrogen content than lucerne, is high. Future research, on the nutritional impact of condensed tannins is likely not only be based on condensed tannin content, but also include structure-activity considerations. The results obtained, with sheep at maintenance fed a diet containing only sainfoin will be tested with producing animals, for example growing sheep and cattle, lactating ewes, goats or cows. In producing animals the diet will comprise different forage sources and supplement feeds.

Sainfoin is seldom used as a pure crop and is generally introduced in pasture in a grass-legume mix with cocksfoot (Dactylis), ryegrass (Lolium) or with other legumes such as red clover, white clover or lucerne. Results have shown the choice of the variety is important. A variety like Esparcette, characterised by the highest condensed tannin content, may provide beneficial effects with a lower proportion in a mixture with other legumes. Preserving legumes, as silage, is a good way to provide an on-farm source of home-grown energy and protein, offers advantages over traditional haymaking, being less weather-dependent, and allows a high quality of forage during the harvesting period. In particular, wrapped silage bales of sainfoin have great potential in animal nutrition and can be used by farmers, as found that condensed tannin effects were not reduced by this mode of preservation.

== In culture ==
In George Orwell's Coming Up for Air, travelling salesman George Bowling regularly reminisces about the smell of sainfoin in his father's seed shop in Lower Binfield.
